= Federal Woman's Award =

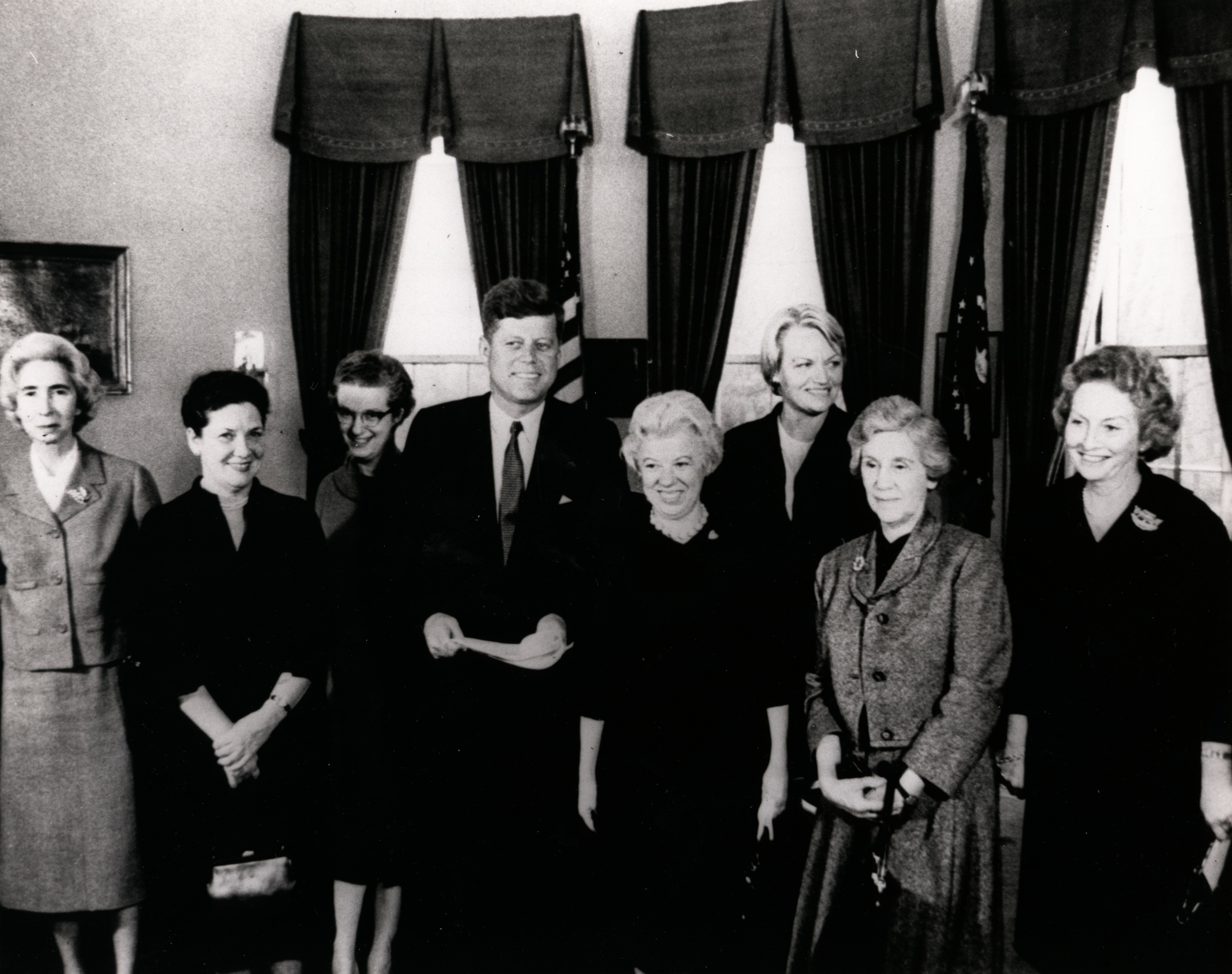
President John F. Kennedy meets with recipients of the 1962 Federal Woman's Award for outstanding contributions to government on February 27, 1962. Shown from left to right are Dr. Allene R. Jeanes, Research Chemist at the Department of Agriculture; Evelyn Harrison, deputy director of the Bureau of Programs and Standard at the Civil Service Commission; Dr. Nancy Grace Roman, Chief of Astronomy and Solar Physics at the National Aeronautics and Space Administration (NASA); President Kennedy; Margaret H. Brass, Attorney at the Department of Justice; Katherine W. Bracken, Director of the Office of Central American and Panamanian Affairs at the Department of State; Dr. Thelma B. Dunn, cancer researcher at the National Cancer Institute; Katie Louchheim, Deputy Assistant Secretary of State for Public Affairs (accompanying the recipients). Photo taken in the Oval Office of the White House in Washington, D.C.

The Federal Woman's Award, also known as the Federal Women's Award, was given by the United States Civil Service Commission from 1961 until 1976.

The Federal Woman's Award was established by Barbara Bates Gunderson in 1960, while she was serving on the Civil Service Commission. Her goal was to publicize the ways women were excelling in federal employment, and to encourage young women to consider careers with federal laboratories and agencies. Gunderson was also the first chair of the award's board. Katie Louchheim, Deputy Assistant Secretary of State for Public Affairs, and later Patricia Hitt, Assistant Secretary of Health, Education, and Welfare, issued press releases about the awards and appeared at the presentation events.

Nominations were submitted annually by federal departments and agencies to the board of trustees for the Federal Woman's Award. The nominations were judged by a panel of "persons prominent in public life", including magazine editors, broadcasters, journalists, business executives, and college presidents. Among the judges were Milton S. Eisenhower, Carl Rowan, Doris Fleeson, Arthur Sherwood Flemming, Sol Linowitz, David Brinkley, Betty Furness, and Katharine E. McBride.

About six recipients were selected each year, for their "outstanding achievement and ability in an executive, professional, scientific, or technical position in the federal service." Award winners were invited to a ceremony in the Oval Office. The president posed for official photographs with the group, and made remarks for the occasion.

The awards were discontinued after the 1976 presentations, though there were nominations for 1977. "Although the prize had served its purpose at no cost to the government, its continuation in the era of equal opportunity as a separate compensatory award for women only, which had seemed so harmless and even chivalric before, began to raise concerns and embarrassment," noted historian of science Margaret Rossiter. In 1978, Rosalyn Yalow, one of the award's first recipients, recalled that "I viewed this award as second-class", adding "I was therefore delighted to learn last year that the Federal Woman's Award was to be discontinued — I hope permanently."

== Awardees by year ==
=== 1961 ===
- Beatrice Aitchison
- Ruth E. Bacon
- Nina Kinsella (Warden of the Federal Reformatory for Women, Alderson, WV)
- Charlotte Moore Sitterly
- Aryness Joy Wickens
- Rosalyn Sussman Yalow

=== 1962 ===
- Katherine W. Bracken (Director of the Office of Central American and Panamanian Affairs, Department of State)
- Margaret H. Brass (attorney, Department of Justice)
- Thelma Brumfield Dunn
- Evelyn Harrison (Civil Service Commission)
- Allene Jeanes
- Nancy Roman

=== 1963 ===
- Eleanor L. Makel
- Bessie Margolin
- Katharine Kniskern Mather
- Verna C. Mohagen (1908-1980; Personnel Management Division, Department of Agriculture)
- Blanche W. Noyes
- Eleanor C. Pressly

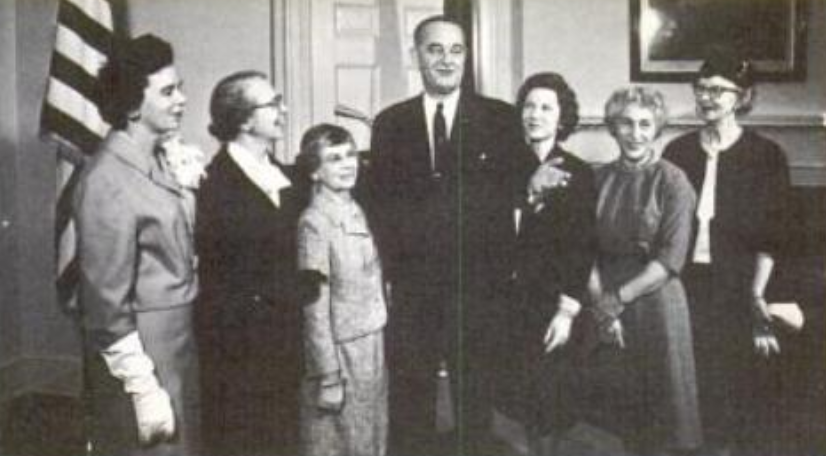
President Lyndon B. Johnson poses in the Oval Office with six winners of the 1964 Federal Woman's Award; from left to right: Elizabeth Messer, Evelyn M. Anderson, Gertrude Blanch, President Johnson, Patricia van Delden, Margaret Schwartz, and Selene Gifford

=== 1964 ===
- Evelyn Anderson
- Gertrude Blanch
- Selene Gifford
- Elizabeth F. Messer (Civil Service Commission)
- Margaret Wolman Schwartz (specialist in economic warfare, Treasury Department)
- Patricia G. van Delden

=== 1965 ===
Sources:

- Ann Z. Caracristi
- Elizabeth B. Drewry
- Dorothy M. Gilford
- Carol Laise
- Sarah Elizabeth Stewart
- Penelope Hartland-Thunberg

=== 1966 ===
- Fannie N. Boyls (1906-2002; National Labor Relations Board)
- Stella E. Davis (Desk officer, East and South Africa, USIA)
- Jocelyn Gill
- Ida Craven Merriam
- Irene Parsons (Personnel, Veterans Administration)
- Ruth G. Van Cleve (director, Office of the Territories, Department of Interior)

Also nominated: Julia Brown Wright (US Naval Propellant Plant)

=== 1967 ===
- Elizabeth Ann Brown
- Barbara Moulton
- Anne Mason Roberts
- Kathryn Grove Shipp
- Wilma Victor
- Marjorie J. Williams

=== 1968 ===
Sources:

- Ruth R. Benerito
- Mabel Kunce Gibby (1926-2015; vocational rehab, psychologist)
- Frances M. James (Council of Economic Advisors)
- Ruby Grant Martin
- Lucille Farrier Stickel
- Rogene L. Thompson (Federal Aviation Administration)
- Nina Bencich Woodside

Also nominated: Eileen R. Donovan, Charlotte M. Hubbard, and Susan T. Tait

=== 1969 ===
- Mary Hughes Budenbach
- Edith N. Cook (Associate Solicitor, Division of Legislation, Department of Labor)
- Eileen R. Donovan
- Jo Ann Smith Kinney (Navy, Submarine Medical Research Lab)
- Esther Christian Lawton
- Dorothy L. Starbuck

=== 1970 ===
- Jean Apgar
- Margaret Pittman
- Naomi Rosen Sweeney (Office of Management and Budget)
- Sarah B. Glindmeyer (chief of the Bureau of Nursing, D. C. Dept. of Public Health)
- Valerija B. Raulinaitis
- Margaret Joy Tibbetts

Also nominated: Marilyn Levy

=== 1971 ===
- Jeanne Wilson Davis (National Security Council)
- Florence Johnson Hicks (Public Health, Washington DC)
- Juanita Morris Moody
- Essie Davis Morgan
- Rita Rapp
- Joan R. Rosenblatt

Also nominated: Frances L. Whedon, Miriam H. Thomas, Joyce L. House, Joyce I. Allen, Vilma B. Harper, Cleo S. Cason

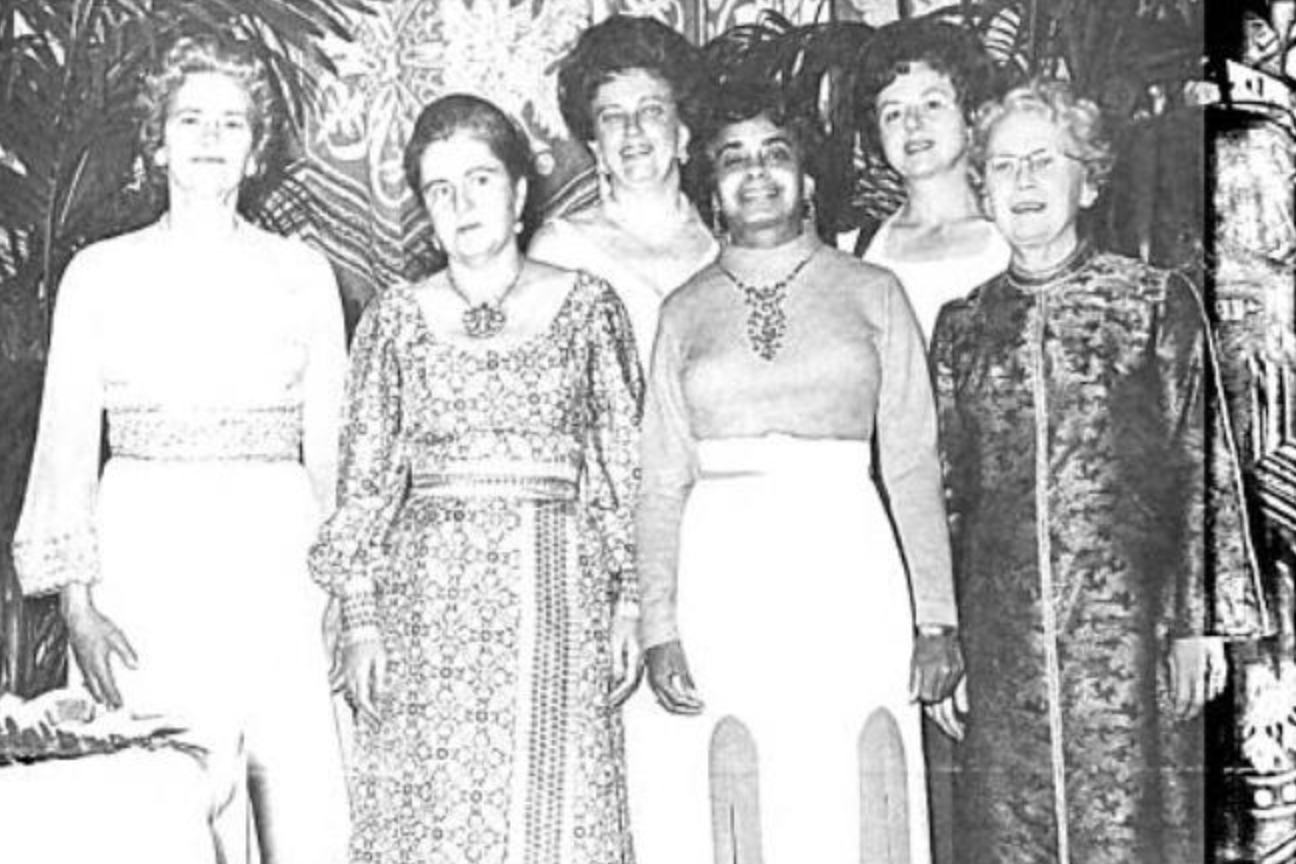
Federal Woman's Award winners in 1972: Mary H. Ferguson, Patricia Ann McCreedy, Ruth M. Davis, Phyllis Dixon Clemmons, Lois Albro Chatham, and Ruth M. Leverton

=== 1972 ===
- Lois Albro Chatham
- Phyllis Dixon Clemmons
- Ruth M. Davis
- Mary Harrover Ferguson (d. 1999; Office of Naval Research)
- Ruth M. Leverton
- Patricia Ann McCreedy

=== 1973 ===
- Bernice L. Bernstein (HEW)
- Marguerite S. Chang
- Janet Hart (Federal Reserve)
- Marilyn E. Jacox
- Isabel L. Karle
- Marjorie R. Townsend

=== 1974 ===
- Henriette D. Avram
- Edna A. Boorady
- Roselyn Payne Epps
- Brigid Gray Leventhal
- Gladys P. Rogers (Department of State)
- Madge Skelly

=== 1975 ===
- Beatrice Dvorak (Department of Labor)
- Evans Hayward
- Wilda Martinez (Department of Agriculture)
- Marie U. Nylen

Also nominated: Theresa V. Brassard

=== 1976 ===
- I. Blanche Bourne (Public Health, Government of the District of Columbia)
- Carin Ann Clauss
- Dorothy I. Fennell (Department of Agriculture)
- Marion J. Finkel (FDA)
- Mary Patricia Murray (VA, kinesiologist)
- Joyce J. Walker (OMB)

=== 1977 ===
Nominated: Lola McFerson
