= Selene Gifford =

American government official

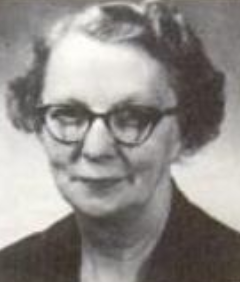
- Selene Gifford, from a 1964 publication of the United States federal government
- Born: May 30, 1901; Rochester, Massachusetts
- Died: July 21, 1979 (aged 78); Leesburg, Virginia
- Occupation(s): Social worker, federal official, international relief worker
- Known for: Federal Woman's Award (1964)

Selene Gifford (May 30, 1901 – July 21, 1979) was an American social worker, and an international and federal government official. She won the Federal Woman's Award in 1964, for her work and leadership at the Bureau of Indian Affairs.

== Early life ==
Selene Gifford was born in Rochester, Massachusetts, the daughter of George G. Gifford and Elizabeth Anna Sherman Gifford.

== Career ==
During the Great Depression, Gifford was a social worker in various states. In 1936, she was assistant regional social worker with the Works Progress Administration (WPA) in West Virginia. In 1938 she was a speaker at a Florida state conference on social work. By 1940 she was chief regional supervisor of the WPA in the deep South, and spoke to the Mississippi Conference of Social Workers.

In 1943 Gifford was a public welfare consultant at the War Relocation Authority, tasked with visiting Japanese internment camps. She argued for the employment of White conscientious objectors at the camps, and spoke about the camps on a panel with Mike Masaoka and Annie Clo Watson at a social work convention.

After World War II, she was based overseas: she served as deputy chief of mission at the United States Embassy in Cairo, was Director of Displaced Persons at the United Nations Relief and Rehabilitation Administration (UNRRA) in London, and worked in Geneva with the International Refugee Organization on relief, resettlement and rehabilitation programs.

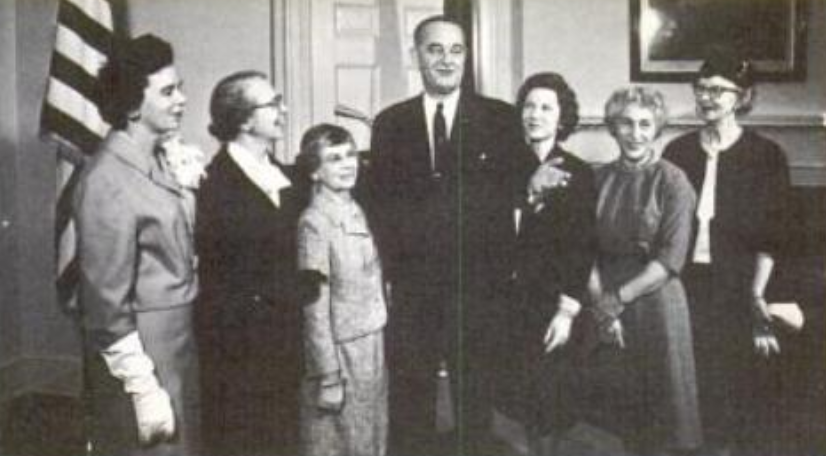
President Lyndon B. Johnson poses in the Oval Office with six winners of the 1964 Federal Woman's Award; from left to right: Elizabeth Messer, Evelyn M. Anderson, Gertrude Blanch, President Johnson, Patricia van Delden, Margaret Schwartz, and Selene Gifford

Gifford, who was white, spent most of her career at the Bureau of Indian Affairs. She became head of the bureau's Division of Community Services in 1949, and assistant commissioner of the bureau in 1952. In 1958, she testified before a House committee on funding for the education of American Indian children. In 1961, she testified before a Senate committee on the constitutional rights of the American Indian. She also established job placement programs, studied issues of law enforcement funding, and supported the repeal of discriminatory laws regarding the sale of alcohol to Native Americans, saying "I do not deny that drinking is a problem among the Indians. But isn't it with any group of people?" In 1962, Gifford received the bureau's Citation for Distinguished Service. In 1964, she received the Federal Woman's Award. She retired from the bureau in 1965.

== Personal life ==
Selene Gifford died from colon cancer in Leesburg, Virginia in 1979, aged 78 years. Her grave is with those of her siblings, in Rochester, Massachusetts.
