= Madge Skelly =

American actress and audiologist (1903–1993)

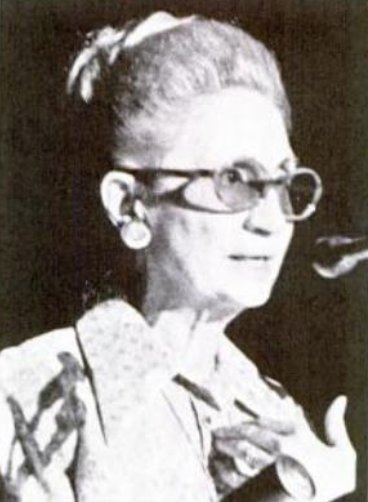
- Madge Skelly, from a 1974 publication of the United States federal government
- Born: Madeline Esther Skelly; May 9, 1903; Pittsburgh, Pennsylvania
- Died: May 27, 1993 (aged 90); St. Louis, Missouri
- Other names: Madeline Foust, Madge Skelly-Hakanson
- Occupations: Actress, playwright, director, audiologist, speech pathologist

Madeline Esther "Madge" Skelly (May 9, 1903 – May 27, 1993), later Madge Skelly-Hakanson, was an American actress, playwright, director, college professor, speech pathologist and audiologist.

== Early life ==
Madeline Esther Skelly was born in Hazelwood, a neighborhood of Pittsburgh, Pennsylvania, the daughter of Charles J. Skelly and Julia Purcell Skelly. Her parents were Iroquois-Onondaga performers. She graduated from Seton Hill College in 1924. She earned a master's degree at Duquesne University in 1928, and a second master's degree at the University of Arizona. She completed doctoral studies in speech pathology at Saint Louis University in 1962, in her late fifties.

== Career ==
=== Theatre and radio ===
Skelly began her career in theatre from an early age, and continued through college and afterwards, as an actress, director, and playwright. She worked at KDKA Radio in Pittsburgh, as a sound technician, writer, and on-air talent. She appeared on Broadway in several shows. She was director of the Tucson Little Theatre in Arizona, the Brattle Theatre in Massachusetts, the Kalamazoo Civic Theatre in Michigan, and, from 1952 to 1961, managing director of the Manistee Summer Theatre. She wrote at least twenty plays. The Manistee Civic Theatre has a Madge Skelly Tower, named for Skelly in 1974. One of the young actors she mentored at Manistee was James Earl Jones.

Skelly was dean of drama and dean of women at Duquesne University. She taught speech at the University of Arizona, and speech and drama at Maryville College.

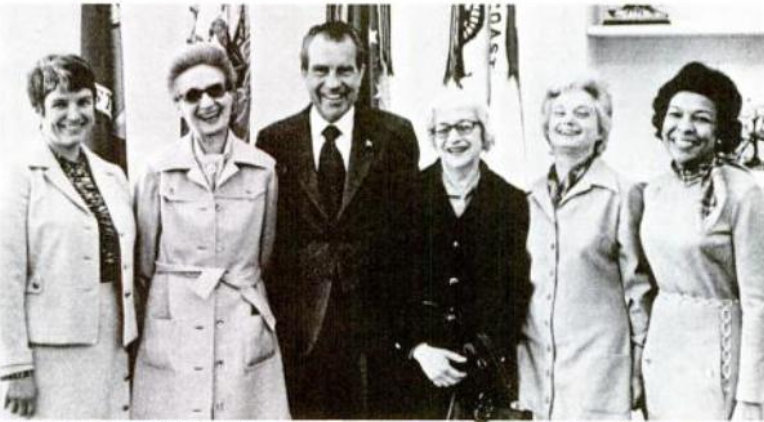
Richard Nixon posed standing and smiling in the Oval Office with five recipients of the 1974 Federal Woman's Award; from left, Brigid Leventhal, Madge Skelly, Nixon, Henriette Avram, Gladys Rogers, and Roselyn P. Epps

=== Speech pathology ===
After earning degrees in speech pathology, she worked in veterans' hospitals and children's hospitals, with patients who needed speech rehabilitation following an injury or illness. She incorporated gestural expression systems from Iroquois tradition into her work, and made a video, Compensatory techniques for the glossectomee (1977), about her techniques.

Skelly was chief of audiology and speech pathology services at John J. Cochran Hospital in St. Louis, and taught at the Saint Louis University School of Medicine. She also taught at Fontbonne University in Missouri. Her research was published in academic journals, including the Journal of Speech and Hearing Disorders, American Journal of Nursing, Plastic and Reconstructive Surgery, and The American Journal of Surgery.

== Selected publications ==
- "Total glossectomy for cancer" (1968, with Robert C. Donaldson and Francis X. Paletta)
- "Compensatory Physiologic Phonetics for the Glossectomee" (1971, with Diane J. Spector, Robert C. Donaldson, Armand Brodeur, and Francis X. Paletta)
- "Dysphonias Associated with Spinal Bracing in Scoliosis" (1971, with Robert C. Donaldson, George E. Scheer, and Margaret R. Guzzardo)
- "Changes in Phonatory Aspects of Glossectomee Intelligibility through Vocal Parameter Manipulation" (1972, with Robert C. Donaldson, Rita Solovitz Fust, and Diana L. Towsend)
- "Visor Flap Reconstruction for a Massive Oropharyngeal Defect" (1973, with John M. Griffin, Robert C. Donaldson, and Francis X. Paletta)
- "American Indian sign (Amerind) as a facilitator of verbalization for the oral verbal apraxic" (1974, with Lorraine Schinsky, Randall W. Smith, and Rita Solovitz Fust)
- "Rethinking stroke: Aphasic patients talk back" (1975)

== Personal life ==
Skelly married twice. She married her first husband, actor Ray King Foust, in 1928; he died in World War II. Her second husband was Richard Hakanson, a fellow theatre professional. She experienced arthritis, diabetes, and vision impairment later in life. She died in 1993, aged 90 years, in St. Louis.

== Awards and recognition ==
In 1974, Skelly received the Federal Woman's Award. She was awarded the Saint Elizabeth Ann Seton Medal from her alma mater, Seton Hill University. She gave an oral history interview to the Schlesinger Library in 1981. She was posthumously inducted into the Association of Veterans Affairs Speech-Language Pathologists (AVASLP) Hall of Fame in 2002.
