= List of people from Annandale, Virginia =

The following is a list of notable individuals who were born in and/or have lived in Annandale, Virginia.

== Arts and entertainment ==
- Pierce Askegren, author
- Myriam Avalos, classical pianist
- Tony Cavalero, actor and comedian
- Mark Hamill, actor
- Rob Huebel, actor and comedian
- Cat Janice, singer-songwriter
- Christopher Johnson McCandless, itinerant and subject of author Jon Krakauer's 1996 book, Into the Wild
- Pat McGee, singer-songwriter
- Robert Stanton, actor
- Kelly Willis, country singer-songwriter

== Business ==
- Anthony Myint, author and restaurateur

== Politics and government ==
- Jeffrey Bell, author and political consultant
- Fawn Hall, notable figure in the Iran-Contra affair
- Susan Hutchison, chair of the Washington State Republican Party, former television news anchor
- August Larson, USMC major general
- Joe Morrissey, Virginia state senator, former member of the Virginia House of Delegates; former Virginia Commonwealth Attorney
- Robert Sarvis, Libertarian candidate for governor in the 2013 election
- Cao Van Vien, former chairman of the South Vietnamese Joint General Staff
- James Walkinshaw, U.S. representative
- Vivian E. Watts, member of the Virginia House of Delegates
- Kevin Whitaker, U.S. Ambassador to Colombia

== Science ==
- Frank Cepollina, engineer and inventor
- Frances L. Whedon, meteorologist

== Sports ==
- Ray Crittenden, football player
- Chuck Drazenovich, football player
- Mark Duffner, football coach
- Bill Hamid, professional soccer player for D.C. United
- Arthur Jackson, Olympic medalist sport shooter
- Michael Lahoud, professional soccer player for Chivas USA
- Carl Strong, soccer player
- Don Whitmire, football player
