= Jeanes =

Jeanes is a surname, and may refer to:

- Allene Jeanes (1906–1995), American chemical researcher
- Anna T. Jeanes (1822–1907), American philanthropist
- David Jeanes (born 1943), English former rugby player
- Susan Jeanes (born 1958), Australian politician
- Tex Jeanes (1900–1973), American baseball player
