= Essie Davis Morgan =

American social worker

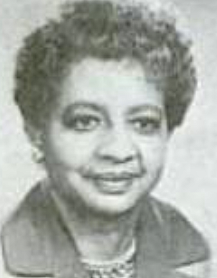
- Essie Davis Morgan, from a 1971 publication of the US federal government
- Born: Essie Mae Davis; December 31, 1919; Waycross, Georgia, US
- Died: February 27, 1990 (aged 70); Washington, D.C., US
- Education: Alabama State College Atlanta University
- Occupation: Social worker
- Relatives: Ossie Davis (brother), William Conan Davis (brother), Guy Davis (nephew)

Essie Davis Morgan (December 31, 1919 – February 27, 1990) was an American social worker. She received the Federal Woman's Award in 1971 for her work on community services for disabled veterans.

== Early life ==
Essie Mae Davis was born in Georgia, the daughter of Kince Charles Davis and Laura Jane Cooper Davis. Her father worked in railroad construction. Actor Ossie Davis and chemist William Conan Davis were two of her brothers. She graduated from Alabama State College, and earned a master's degree in social work at Atlanta University.

== Career ==
Davis worked at the Veterans Administration Hospital in Tuskegee, Alabama, where she worked on community projects involving veterans with psychiatric disabilities and veterans who required dialysis. In 1965 she joined the social work staff at the Veterans' Administration (VA) offices in Washington, D.C. She was named chief of Community Services, then chief of Rehabilitation and Staff Development in the VA's Spinal Cord Injury Service, and manager of the Washington, D.C. regional office. She was the first Black woman to head a regional office of the VA. She retired in 1986.

Morgan won the Federal Woman's Award in 1971, "for her outstanding and original work in developing the social and emotional aspects of the care and treatment of veteran patients and their families." She also received honors from the Paralyzed Veterans of America.

Morgan was recognized as a national authority on community services and rehabilitation for veterans with spinal cord injuries. She gave workshops at VA facilities across the United States, presented at professional conferences, and published her research and policy findings in academic journals, including Rehabilitation Psychology and Journal of the National Medical Association. She co-wrote a chapter for Joseph Stubbins, ed., Social and Psychological Aspects of Disability: A Handbook for Practitioners (1977).

== Personal life and legacy ==
Essie Davis married World War II veteran William Spencer Morgan in 1949. They had two children. He died in 1984. Morgan died from a brain tumor in 1990, aged 70 years, in Washington, D.C. Her gravesite is with her husband's, in Arlington National Cemetery. The Essie Morgan Excellence Award (later the Essie Morgan Lectureship) was established later that year by the Academy of Spinal Cord Injury Professionals, in her memory.
