= Edna A. Boorady =

American lawyer

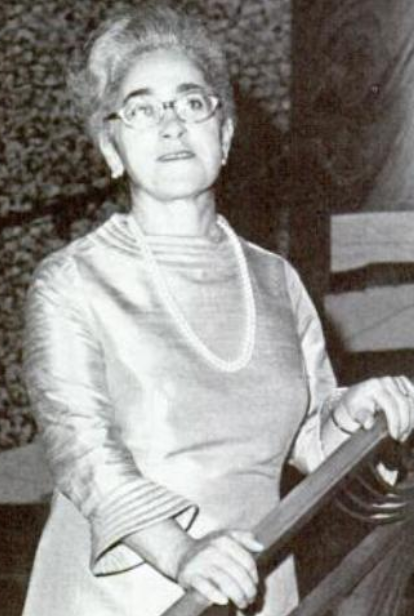
- Edna A. Boorady in 1974
- Born: March 13, 1921; Dunkirk, New York, U.S.
- Died: November 8, 2008 (aged 87); Dunkirk, New York, U.S.
- Other names: Betty Boorady
- Occupation(s): Lawyer, diplomat

Edna A. "Betty" Boorady (March 13, 1921 – November 8, 2008) was an American lawyer and diplomat. She was "a leading force in the creation of the U.S. Agency for International Development" (USAID). In her 33 years with USAID, she was stationed in Thailand, Guyana, and Lesotho. among other assignments. She received the Federal Woman's Award in 1974 for her achievements.

== Early life and education ==
Boorady was born in Dunkirk, New York, the daughter of Albert M. Boorady and Tamam Mosey Boorady. Both of her parents were born in Lebanon; her father owned a men's clothing store. She graduated from St. Mary's Academy in Dunkirk in 1938. Later in life, she graduated from Fordham University in 1951, and earned a law degree from Cornell Law School in 1954.

== Career ==
Boorady worked as a stenographer in Washington, D.C., during World War II. From 1944 to 1947, she was principal aide to the chief of mission at the UNRRA's office in Albania. She was an attorney-adviser with the International Cooperation Administration. She was director of USAID's Office of Personnel and Management. She was regional legal advisor to the USAID office in Thailand.

In 1972, Boorady became a Foreign Service Reserve officer, Class 1. In 1974, she became director of the Office of Special Assistance for Labor Relations. In 1977, she became director of USAID's office in Guyana, "the first woman to direct an overseas mission" of the USAID. From 1982 to 1986, she was mission director at USAID's office in Maseru, Lesotho.

Boorady was given the Federal Woman's Award in 1974. She retired in 1986. In retirement, she worked with one of her brothers to establish the Boorady Reading Center in their hometown. She was active in the League of Women Voters, and the New York State Bar Association.

== Personal life ==
Boorady died in 2008, at the age of 87, in Dunkirk, New York.
