= Penelope Hartland-Thunberg =

American economist (1918–2004)

- Penelope Hartland-Thunberg, from a 1965 newspaper
- Born: Claire Penelope Hartland; June 17, 1918; Massachusetts
- Died: October 16, 2004 (aged 86); Washington, D.C.
- Occupation: Economist

Penelope Hartland-Thunberg (June 17, 1918 – October 16, 2004) was an American economist and government official. She was a United States Tariff Commission member from 1965 to 1969. She received the Federal Woman's Award in 1965.

== Early life and education ==
Claire Penelope Hartland was born in Massachusetts, and raised in Cranston, Rhode Island, the daughter of William Hartland and Mariah (Marie) Louisa Hartland. She earned a bachelor's degree in economics at Pembroke College in 1940, where she was also president of the student government association, editor of the school newspaper, and captain of the varsity archery team. She completed doctoral studies in economics at Radcliffe College in 1946. Her dissertation advisor was Wassily Leontief.

== Career ==
Hartland began her career teaching undergraduates at Wells College, Mount Holyoke College, and Brown University. She moved to Washington, D.C. in 1951, to serve on the President's Council of Economic Advisers staff. She worked as a researcher and analyst at the Central Intelligence Agency from 1954 to 1966, and from 1970 to 1978. She was the first woman appointed to the United States Tariff Commission, serving from 1965 to 1969. Her appointment was announced on the same day as Thurgood Marshall was appointed Solicitor General, and she appears news photographs with Lyndon B. Johnson and Marshall, as another "first".

In 1965, Hartland-Thunberg was one of the recipients of the Federal Woman's Award, and she chaired the committee that produced a 1967 report "Federal Woman's Award Study Group on Careers for Women: Progress Report to the President". In 1979, she became Director of Economic Research at the Georgetown University Center for Economic and Strategic Studies, and the William M. School Fellow in International Business, also at Georgetown University. In 1996 she gave an interview to the Pembroke Center Oral History Project at Brown University.

== Selected works ==
Penelope Hartland-Thunberg published monographs on international economics, including the following:

- Balance of interregional payments of New England (1950)
- Western world under economic stress: The ignored opportunities (1975)
- Botswana: An African growth economy (1978)
- Namibia at the crossroads : economic and political prospects (1978, with Chester A. Crocker)
- The political and strategic importance of exports (1979)
- South Korea and the world economy in the 1980s : the problems of the zone of transition (1979)
- Trading blocs, U.S. exports, and world trade (1980)
- Has the U.S. export problem been solved? (1981)
- Government support for exports: A second-best alternative (1982, with Morris H. Crawford)
- Banks, petrodollars, and sovereign debtors: Blood from a stone? (1986, with Charles K. Ebinger)
- China, Hong Kong, Taiwan, and the world trading system (1990)

== Personal life ==
Penelope Hartland married fellow researcher Howard E. Thunberg in 1946. They divorced in 1971. She died in 2004, aged 86 years, in Washington, D.C. Her papers are in the Christine Dunlap Farnham Archive at the John Hay Library, Brown University.
