= Thelma Brumfield Dunn =

American medical researcher

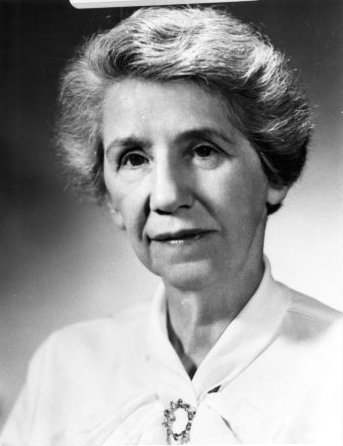
- Thelma B. Dunn (1970), from the Harold L. Stewart Photograph Collection, Office of History, National Institutes of Health.
- Born: Thelma Flournoy Brumfield; February 6, 1900; Renan, Virginia, U.S.
- Died: December 31, 1992 (aged 92); Lynchburg, Virginia, U.S.
- Education: Cornell University; University of Virginia School of Medicine
- Known for: Research on tumors in mice
- Scientific career
- Fields: Oncology
- Workplaces: National Cancer Institute

Thelma Flournoy Brumfield Dunn (February 6, 1900 – December 31, 1992) was a medical researcher whose work on mice led to significant advances in human cancer research.

== Early life ==
Thelma Flournoy Brumfield was born in Renan, Virginia, the daughter of William Andrew Brumfield and Effie Flournoy Thornton Brumfield. Her father was a physician and a college health officer.

== Education ==
Brumfield attended public schools in both Richmond and Lynchburg. She attended Cornell University, transferred to Westhampton College for one year, then returned to Cornell University where she won the Guilford Prize for excelling in an English prose composition, for an essay entitled "Virginia Tobacco." That same year, she received an A.B with honors in entomology. She earned a medical degree in 1926 at the University of Virginia School of Medicine, and then began an internship at Bellevue Hospital.

== Medical research ==
In 1942, Dunn became a fellow at the National Cancer Institute. She stayed at the institute as a staff pathologist beginning in 1947, until her retirement in 1970. She was head of the Cancer Induction and Pathogenesis Section of the pathology department.

Dunn's work involved the origins and development of cancer in laboratory mice. She developed methods of inducing malignant tumors in the stomachs and intestines of experimental animals and studied the behavior of the cancer cells that resulted. Dunn is known as the "First Lady of Cancer Research". According to Harold L. Stewart of the National Cancer Institute, Dunn's important contributions to the field of cancer research include her studies of mammary tumors, reticulum-cell sarcomas, leukemia, plasma-cell tumors, mast-cell tumors, the granular-cell tumors, cervical cancer and the common liver tumor of the mouse. Stewart also mentions Dunn's discoveries the protein-secreting, plasma-cell tumors that originate in the ileocecal region of mice, a finding that initiated a program of animal research that's led to a better understanding of the fatality of human cancer. She developed lines of a transplantable mast-cell tumor of a mouse, now known as "Dunn cells", used widely in laboratory studies.

== Publications ==
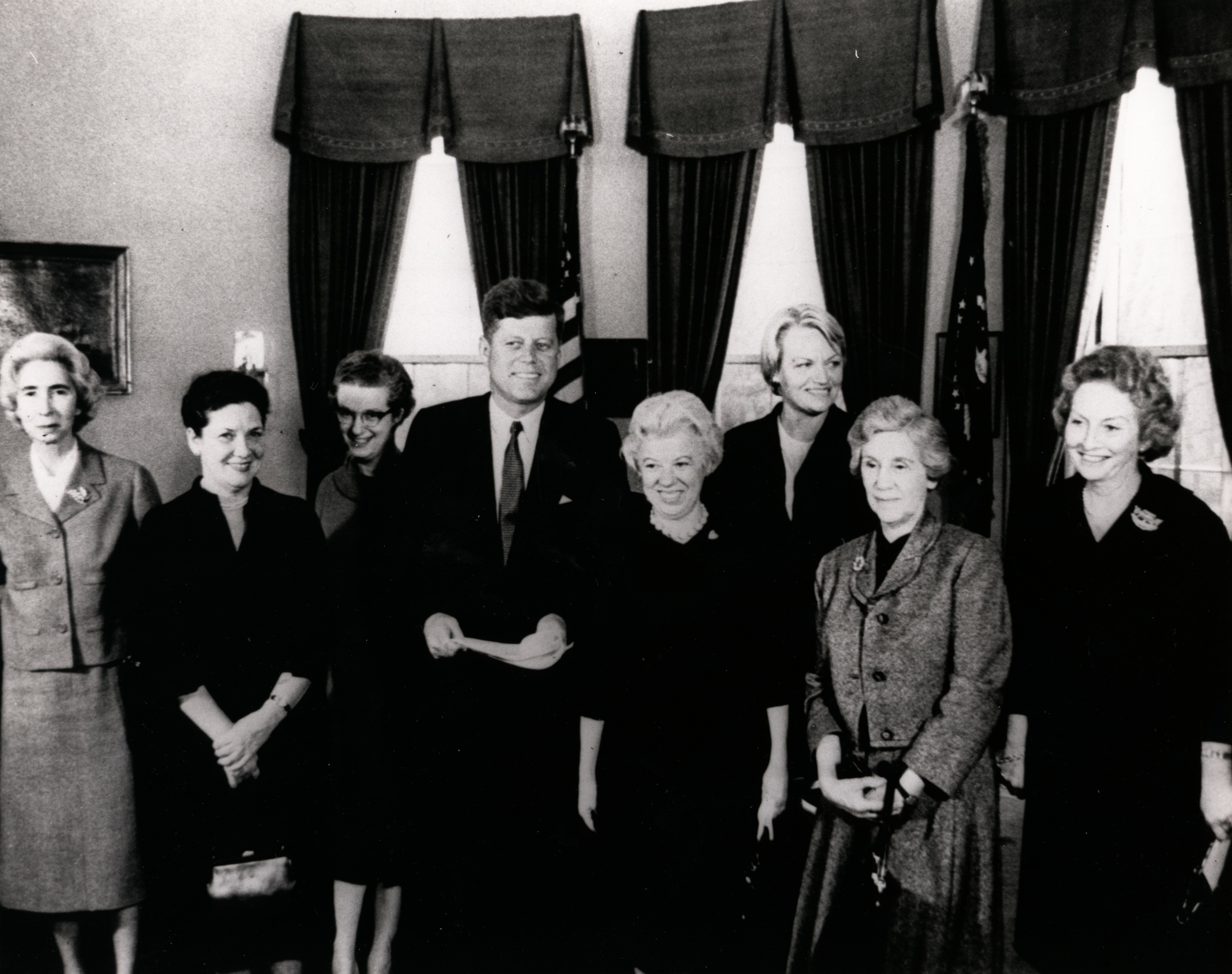
President John F. Kennedy meets with recipients of the 1962 Federal Woman’s Award for outstanding contributions to government on February 22, 1962. Shown from left to right are Dr. Allene R. Jeanes, Research Chemist at the Department of Agriculture; Evelyn Harrison, Deputy Director of the Bureau of Programs and Standard at the Civil Service Commission; Dr. Nancy Grace Roman, Chief of Astronomy and Solar Physics at the National Aeronautics and Space Administration (NASA); President Kennedy; Margaret H. Brass, Attorney at the Department of Justice; Katherine W. Bracken, Director of the Office of Central American and Panamanian Affairs at the Department of State; Dr. Thelma B. Dunn, cancer researcher at the National Cancer Institute; Katie Louchheim, Deputy Assistant Secretary of State for Public Affairs (accompanying the recipients). Photo taken in the Oval Office of the White House in Washington, D.C.

Dunn's research publications published definitive articles on the normal and pathologic anatomy of the kidney, the adrenal gland amyloidosis, congenital and induced ocular lesions, and the spontaneous lesions that accompany the aging process and which constitute the pathologic basis for the so called "geriatric diseases". Article titles included "Attempt to Detect a Mammary Tumor-Agent in Strain C Mice by X-Radiation" (1950), "Transplantation of Hepatomas in Mice" (1955), "Morphology of Mammary Tumors in Mice" (1958), "Studies of the Mammary-Tumor Agent of Strain RIII Mice" (1961), "Further Studies of the Mammary Tumor Agent of Strain RIII Mice" (1962), "Occurrence of Tumors in Wild House Mice" (1962), "Histology of Some Neoplasms and Non-Neo-plastic Lesions Found in Wild Mice Maintained Under Laboratory Conditions" (1963), "Attempts to Detect Nodule-Inducing Virus in Strain RIII Mice" (1970). In retirement she wrote a book, The Unseen Fight Against Cancer (1975), explaining cancer research for a general readership.

== Awards and recognitions ==
While attending Cornell University and the Medical School of the University of Virginia, Thelma Brumfield's peers elected her to membership in the honorary societies of Phi Beta Kappa and Alpha Omega Alpha. In 1958, the National Institutes of Health chose Dunn as one of six members of the delegation of distinguished American women physicians sent to the Soviet Union for the exchange of information and views on science and cancer. Also in 1958, the American Medical Women's Association elected Dunn "Woman of the Year" for the District of Columbia. In 1959, the Washington Society of Pathologists elected her its president. In 1961, the American Association for Cancer Research also elected her its president. Dunn was the first woman to be elected to both organizations. In 1962, Dunn met with John F. Kennedy as a recipient of the Federal Woman's Award for outstanding contributions to the government.

== Personal life ==
Thelma Brumfield married William Leroy Dunn, a fellow medical doctor, in 1929. They had three children. Their son John Thornton Dunn (1932-2004) became a medical researcher prominent in the study of thyroid disorders and public health. Thelma B. Dunn was widowed when W. Leroy Dunn died in 1982; she died in 1992, aged 92, at a retirement home in Lynchburg, Virginia. Her papers are archived at the University of Virginia.
