= Cleo S. Cason =

American librarian

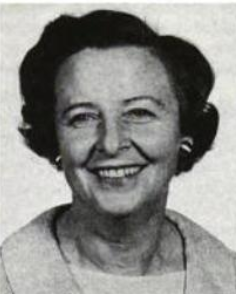
- Cleo S. Cason, from a 1971 publication of the United States Army
- Born: Dorothy Cleo Stargel; June 24, 1910; Dahlonega, Georgia, U.S.
- Died: July 27, 2003 (93 years); Jacksonville, Florida, U.S.
- Occupation: Librarian

Dorothy Cleo Stargel Cason (June 24, 1910 – July 27, 2003) was an American librarian. She was founding supervisor of the Redstone Scientific Information Center, supervising the technical library at the United States Army's Redstone Arsenal, from 1949 to 1974.

== Early life and education ==
Cason was born in Dahlonega, Georgia, the daughter of John Jones Stargel and Georgia Jones Stargel. She attended North Georgia College in the 1920s. She earned a master's degree in library science the University of Chicago. She earned an LL.B. degree from the Chicago School of Law in 1949. She attended classes at the University of Alabama in Huntsville in the early 1950s.

== Career ==
Cason worked at an insurance agency in Chattanooga as a young woman. In 1932, she was chosen as "Miss Insurance" by the National Association of Insurance Agents, and was hostess at the association's annual meeting in Philadelphia.

Cason began working at Redstone Arsenal in 1944 as an administrative assistant. In 1949, she was asked to organize the arsenal's library, which became the Redstone Scientific Information Center, with over a million books, documents, journals, and audiovisual materials by the 1970s. She was also associated with the George C. Marshall Space Center in Huntsville.

Cason was president of the Alabama chapter of the Special Libraries Association from 1955 to 1956. She was president of the college, university and Special Libraries Division of the Alabama Library Association from 1959 to 1960. In 1960 she spoke on a panel titled "Personnel Standards for Military Librarians" at the fourth annual Military Librarians Workshop, held in Washington, D.C.

Cason was nominated for the Federal Woman's Award in 1971, and received a Meritorious Civilian Service Award in 1974. She retired from Army civilian service in 1974, and became a law librarian in Madison County, Alabama. In 1992 she receive the Liberty Bell Award from the Huntsville-Madison County Bar Associations. She was a member of the Editorial Advisors Board for the Huntsville-Madison Historical Society.

== Publications ==
- "The Early Years of Redstone Arsenal" (1971, with Winona Stroup)

== Personal life ==
Cleo Stargel married Army researcher Charles Monroe Cason in 1929. They had a son, Charles, who became a physicist at Redstone Arsenal. Her husband died in 1983. Cason died in 2003, at the age of 93, in Jacksonville, Florida. The Redstone Scientific Information Center was closed in 2019, as a cost-saving measure.
