= Crown Dick =

- Based on: "Crown Dick" (story)
- Written by: Kim Yong-ik
- Directed by: Ossie Davis
- Starring: Don Reed; Peter Yoshida; Ruby Dee
- Country of origin: United States
- Original language: English

Production
- Producers: Ozzie Brown; Ossie Davis; Nora Davis Day
- Editor: Kevin Lee

Original release
- Release: May 4, 1987

Crown Dick is a 1987 drama film directed by Ossie Davis.

== Synopsis ==
This drama presents the promise of the American dream as seen through the eyes of two different men. Dick Johnson, a bitter, unemployed black veteran, is visited by his Korean friend Kim, who has received a scholarship to study medicine in the U.S.

== Cast ==
- Don Reed - Dick Johnson
- Peter Yoshida - Kim
- Ruby Dee - Johnson's Mother
- Freda Foh Shon - Soon-Ja
- Tim Williams - Clown
- Torrence Hayes - Boy on Beach

== Broadcast ==
The TV movie was broadcast as a segment of the PBS series Ossie & Ruby starring Ossie Davis and his wife Ruby Dee that ran from 1986 to 1987.
