= Eileen R. Donovan =

American diplomat (1915–1996)

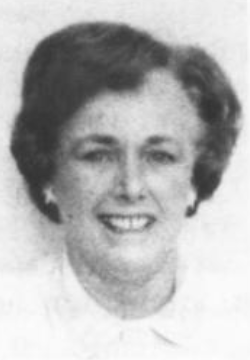
- Eileen R. Donovan, from a 1968 publication of the US Department of State
- Born: April 13, 1915; Boston, Massachusetts, U.S.
- Died: December 19, 1996 (aged 81); Spring Hill, Florida, U.S.
- Occupation(s): Educator, diplomat, ambassador

Eileen Roberta Donovan (April 13, 1915 – December 19, 1996) was an American educator who served as the American Ambassador to Barbados from 1969 to 1974, after being a consul in Barbados in 1960, and consul general in 1962.

== Early life and education ==
Donovan was born in Boston on April 13, 1915, the daughter of William F. Donovan. Her father was a fire chief. She attended Girls' Latin School in Boston, and graduated from Boston Teachers College with a bachelor's degree in 1936. She earned a master's degree in education in 1937. She attended Harvard Graduate School of Public Administration as a Foreign Service Institute Fellow and received a master of public administration degree from Harvard in 1957. During World War II, she received Japanese language training at the University of Virginia and the University of Michigan. "I never learned to type because I figured if I did I'd have to do it," she explained later of her preparation for government work.

== Biography ==
Donovan was a history teacher in the Boston Public Schools from 1938 to 1943.

During World War II, she served in the Women's Army Corps. In 1945, she was assistant to Douglas MacArthur at the Tokyo headquarters of the Supreme Commander for the Allied Powers. While in Japan, she worked on school curriculum reform and women's opportunities for higher education, working with other American educators including Virginia Crocheron Gildersleeve and Charles S. Johnson, and also with Japanese educators.

Donovan joined the Foreign Service in 1948. She was a political liaison officer in the Philippines, Italy, and Japan, and served as chief of the Southern Europe branch of the Bureau of Intelligence and Research in the 1950s. She was a consul in Barbados in 1960, and in 1962 became consul general. From 1965 to 1969, she was based in Washington, as assistant director of the Office of Caribbean Affairs. From 1969 to 1974, she was the American ambassador to Barbados. She retired in 1974, after a back injury.

In 1989, Donovan gave an oral history interview to the Association for Diplomatic Studies and Training.

== Honors ==
In 1969, Donovan won the Federal Woman's Award.

== Personal life and death ==
Donovan died on December 19, 1996, at the age of 81, in Spring Hill, Florida.
