= Nina Bencich Woodside =

American physician

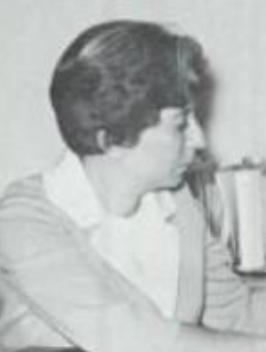
- Nina Bencich Woodside, from a 1968 publication of the U. S. Civil Service Commission
- Born: Nina Libertas Bencich; June 1, 1931; Washington, D.C.
- Died: July 11, 1997 (aged 66); Salida, Colorado
- Occupations: Psychiatrist, public health official, college professor
- Known for: Federal Woman's Award

Nina Bencich Woodside (June 1, 1931 – July 11, 1997) was an American psychiatrist, college professor, and public health official. She received the Federal Woman's Award in 1968, and was founding director of the Center for Women in Medicine at Drexel University College of Medicine in the 1970s.

== Early life and education ==
Nina Libertas Bencich was born in Washington, D.C., the daughter of Peter Bencich and Sara Peltz Bencich. Her father was born in Austria, and her mother was born in Russia. Bencich earned a bachelor's degree in zoology from George Washington University in 1953. She earned her medical credentials at the Woman's Medical College of Pennsylvania, with further studies in public health at Johns Hopkins University.

== Career ==
Woodside began her career in public health in Virginia, serving as a health officer in Fairfax County and Arlington County. At the District of Columbia Department of Public Health, she was head of the Bureau of Chronic Disease Control, and associate director for planning and research. During her tenure at the Bureau of Chronic Disease Control, Woodside improved tuberculosis prevention and treatment in the city, promoted anti-smoking campaigns, and created programs to serve elderly residents of the city's public housing.

In 1968, Woodside received the Federal Woman's Award, presented by Lyndon B. Johnson "for her superior leadership, initiative, and professional and administrative competence in developing a new range of public health services in adult health and geriatrics". In 1969, she received an annual award from the national board of the Woman's Medical College of Pennsylvania. In 1970 was acting director of the District of Columbia Health Services Administration.

Woodside was an assistant professor at Georgetown University and taught public health courses in its school of nursing. She was also an associate professor of healthcare administration at George Washington University. In the 1970s, she was founding director of the Center for Women in Medicine at Drexel University College of Medicine, where she also taught courses. She wrote a textbook, Introduction to Health Planning (1979).

Woodside had a private psychiatric practice in her later years, and was a consultant on international public health.

== Personal life ==
Nina Bencich married dentist and pilot Byron Crosby Woodside in 1955. They had six children. Both Woodsides died in a plane crash in Salida, Colorado, on July 11, 1997, along with her cousin and her cousin's husband; she was 66 years old.
