= Jean Apgar =

American biochemist (1936–present)

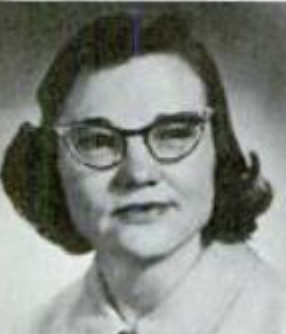
- Jean Apgar, from a 1970 publication of the United States federal government
- Born: Barbara Jean Francis; March 4, 1936 (age 90); Tyler, Texas, U.S.
- Education: Texas Woman's University; Cornell University
- Occupation: Biochemist

Barbara Jean Francis Apgar (born March 4, 1936) is an American biochemist. She worked on important research on ribonucleic acids (RNA), and on zinc deficiency as a risk factor in reproduction. She won the Federal Woman's Award in 1970, and the Arthur S. Flemming Award in 1973.

== Early life and education ==
Barbara Jean Francis was born in Tyler, Texas, the daughter of Albert Edward Francis and Mary Agnes Linehan Francis. Her father was a railroad engineer. She completed undergraduate studies in chemistry at Texas Woman's University, and earned her master's degree and Ph.D. at Cornell University. Her 1959 master's thesis was titled "The effect of conventional and electronic cooking on the thiamine content of pork patties, roasts, and chops"; her 1964 doctoral dissertation was titled Separation of E. coli leucine-acceptor RNAs.

== Career ==
Apgar worked for the United States Department of Agriculture (USDA) as a biochemist in the Plant, Soil and Nutrition Laboratory at Cornell University. She was a member of a team studying the structure of ribonucleic acids (RNA) with Robert W. Holley. The team won a 1965 USDA Distinguished Service Award, and Holley received a Nobel Prize in 1968, for that work. "Being the first person to do something has a certain fascination," she later wrote, "but it isn't an experience most of us expect to have." Her research in the 1970s focused on the role of zinc in reproductive physiology, and on zinc deficiency as a maternal and fetal health risk during pregnancy and delivery.

In 1970, she was one of the six recipients of the Federal Woman's Award, and the youngest woman to receive that honor. In 1972, she received an Arthur S. Flemming Award, given annually to ten promising young employees of the federal government.

== Selected publications ==
Between 1959 and 1997, Apgar published dozens of research articles in academic journals including Journal of the American Dietetic Association, Journal of the American Chemical Society, Journal of Biological Chemistry, American Journal of Physiology, Journal of Nutritional Biochemistry, Journal of Animal Science, and Journal of Nutrition. Some of her articles include the following:

=== Food science projects ===
- "Cooking Pork Electronically: Effect on Cooking Time, Losses, and Quality" (1959, with Nancy Cox, Irene Downey, and Faith Fenton)

=== RNA work with R. W. Holley group ===
- "Nucleotide and oligonucleotide compositions of the alanine-, valine-, and tyrosine-acceptor 'soluble' ribonucleic acids of yeast" (1961, with Robert W. Holley, Susan H. Merrill, and Paul L. Zubkoff)
- "Fractionation of yeast amino acid-acceptor ribonucleic acids by countercurrent distribution" (1961, with B. P. Doctor and R. W. Holley)
- "Purification of the alanine-, valine-, histidine-, and tyrosine-acceptor ribonucleic acids from yeast" (1962, with Robert W. Holley and Susan H. Merrill)
- "Structure of a ribonucleic acid" (1965, with R. W. Holley, G. A. Everett, J. T. Madison, M. Marquisee, S. H. Merrill, J. R. Penswick, and A. Zamir)

=== Work on zinc deficiency ===
- "Effect of Zinc Deficiency on Parturition in the Rat" (1968)
- "Effect of Zinc Deficiency on Maintenance of Pregnancy in the Rat" (1970)
- "Effect of a Low Zinc Diet during Gestation on Reproduction in the Rabbit" (1971)
- "Effect of Zinc Deprivation from Day 12, 15, or 18 of Gestation on Parturition in the Rat" (1972)
- "Effect of Zinc Repletion Late in Gestation on Parturition in the Zinc-deficient Rat" (1973)
- "Effect of Restricted Feed Intake on the Sensitivity of the Bovine Corpus Luteum to LH In Vitro" (1975, with Douglas Aspros, James E. Hixon, Raymond R. Saatman, and William Hansel)
- "Effect on the Ewe and Lamb of Low Zinc Intake throughout Pregnancy" (1985, with James A. Fitzgerald)
- "Zinc and reproduction: an update" (1992)

=== Later collaborations ===
- "Apparent absorption and retention of Ca, Cu, Mg, Mn, and Zn from a diet containing bran" (1986, with R. Schwartz and E. M. Wien)
- "Marginal vitamin A intake during pregnancy in Guinea pigs: effect on immune parameters in neonate" (1995, with T. R. Kramer and J. Cecil Smith)
- "Serum carotenoid concentrations and their reproducibility in children in Belize" (1996, with D. Makdani, A. L. Sowell, E. W. Gunter, A. Hegar, W. Potts, D. Rao, A. Wilcox, J. C. Smith)
- "The gerbil: A model for studying the metabolism of beta-carotene and minerals" (1997, with William A. House and J. Cecil Smith)

== Personal life ==
Jean Francis married Ronald W. Apgar in 1958; they lived in Ithaca, New York, and had three children. "The children went to the laboratory with me," she explained, adding "I have very efficient children." Her son Michael died in a car accident in 1985.
