= Anne Mason Roberts =

American government official (1910–1971)

- Anne Mason Roberts, from a 1962 magazine.
- Born: 1910; Cincinnati, Ohio
- Died: October 17, 1971 (aged 60–61); New York City
- Occupation: Government official

Anne Mason Roberts (1910 – October 17, 1971) was an American government official. She was the highest-ranking woman at the United States Department of Housing and Urban Development (HUD), when she served as deputy regional administrator from 1962 to 1964, and from 1966 to 1971. From 1964 to 1966, she was appointed director of New York City's Anti-Poverty Operations Board, under mayor Robert F. Wagner.

== Early life ==
Anne Mason was born in Cincinnati, Ohio. Her father was a postal carrier; her mother was disabled by severe arthritis. She earned a bachelor's degree from the University of Cincinnati in 1928, and a master's degree in psychology in 1936.

== Career ==
Mason taught school in Cincinnati as a young woman. She credited her teaching experience with providing her insights into urban poverty. In 1945, Roberts left teaching for a consumer relations job in the Office of Price Administration. She also wrote articles for the Pittsburgh Courier, where her husband was a reporter and editor.

She was the highest-ranking woman at the United States Department of Housing and Urban Development (HUD), when she served as deputy regional administrator from 1962 to 1964, and from 1966 to 1971 covering the New York and New England regions. From 1964 to 1966, she was appointed director of New York City's Anti-Poverty Operations Board, under mayor Robert F. Wagner.

In 1967, Roberts was one of the six recipients of the Federal Woman's Award. In 1968, she was named the Seagram Vanguard Society Award winner, and Woman of the Year by the National Urban League.

Roberts was a member of the National Urban League and the National Council of Negro Women.

== Personal life ==
Anne Mason married twice; her second husband was journalist Stanley Roberts. She was stepmother to Roberts' three daughters, Alma, Stanlyn, and Judith. Anne Mason Roberts died in 1971, aged 61 years, at her home in New York City.
