= Ossie Davis =

American actor, director, writer, and activist (1917–2005)

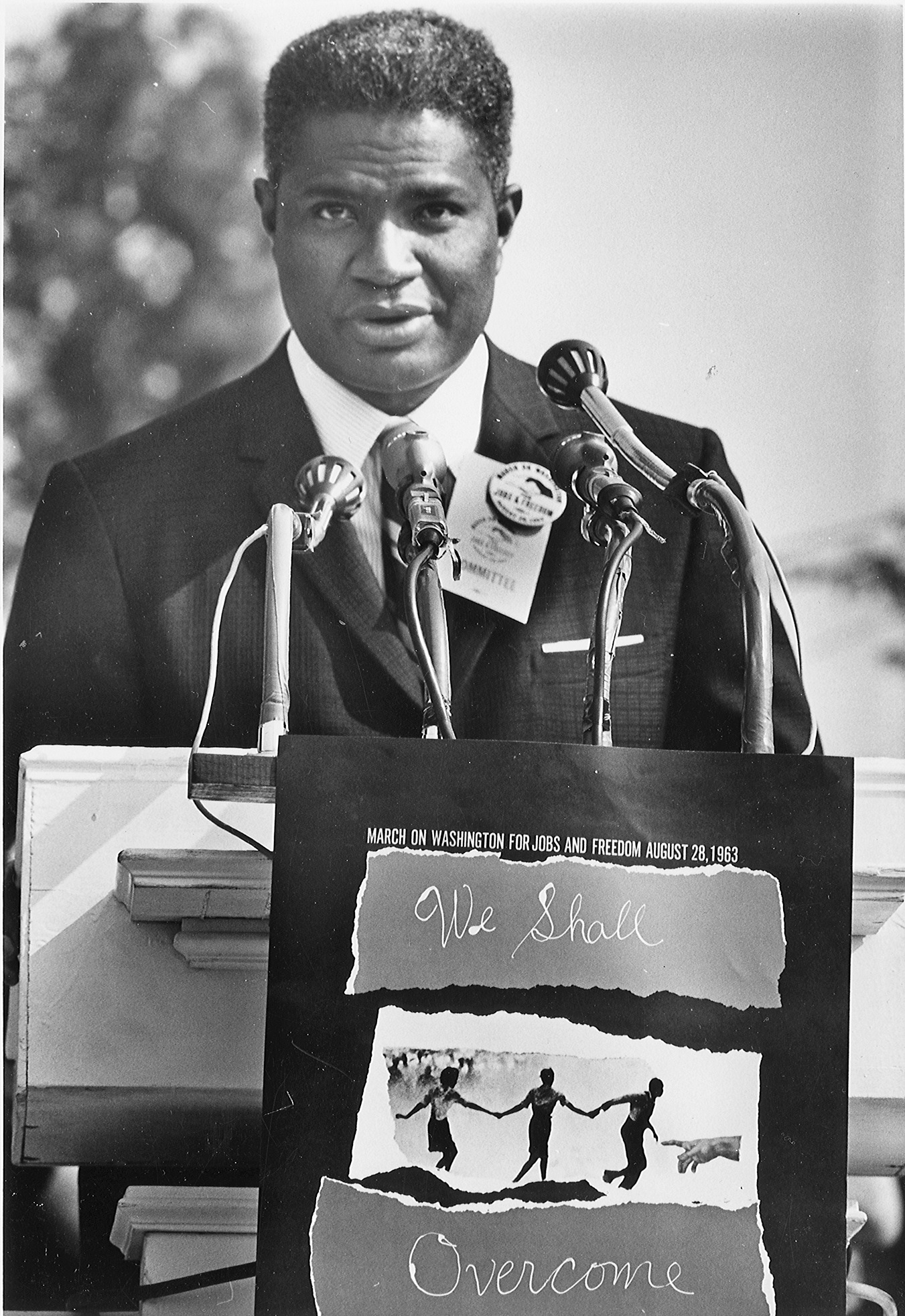
- Davis at the 1963 March on Washington
- Born: Raiford Chatman Davis; December 18, 1917; Cogdell, Georgia, U.S.
- Died: February 4, 2005 (aged 87); Miami Beach, Florida, U.S.
- Education: Columbia University
- Occupations: Actor; director; poet; playwright; author; activist
- Years active: 1939–2005
- Spouse: Ruby Dee (m. 1948)
- Children: 3, including Guy Davis

Ossie Davis (born Raiford Chatman Davis; December 18, 1917 – February 4, 2005) was an American actor, director, writer, and activist. He was married to Ruby Dee, with whom he frequently performed, from 1948 until his death. He received numerous accolades, including an Emmy, a Grammy and a Writers Guild of America Award as well as nominations for four additional Emmy Awards, a Golden Globe Award, and Tony Award. Davis was inducted into the American Theater Hall of Fame in 1994 and received the National Medal of Arts in 1995 and the Kennedy Center Honors in 2004.

Davis started his career in theatre acting with the Rose McClendon Players in the 1940s. He made his Broadway debut acting in the post-World War II play Jeb (1946). He earned a Tony Award for Best Featured Actor in a Musical nomination for his role in Jamaica (1958). He wrote and starred as the title character in the satirical farce Purlie Victorious (1961), which was adapted into a 1963 film and 1970 musical.

Davis's credits as a film director include Cotton Comes to Harlem (1970), Black Girl (1972), and Gordon's War (1973). He was nominated for a Golden Globe Award for Best Supporting Actor for The Scalphunters (1968). Davis also acted in The Hill (1965). A Man Called Adam (1966), Let's Do It Again (1975), School Daze (1988), Do the Right Thing (1989), Grumpy Old Men (1993), The Client (1994) and Dr. Dolittle (1998).

For his portrayal of Martin Luther King Sr. in the miniseries King (1978) he was nominated for the Primetime Emmy Award for Outstanding Supporting Actor in a Drama Series. He was also Emmy-nominated for his roles in Teacher, Teacher (1969), Miss Evers' Boys (1997), and The L Word (2005). He won the Grammy Award for Best Spoken Word Album with his wife Ruby Dee for Ossie and Ruby (2005).

== Early life ==
Raiford Chatman Davis was born in Cogdell, Georgia, the son of Kince Charles Davis, a railway construction engineer, and his wife, Laura (née Cooper; July 9, 1898 – June 6, 2004). He inadvertently became known as "Ossie" when his birth certificate was being filed and his mother's pronunciation of his name as "R. C. Davis" was misheard by the Clinch County courthouse clerk. Davis experienced racism from an early age when the KKK threatened to shoot his father, whose job they felt was too advanced for a Black man to have. His siblings included scientist William Conan Davis, social worker Essie Davis Morgan, pharmacist Kenneth Curtis Davis, and biology teacher James Davis.

Following the wishes of his parents, he attended Howard University but dropped out in 1939 to fulfill his desire for an acting career in New York after a recommendation by Alain Locke; he later attended Columbia University School of General Studies. His acting career began in 1939 with the Rose McClendon Players in Harlem. During World War II, Davis served in the United States Army in the Medical Corps. He made his film debut in 1950 in the Sidney Poitier film No Way Out.

== Career ==
=== 1939–1963: Acting debut and Broadway work ===
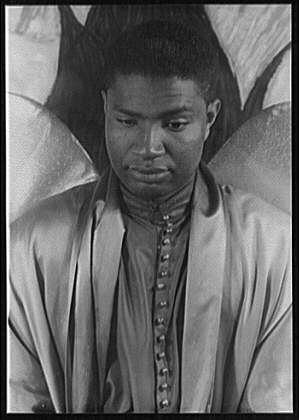
Portrait by Carl Van Vechten, 1951

When Davis wanted to pursue a career in acting, he ran into the usual roadblocks that Black people suffered at that time, as they generally could only portray stereotypical characters such as Stepin Fetchit. Instead, he tried to follow the example of Sidney Poitier and play more distinguished characters. When he found it necessary to play a Pullman porter or a butler, he played those characters realistically, not as a caricature.

Davis performed in the musical Jamaica, which earned him a Tony Award for Best Featured Actor in a Musical nomination in 1958. In 1961, he wrote and starred in the Broadway play Purlie Victorious, a farce satirizing the confederate south. Davis portrayed the title character Purlie Victorious Judson, acting opposite Ruby Dee and Alan Alda. The play was adapted into a film titled Gone Are the Days!, released in 1963. The Broadway cast reprised their roles for the film. Howard Taubman for The New York Times wrote of the play: "It is marvelously exhilarating to hear the Negro speak for himself, especially when he does so in the fullness of his native gusto and the enveloping heartiness of his overflowing laughter."

=== 1964–1989: Directorial work and commercial success ===
Early television appearances for Davis included The Defenders, Car 54, Where Are You?, The Fugitive, and Bonanza. In addition to acting, Davis, along with Melvin Van Peebles and Gordon Parks, was one of the notable Black directors of his generation: he directed movies such as Cotton Comes to Harlem (1970), Black Girl (1972), and Gordon's War (1973). Along with Bill Cosby and Poitier, Davis was one of a handful of Black actors able to find commercial success while avoiding stereotypical roles prior to 1970, which also included a significant role in the Otto Preminger directed drama The Cardinal (1963) and the Sidney Lumet prison drama The Hill (1965). He acted in the musical drama A Man Called Adam (1966), performing alongside Sammy Davis Jr., Louis Armstrong, and Cicely Tyson. He played Joseph Lee in the Sydney Pollack-directed western drama. The Scalphunters, acting alongside Burt Lancaster and Shelley Winters. For his performance, Davis received a nomination for the Golden Globe Award for Best Supporting Actor – Motion Picture. Critic Roger Ebert of The Chicago Sun-Times praised Davis's performance in the film writing: "Davis, as an educated slave, is gradually initiated into the brutal realities of frontier life. [He] emerges as a genuine comic talent in a very demanding role (actually the lead, although Lancaster gets top billing). His character changes from an Uncle Tom to a rough-and-ready cowboy before your very eyes."

During this time, he acted in the western comedy Sam Whiskey (1969) with Burt Reynolds and Angie Dickinson, the drama Slaves (1969), starring Dionne Warwick, and the action comedy Hot Stuff (1979) with Dom DeLuise and Suzanne Pleshette. Davis starred with Cosby and Poitier in the 1975 film Let's Do It Again. As a playwright, Davis wrote Paul Robeson: All-American, which is frequently performed in theatre programs for young audiences.

In 1976, Davis appeared on Muhammad Ali's novelty album for children, The Adventures of Ali and His Gang vs. Mr. Tooth Decay. He starred as Martin Luther King Sr. in the NBC miniseries King (1978), for which he received a nomination for the Primetime Emmy Award for Outstanding Supporting Actor in a Drama Series, and played Dad Jones in the miniseries. Roots: The Next Generations (1979). Davis found recognition late in his life by working in several of director's Spike Lee's films, including School Daze (1988), Do the Right Thing (1989), Jungle Fever (1991), Malcolm X (1992), Get on the Bus (1996), and She Hate Me (2004). For the final moments of Malcolm X, Davis, in voiceover, recited the actual eulogy that he wrote and delivered at Malcolm's funeral 27 years earlier.

=== 1990–2005: Later work and final roles ===
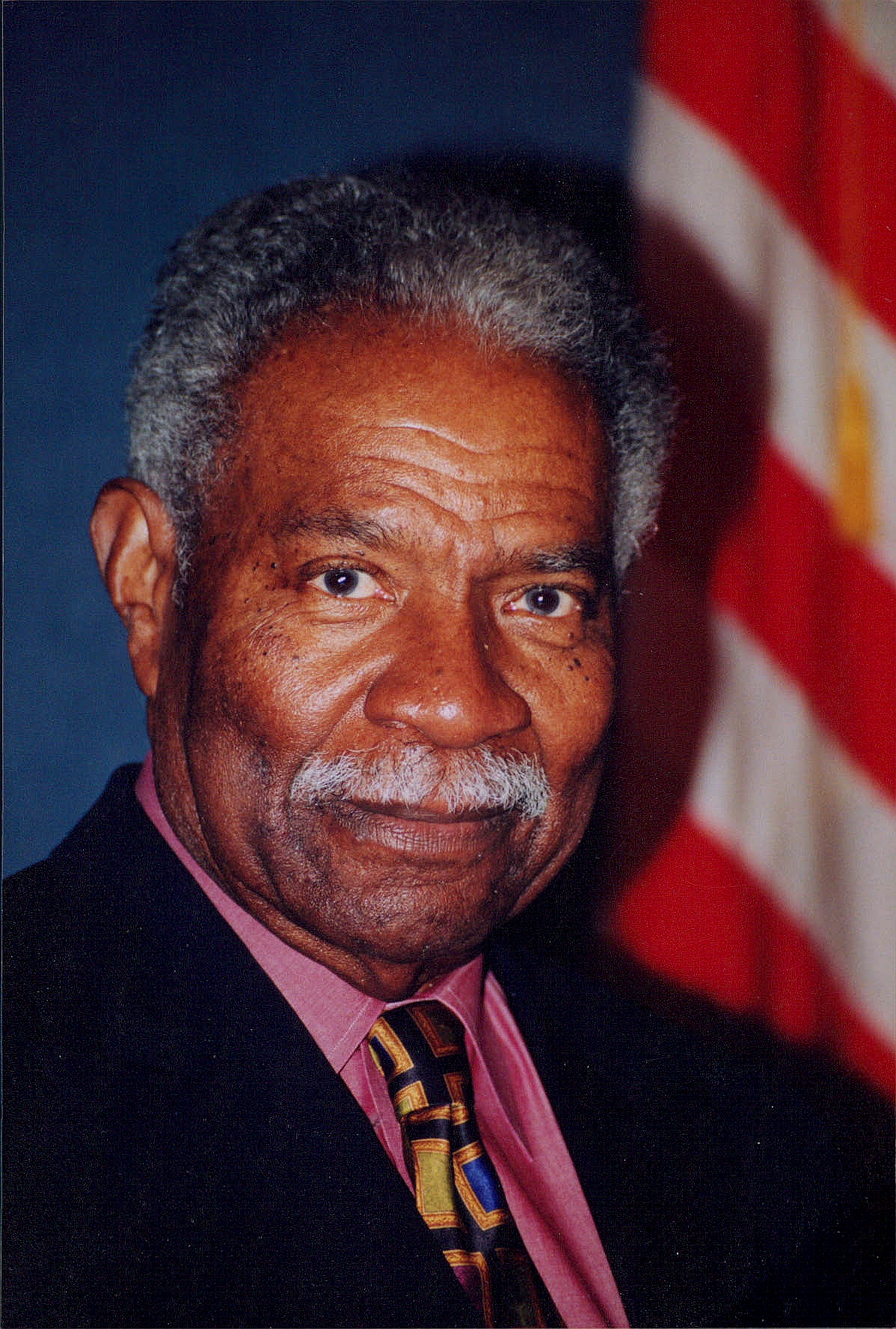
Davis in 2000

Davis found work as a commercial voice-over artist and served as the narrator of the early-1990s CBS sitcom Evening Shade, starring Burt Reynolds, where he also played one of the residents of a small southern town. Davis and Reynolds had also worked together on Reynolds' previous TV series, B.L. Stryker (1989–1990), aired as part of the ABC Mystery Movie series. He also appeared in several popular 1990s films, including the studio comedies Grumpy Old Men (1993) starring Jack Lemmon and Walter Matthau, and Cop and a Half (1993) with Burt Reynolds, as well as the John Grisham drama film The Client (1994) starring Susan Sarandon and Tommy Lee Jones. He reunited with Spike Lee acting in the film Get on the Bus (1996), and appeared in his HBO documentary 4 Little Girls (1997), which was nominated for the Academy Award for Best Documentary Feature. In 1998 he acted in the Eddie Murphy led comedy film Dr. Dolittle. In 1999, he appeared as a theater caretaker in the Trans-Siberian Orchestra film The Ghosts of Christmas Eve, which was released on DVD two years later. For many years, he hosted the annual National Memorial Day Concert from Washington, D.C.

In 1994, Davis played Judge Richard Farris in the Stephen King miniseries The Stand. From 1995 to 1996, he played Judge Harry Roosevelt in the CBS legal drama The Client (reprising his role from the 1994 film). Davis played Erasmus Jones in Promised Land from 1996 to 1998. The series was a spinoff from Touched by an Angel where he played multiple characters from 1996 to 2000. He played Mr. Evers in the HBO film. Miss Evers' Boys (1997), starring Laurence Fishburne and Alfre Woodard. The film won the Primetime Emmy Award for Outstanding Television Movie. That same year he acted in the Showtime television film 12 Angry Men (1997), playing Juror #2. He acted in an ensemble cast acting alongside Courtney B. Vance, George C. Scott, James Gandolfini, Jack Lemmon, and Hume Cronyn. He voiced Anansi the spider on the PBS children's television series Sesame Street in its animation segments. He also narrated the HBO Storybook Musicals adaptation of The Red Shoes aired on February 7, 1990. In 1997 he was the narrator in Ken Burns' two-part documentary on Thomas Jefferson. In 2000, he voiced the role of Yar in Disney's live-action animated film Dinosaur.

From 1999 to 2000, he played Mr. Parker in the NBC crime drama Third Watch. He also took roles in the TV film Deacons for Defense (2003), and episodes of Cosby and JAG. Davis's last role was a several episode Emmy-nominated guest role on the Showtime drama series The L Word, as a father struggling with the acceptance of his daughter Bette (Jennifer Beals) parenting a child with her lesbian partner. In his final episodes, his character took ill and died. His wife Ruby Dee was present during the filming of his own death scene. That episode, which aired shortly after Davis's own death, aired with a dedication to the actor. After Davis's death, actor Dennis Haysbert portrayed him in the 2015 film Experimenter.

== Personal life ==
=== Marriage ===
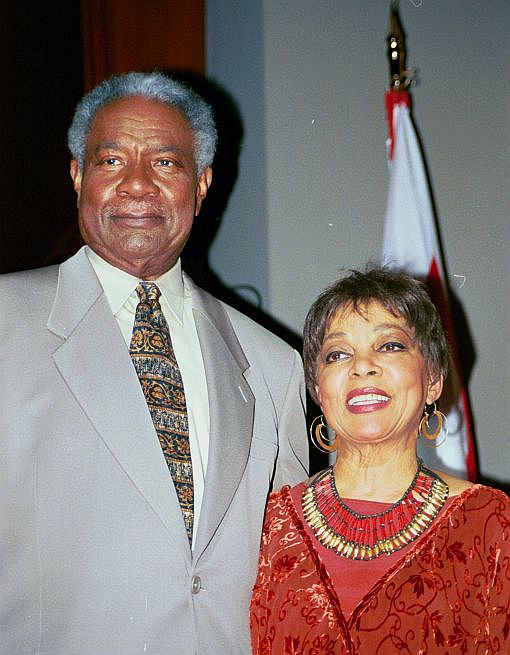
Davis and Dee

In 1948, Davis married actress Ruby Dee, whom he had met on the set of Robert Ardrey's 1946 play Jeb. In their joint autobiography With Ossie and Ruby, they described their decision to have an open marriage, later changing their minds. In the mid-1960s they moved from their long-time home in Mt. Vernon, NY to the New York suburb of New Rochelle, where they remained ever after. Their son Guy Davis is a blues musician and former actor, who appeared in the film Beat Street (1984) and the daytime soap opera One Life to Live. Their daughters are Nora Davis Day and Hasna Muhammad.

=== Political activism ===
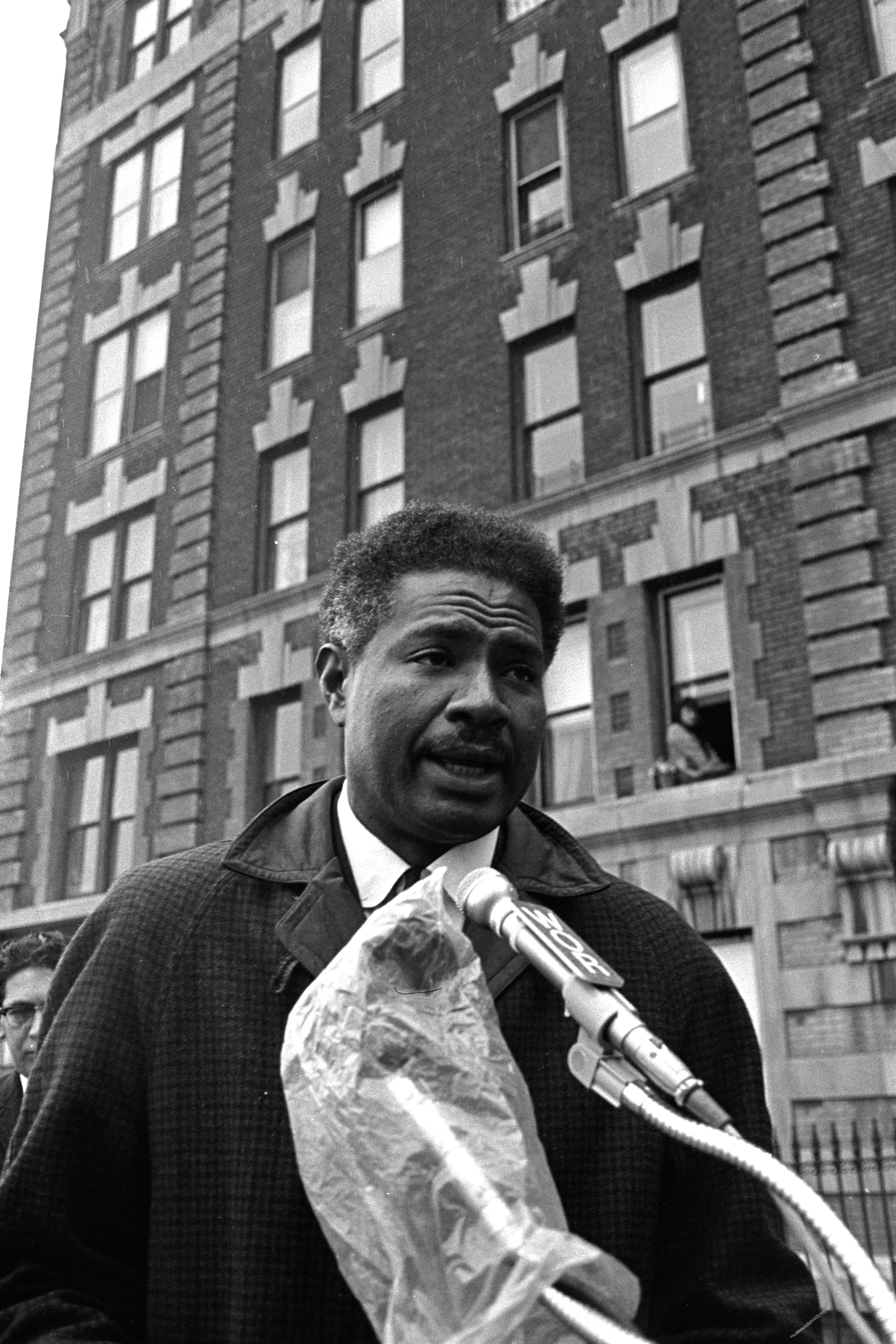
Davis at the dedication of Freedom Place in Manhattan, named for slain civil rights activists James Chaney, Andrew Goodman, and Michael Schwerner, November 25, 1967

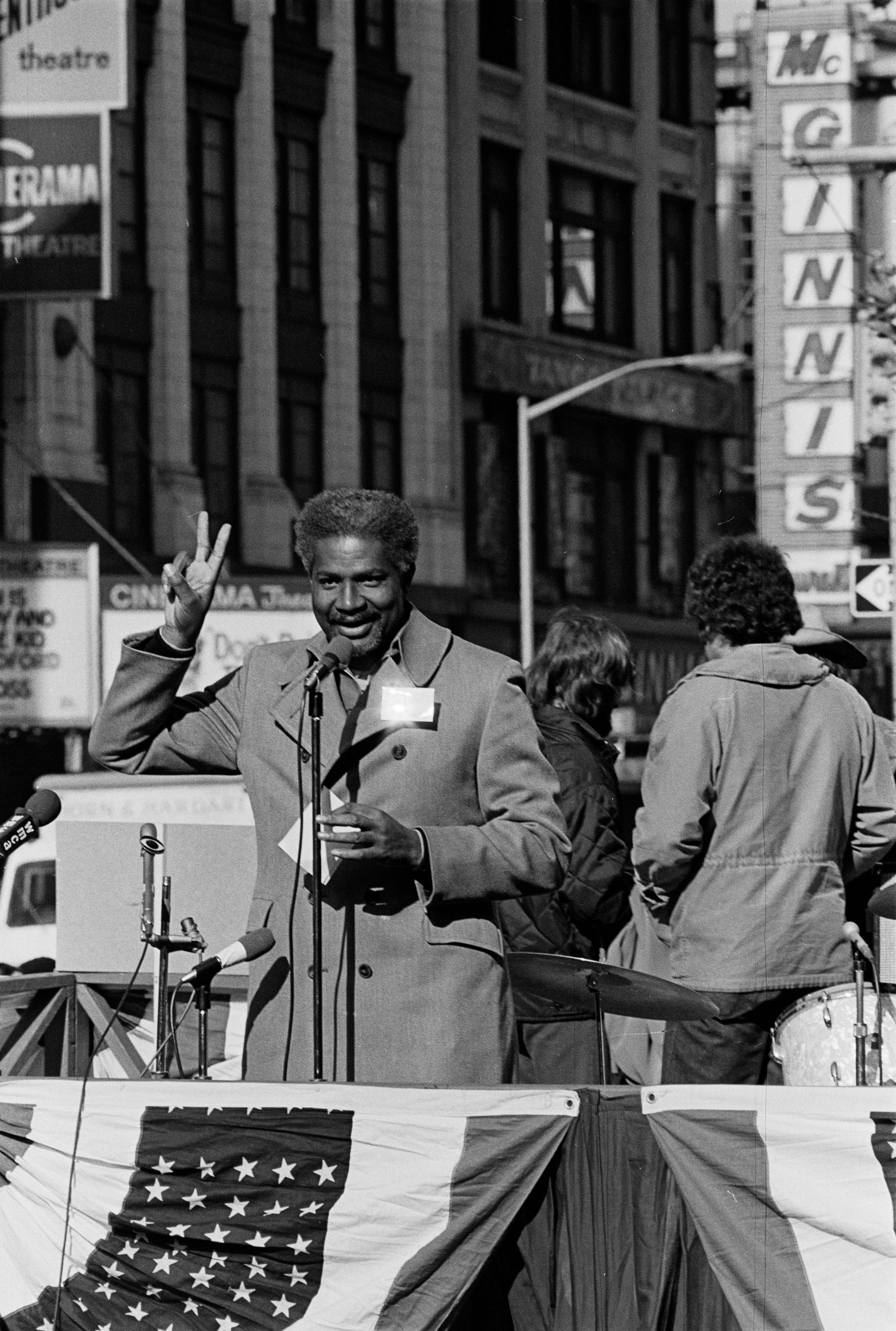
Davis gives a speech at the second Moratorium Day demonstration in New York City, November 14, 1969

Davis and Dee were well known as civil rights activists during the Civil Rights Movement and were close friends of Malcolm X, Jesse Jackson, Martin Luther King Jr. and other icons of the era. They were involved in organizing the 1963 civil rights March on Washington for Jobs and Freedom, and served as its emcees. Davis, alongside Ahmed Osman, delivered the eulogy at the funeral of Malcolm X. He re-read part of this eulogy at the end of Spike Lee's film Malcolm X. He also delivered a stirring tribute to Dr. Martin Luther King Jr, at a memorial in New York's Central Park the day after King was assassinated in Memphis, Tennessee.

=== Death ===
Davis was found dead in a Miami Beach hotel room on February 4, 2005. He was 87 years old. An official cause of death was not released, but he was known to have had heart problems.

Davis's funeral was held in New York City on February 12, 2005. The line to enter The Riverside Church, located on the edge of Harlem, stretched for several blocks, with a thousand or more members of the public unable to attend as the church filled to its 2,100 capacity. Speakers included Davis's children and grandchildren, as well as Alan Alda, Burt Reynolds, Amiri Baraka, Avery Brooks, Angela Bassett, Spike Lee, Attallah Shabazz, Tavis Smiley, Maya Angelou, Sonia Sanchez, Harry Belafonte, and former president Bill Clinton, among many others. Wynton Marsalis performed a musical tribute. Burt Reynolds, who early in his career had worked with Davis, said "Ossie Davis took the bad parts of the South out of me.... I know what a man is because of Ossie Davis." Ms. Shabazz, oldest daughter of Malcolm X and Betty Shabazz, spoke lovingly of the man she and her five sisters called Uncle Ossie, saying he had provided exceptional support to her and her sisters after her father's assassination. Bill Clinton arrived midway through the service, and said from the pulpit "I asked to be seated in the back. I would proudly ride on the back of Ossie Davis's bus any day," adding that Davis "would have made a great president."

Delivering the eulogy, Harry Belafonte said: Ossie Davis "embraced the greatest forces of our times. Paul Robeson, Dr. W.E.B. DuBois, Eleanor Roosevelt, A. Philip Randolph, Fannie Lou Hamer, Ella Baker, Thurgood Marshall, Dr. Martin Luther King Jr., Nelson Mandela, and so many, many more. At the time of one of our most anxious and conflicted moments, when 'Our America' was torn apart by seething issues of race, Ossie paused, at the tomb of one of our noblest warriors, and in the eulogy he delivered, insured that history would clearly understand the voice of Black people, and what Malcolm X meant to us in the African-American struggle for freedom.... It is hard to fathom that we will no longer be able to call on his wisdom, his humor, his loyalty and his moral strength to guide us in the choices that are yet to be made and the battles that are yet to be fought. But how fortunate we were to have him as long as we did." He was cremated at Ferncliff Cemetery. His urn was given to his widow, Ruby, afterwards. Nine years later, Ruby was cremated after her death. Her ashes were placed into the same urn as Ossie.

== Filmography ==
=== Film ===
Year	Title	Role	Notes
1950	No Way Out	John Brooks	Uncredited
1951	Fourteen Hours	Cab Driver	Uncredited
1953	The Joe Louis Story	Bob	Uncredited
1963	Gone Are the Days!	Rev. Purlie Victorious Judson	aka Purlie Victorious
1963	The Cardinal	Father Gillis	
1964	Shock Treatment	Capshaw	
1965	The Hill	Jacko King	
1966	A Man Called Adam	Nelson Davis	
1967	Silent Revolution		
1968	The Scalphunters	Joseph Lee	
1969	Sam Whiskey	Jed Hooker	
1969	Slaves	Luke	
1970	Cotton Comes to Harlem	—N/a	Director
1972	Black Girl	—N/a	Director
1973	Gordon's War	—N/a	Director
1973	Kongi's Harvest	—N/a	Director
1973	Wattstax	Himself	uncredited
1975	Let's Do It Again	Elder Johnson	
1975	Black Shadows on a Silver Screen	Documentary	
1976	Countdown at Kusini	Ernest Motapo	Also director
1979	Hot Stuff	Captain John Geiberger	
1979	Benjamin Banneker: The Man Who Loved the Stars		
1984	Harry & Son	Raymond	
1984	The House of God	Dr. Sanders	
1985	Avenging Angel	Captain Harry Moradian	
1986	From Dreams To Reality: A Tribute to Minority Inventors	Himself	Documentary
1987	Crown Dick	—N/a	Director; Television movie
1988	School Daze	Coach Odom	
1989	Do the Right Thing	Da Mayor	
1990	Joe Versus the Volcano	Marshall	
1991	Preminger: Anatomy of a Filmmaker	Himself	Documentary
1991	Jungle Fever	The Good Reverend Doctor Purify	
1992	Gladiator	Noah	
1992	Malcolm X	Eulogy Performer	Voice
1993	Cop and a Half	Detective in Squad Room	Uncredited
1993	Grumpy Old Men	Chuck	
1994	The Client	Harry Roosevelt	
1996	Get on the Bus	Jeremiah	
1996	I'm Not Rappaport	Midge Carter	
1997	4 Little Girls	Himself	Documentary
1998	Dr. Dolittle	Archer Dolittle	
1998	Alyson's Closet	Postman Extraordinaire	Short film
1999	The Unfinished Journey	Narration	Voice; Documentary short
2000	The Gospel According to Mr. Allen	Narrator	Documentary
2000	Dinosaur	Yar	Voice
2000	Here's to Life!	Duncan Cox	
2001	Voice of the Voiceless	Himself	Documentary
2002	Why Can't We Be a Family Again?	Narrator	Voice; Documentary short
2002	Bubba Ho-Tep	Jack	
2003	Unchained Memories	Reader #6	Documentary
2003	Nat Turner: A Troublesome Property	Himself	Documentary
2003	Beah: A Black Woman Speaks	Himself	Documentary
2003	Baadasssss!	Granddad	
2004	She Hate Me	Judge Buchanan	
2004	Proud	Lorenzo DuFau	
2005	A Trumpet at the Walls of Jericho	Himself	Documentary

=== Television ===
Year	Title	Role	Notes
1955	Kraft Theatre	Brutus Jones	Episode: "The Emperor Jones"
1960	Play of the Week	Will Harris	2 episodes
1960	Playhouse 90	Performer	Episode: "John Brown's Raid"
1961	The Defenders	District Attorney	8 episodes
1962	Seven Times Monday	Will	Television movie
1962	The Catholic Hour	Performer	Episode: "The Sign of Fire"
1962–1963	Car 54, Where Are You?	Officer Omar Anderson	6 episodes
1963	The Great Adventure	John Ross	Episode: "Go Down, Moses"
1964	The Doctors and the Nurses	Dr. Farmer	Episode: "The Family Resemblance"
1964	CBS Show of the Week	Performer	Episode: "Neighbours"
1966	The Fugitive	Lieutenant Johnny Gaines	Episode: "Death is the Door Prize"
1966–1967	Run for Your Life	Performer	3 episodes
1967	12 O'Clock High	Major Glenn Luke	Episode: "The Graveyard"
1968	N.Y.P.D.	Dempsey	2 episodes
1969	Bonanza	Sam Davis	Episode: "The Wish"
1969	The Name of the Game	Kubani	Episode: "The Third Choice"
1969	Night Gallery	Osmund Portifoy	Pilot; Segment: "The Cemetery"
1971	The Sheriff	Sheriff James Lucas	Television movie
1973	Love, American Style	Performer	Episode: "Love and High Spirits"
1974	Hawaii Five-O	Ramon Borelle	Episode: "Hara-Kiri: Murder"
1976	The Tenth Level	Reed	Television movie
1977	Billy: Portrait of a Street Kid	Dr. Fredericks	Television movie
1978	King	Rev. Martin Luther King Sr.	Miniseries
1979	Roots: The Next Generations	Dad Jones	Miniseries
1979	Freedom Road	Narrator	Television movie
1980	All God's Children	Blaine Whitfield	Television movie
1980–1981	Ossie and Ruby!	Co-host	TV Series
1981	Don't Look Back: The Story of Leroy "Satchel" Paige	Chuffy Russell	Television movie
1981	Death of a Prophet	Himself	Television movie
1989	Benjamin Banneker: The Man Who Loved the Stars	Performer	Television movie
1989–1990	B.L. Stryker	'Oz' Jackson	12 episodes
1990	We'll Take Manhattan	Man in Subway	Television movie
1990–1994	Evening Shade	Ponder Blue	99 episodes
1993	Alex Haley's Queen	Parson Dick	Miniseries
1993	The Ernest Green Story	Grandfather	Television movie
1994	The Stand	Judge Richard Farris	Miniseries; 4 episodes
1995	Ray Alexander	Uncle Phil	Television movie
1995	The Android Affair	Dr. Winston	Television movie
1995–1996	The Client	Judge Harry Roosevelt	14 episodes
1996	Home of the Brave	Erasmus Jones	Television movie
1996–1998	Promised Land	Erasmus Jones	10 episodes
1996–2002	Touched by an Angel	Erasmus Jones / Gabriel / Gabe	6 episodes
1997	Miss Evers' Boys	Mr. Evers	Television movie
1997	12 Angry Men	Juror #2	Television movie
1999	Cosby	Fred	Episode: "Ol' Betsy"
1999	The Secret Path	'Too Tall'	Television movie
1999	The Soul Collector	Mordecai	Television movie
1999	The Ghosts of Christmas Eve	The Caretaker	Television movie
1999	A Vow to Cherish	Alexander Billman	Television movie
1999–2000	Third Watch	Mr. Parker	3 episodes
2001	Between the Lions	Woodcutter	Episode: Bug Beard
2000	Finding Buck McHenry	Buck McHenry	Television movie
2001	Legend of the Candy Cane	Julius	Voice; Television movie
2001	The Feast of All Saints	Jean-Jacques	Television movie
2002	Persidio Med	Otis Clayton	Episode: "This Baby's Gonna Fly"
2003	Deacons for Defense	Reverend Gregory	Television movie
2003	JAG	Terrence Minnerly	Episode: "Close Quarters"
2004–2005	The L Word	Melvin Porter	Final appearance; 4 episodes

=== Theatre ===
Year	Title	Role	Notes
1939	Joy Exceeding Glory	Reverend Stokes	Rose McClendon Players
1940	On Strivers Row	Chuck Reynolds	Rose McClendon Players
1940	Booker T. Washington	Fred	Rose McClendon Players
1941	Black Women in White	Performer	Rose McClendon Players
1946	Jeb	Jeb Turner	Martin Beck Theatre, Broadway
1946	Anna Lucasta	Rudolph	Mansfield Touring Company
1948	The Leading Lady	Trem	National Theatre, Broadway
1949	The Smile of the World	Stewart	Lyceum Theatre, Broadway
1949	Stevedore	Lonnie Thompson	Equity Library Theatre
1950	The Wisteria Trees	Jacques	Martin Beck Theatre, Broadway
1951	The Royal Family	Jo	City Center, Broadway
1951	The Green Pastures	Gabriel	Broadway Theatre, Broadway
1951	Remains to Be Seen	Al	Morosco Theatre, Broadway
1953	Touchstone	Dr. Joseph Clay	Music Box Theatre, Broadway
1955	The Wisteria Trees	Jacques	City Center, Broadway
1956	No Time for Sergeants	A Lieutenant	Alvin Theatre
1957	Jamaica	Cicero	Imperial Theatre, Broadway
1959	A Raisin in the Sun	Walter Lee Younger (replacement)	Ethel Barrymore Theatre, Broadway
1961	Purlie Victorious	Purlie Victorious / Also writer	Cort Theatre, Broadway
1963	Ballad for Bimshire	Sir Radio	Mayfair Theatre
1865	The Zulu and the Zayda	Johannes	Cort Theatre
1972	Ain't Supposed to Die a Natural Death	Performer	Ethel Barrymore Theatre
1979	Take It from the Top	The Lord / Also director	New Federal Theatre
1983	Zora Is My Name!	Performer	American Playhouse
1986	I'm Not Rappaport	Midge (replacement)	Booth Theatre, Broadway
1988	A Celebration of Paul Robeson	Performer	Shubert Theatre, Broadway
1995	Two Hah Hahs and a Homeboy	Performer	Crossroads Theatre Company

== Discography ==
- Autobiography of Frederick Douglass, Vol. 1: (Folkways Records, 1966)
- Autobiography of Frederick Douglass, Vol. 2: (Folkways, 1966)
- Frederick Douglass' The Meaning of July 4 for the Negro: (Folkways, 1975)
- Frederick Douglass' Speeches inc. The Dred Scott Decision: (Folkways, 1976)

== Awards and honors ==
In 1989, Ossie Davis and his wife, actress/activist Ruby Dee, were named to the NAACP Image Awards Hall of Fame. In 1995, they were awarded the National Medal of Arts, the nation's highest honor conferred to an individual artist on behalf of the country and presented in a White House ceremony by the President of the United States. In 1994, Davis was inducted into the American Theater Hall of Fame. In 2004, they were recipients of the prestigious Kennedy Center Honors. According to the Kennedy Center Honors:

"The Honors recipients recognized for their lifetime contributions to American culture through the performing arts— whether in dance, music, theater, opera, motion pictures, or television — are selected by the Center's Board of Trustees. The primary criterion in the selection process is excellence. The Honors are not designated by art form or category of artistic achievement; the selection process, over the years, has produced balance among the various arts and artistic disciplines."

Year	Association	Category	Project	Result	Ref.
1958	Tony Awards	Best Featured Actor in a Musical	Jamaica	Nominated	
1968	Golden Globe Awards	Best Supporting Actor	The Scalphunters	Nominated	
1969	Primetime Emmy Awards	Outstanding Single Performance by an Actor in a Leading Role	Hallmark Hall of Fame: "Teacher, Teacher"	Nominated	
1978	Primetime Emmy Awards	Outstanding Performance by a Supporting Actor in a Drama Series	King	Nominated	
1979	Coretta Scott King Award	Author	Escape to Freedom	Won	
1984	Writers Guild of America Awards	Adapted Drama Anthology	For Us the Living: The Medgar Evers Story	Won	
1989	NAACP Image Awards	Outstanding Supporting Actor in a Motion Picture	Do the Right Thing	Won	
1997	Primetime Emmy Awards	Outstanding Supporting Actor in a Miniseries or a Special	Miss Evers' Boys	Nominated	
2001	Daytime Emmy Awards	Outstanding Performer in a Children's Special	Finding Buck McHenry	Won	
2001	Grammy Awards	Best Spoken Word	The Complete Shakespeare Sonnets	Nominated	
2005	Primetime Emmy Awards	Outstanding Guest Actor in a Drama Series	The L Word	Nominated	
2007	Grammy Awards	Best Spoken Word	With Ossie and Ruby: In This Life Together	Won	

== Bibliography ==
- Davis, Ossie (1961). Purlie Victorious. New York: Samuel French Inc. Plays. ISBN 978-0-573-61435-4.
- Davis, Ossie (1977). Escape to Freedom: The Story of Young Frederick Douglass. New York: Samuel French. ISBN 978-0-573-65031-4.
- Davis, Ossie (1982). Langston. New York: Delacorte Press. ISBN 978-0-440-04634-9.
- Davis, Ossie; Dee, Ruby (1984). Why Mosquitos Buzz in People's Ears (Audio). Caedmon. ISBN 978-0-694-51187-7.
- Davis, Ossie (1992). Just Like Martin. New York: Simon & Schuster Children's Publishing. ISBN 978-0-671-73202-8.
- Davis, Ossie; Dee, Ruby (1998). With Ossie and Ruby: In This Life Together. New York: William Morrow. ISBN 978-0-688-15396-0.
- Davis, Ossie (2006). Dee, Ruby (ed.). Life Lit by Some Large Vision: Selected Speeches and Writings. New York: Simon and Schuster. ISBN 978-1-416-52549-3.

== See also ==
- List of people from Harlem
