= Elizabeth Ann Brown =

American foreign service officer

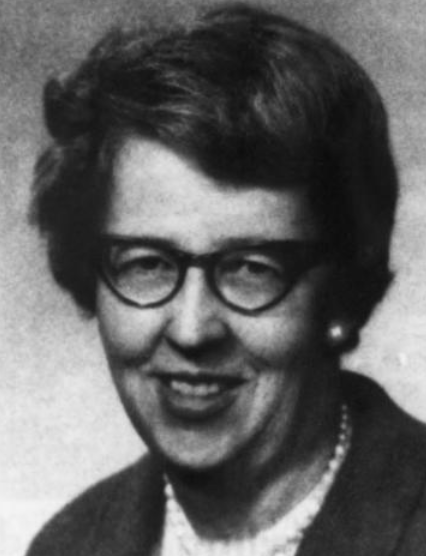
- Brown, from a 1967 publication of the US Department of State
- Born: August 15, 1918; Portland, Oregon
- Died: March 7, 2017 (aged 98); Washington, D.C.
- Occupation: Foreign service officer

Elizabeth Ann Brown (August 15, 1918 – March 7, 2017) was an American foreign service officer. She was appointed Director of the Office of United Nations Political Affairs in 1965, and won the Federal Woman's Award in 1967.

== Early life and education ==
Elizabeth Ann Brown was born in Portland, Oregon, the daughter of Edwin Keith Brown and Grace Viola Foss Brown. She earned a bachelor's degree in political science from Reed College in 1940, with a senior thesis titled "A Study of Isolationist Propaganda". She earned a master's degree in international relations and government from Columbia University in 1943.

== Career ==
During World War II, Brown worked for the National War Labor Board. After the war, she joined the State Department, where she was a foreign affairs analyst and officer. In 1956 she became acting Officer in Charge of the Office of United Nations Political Affairs. From 1960 to 1963, she worked at the American Embassy in Bonn. She was named Director of the Office of United Nations Political Affairs in 1965, and won the Federal Woman's Award in 1967, "for her unique accomplishments in the precedent-building field of multilateral diplomacy". In 1968, she was a keynote speaker at the Model United Nations of the Far West, held at the University of Arizona.

From 1970 to 1975, Brown was Political Counselor at the Embassy of the United States in Athens. She was Deputy Chief of Mission at The Hague in 1975. She spent the last years of her career working in Washington, D.C., and retired in 1979.

Brown wrote a college history, The Formative Years of Reed College (1947), served on the National Advisory Council of Reed College, and won the school's Distinguished Service Award in 1992.

== Personal life and legacy ==
Brown gave an oral history interview to the Association for Diplomatic Studies and Training in 1995. She died in 2017, aged 98 years, in Washington, D.C.
