= Marilyn Levy =

American chemist

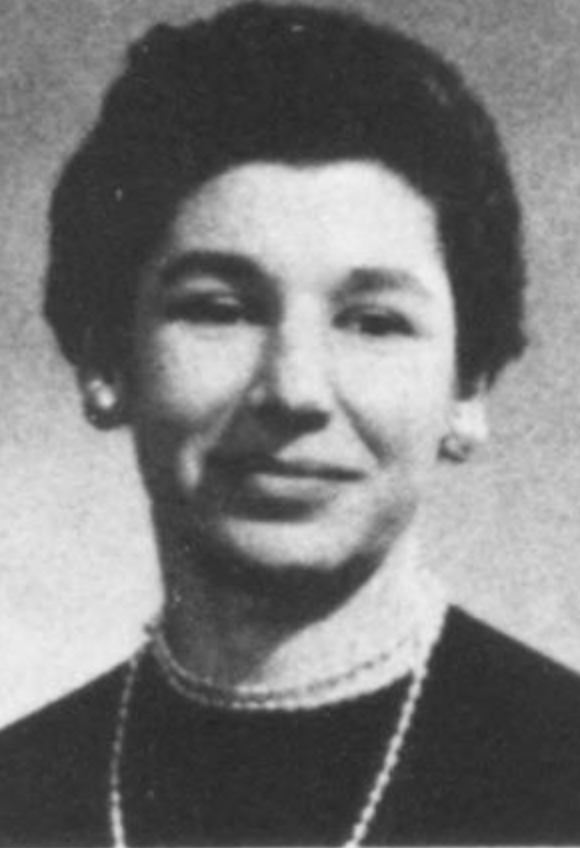
- Marilyn Levy, from a 1962 publication of the United States federal government
- Born: April 3, 1922; New York City
- Died: June 19, 2014 (aged 92); Red Bank, New Jersey
- Occupations: Chemist, inventor
- Known for: Photographic research for United States Army
- Honours: Meritorious Civilian Service Award (1971), Army Research and Development Achievement Award (1973)

Marilyn Levy (April 3, 1922 – June 19, 2014) was an American chemist and inventor based at Fort Monmouth. She was awarded the United States Army's Meritorious Civilian Service Award in 1971.

== Early life ==
Marilyn Levy was born in New York City, the daughter of Moses (Morris) Levy and Rachel (Rae) Levy. Both of her parents were Jewish and also born in New York. She attended Hunter College High School and Hunter College, completing a bachelor's degree in chemistry in 1942. She pursued graduate studies in chemistry at the Polytechnic Institute of Brooklyn.

== Career ==
Beginning in 1953, Levy worked as a chemist at Fort Monmouth, where she "received international acclaim as a pioneer and as an expert in photographic research". She held more than twenty patents on film developing processes. She was head of the Photo Optics Technical Area (POTA), Combat Surveillance and Target Acquisition Laboratory, and the first woman in the United States Army Electronics Command (ECOM) to reach grade GS-15. She retired in 1979.

In 1971, Levy received the Army's Meritorious Civilian Service Award. In 1973, she received the Army Research and Development Achievement Award. She was nominated twice for the Federal Woman's Award, but did not receive that honor. She was a member of the Royal Photographic Society, the American Chemical Society, and Society of Photographic Scientists and Engineers. She served on the editorial board of the Journal of Applied Photographic Engineering and Photographic Science and Engineering.

== Patents ==
Marilyn Levy patented several photographic processes, methods, and materials during her work for the American military, including:

- Photothermographic substance (1956), with Heinz Schulze
- Sensitizer for photothermographic substances (1956)
- Monobaths containing sodium polyacrylate and polyvinyl-pyrrolidone (1965)
- Viscous processing solution (1966)
- Photographic processing apparatus (1966), with Seymour L. Hersh
- Image forming material and method of forming an image therefrom (1971)
- Color printing method (1972)
- Curve analysis method in color photography (1976)
- Filter pack correction method in color photography (1979), with Milan Schwartz
- Reconnaissance/surveillance system utilizing color signature of target (granted 1979), with Vincent W. Ball
- Method and apparatus for manufacturing masked motion picture film for simulated target practice (1981), with Seymour L. Hersh

== Personal life ==
A longtime resident of Little Silver, New Jersey, Levy died in 2014, aged 92 years, in Red Bank, New Jersey.
