= Frances L. Whedon =

American scientist (1902–1998)

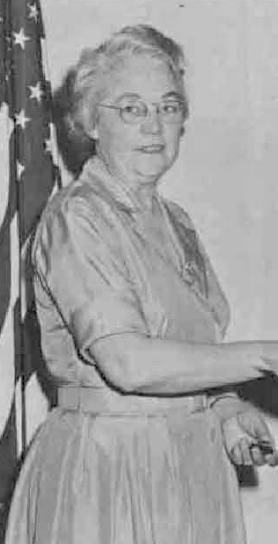
- Frances L. Whedon, from a 1960 publication of the United States Army
- Born: Frances Louisa Bliven; August 27, 1902; Provincetown, Massachusetts
- Died: December 15, 1998 (aged 96); Fairfax, Virginia
- Occupations: Staff meteorologist, Army Research Office

Frances Louisa Bliven Whedon (August 27, 1902 – December 15, 1998) was an American meteorologist with the United States Army from 1942 to 1971, first as chief of the Signal Corps's meteorological section, and later as staff meteorologist at the Army Research Office. She twice received the Meritorious Civilian Service Award (in 1946 and 1962), and once the Exceptional Civilian Service Award (in 1971).

== Early life ==
Frances L. Bliven was born in Provincetown, Massachusetts, the daughter of Charles Francis Bliven and Frances Eleanor Cates Bliven. Her father was a dentist. She earned a bachelor's degree in physics from the Massachusetts Institute of Technology in 1924.

== Career ==
Whedon was a prominent civilian woman in the United States Army's weather services, first as chief of the meteorological section of the Signal Corps from 1947 to 1959, and later as staff meteorologist at the Army Research Office from 1959 to her retirement in 1971. She served as the Army's representative on teams overseeing the use of high-altitude balloons, small rockets, and satellites for atmospheric research. She was also involved in International Geophysical Year programs, and in Project Cirrus, a joint military effort to create weather modification technologies to facilitate tactical operations. "Women scientists have demonstrated they can be equally competent, if well trained, when given equal opportunities", she said in a 1960 publication. She received the Meritorious Civilian Service Award in 1946 and 1962.

In 1958 Whedon was appointed to the American Meteorological Society's Committee for the Encouragement of Meteorological Research. In 1961, she spoke at a Paris conference on exterior ballistics in 1961, and chaired a session at the Conference on the Status of Meteorological Rocketry in Texas. In 1962, she attended the international Conference for the Planning of Research in Tropical Meteorology, held in New Jersey, and chaired a session at the Fourth Conference on Applied Meteorology in Virginia. She was the Army's point of contact for activities surrounding the 1970 total solar eclipse. In 1971, she received the Exceptional Civilian Service Award, and was nominated for the Federal Woman's Award.

Fellow MIT physics alumna and engineer Virginia Tower Norwood recalled Whedon's assistance with access to wind and temperature data: "She had been absolutely brusque with the men, but she took a shine to me."

== Selected publications ==
- "The Role of Micrometeorology in the Army" (1965)
- "Small-Scale Atmospheric Modification" (1972, with David A. Lawson)

== Personal life ==
Bliven was married to William Edward Whedon; they had a daughter, and later divorced. Whedon died in 1998, aged 96 years, at a hospital in Fairfax, Virginia.
