= William Conan Davis =

American food chemist (1926–2022)

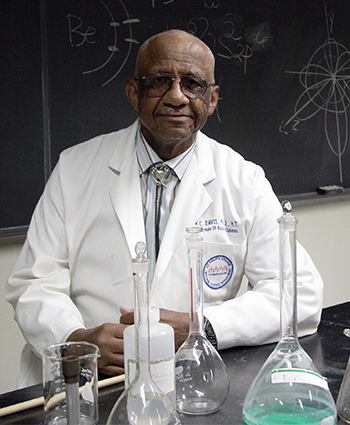
- Born: August 22, 1926; Waycross, Georgia, U.S.
- Died: March 16, 2022 (aged 95)
- Other name: William C. Davis
- Education: Talladega College; Tuskegee Institute; University of Idaho
- Spouse: Ocia Davis (died)
- Scientific career
- Fields: Food chemistry
- Workplaces: St. Philip's College
- Doctoral advisor: Duane Le Tourneau

External videos
- Science Makers: William Davis, The History Makers
- Did you know that San Antonio has ties to the invention of a Thanksgiving favorite?, San Antonio Live
- Science Career Treasured Memories, African American Registry

William Conan Davis (August 22, 1926 – March 16, 2022) was a professor emeritus and was chair of natural sciences at St. Philip's College in San Antonio, Texas. The William C. Davis Science Building is named in his honor.

He is best known for his research in food chemistry. He discovered arabinogalactan and used it to create instant mashed potatoes. His discoveries also improved potato chips and soft serve ice cream. He developed an organic glue for use in particle board. More recently, he co-developed the formula for Dasani water.

In addition to his scientific work, he was a Lutheran lay minister, served during the Korean War, and received the Purple Heart. Furthermore, Davis was a commissioned officer in the U.S. Army Corps of Engineers.

== Education ==
William Conan Davis was born on August 22, 1926, in Waycross, Georgia to Kince Charles Davis and his wife Laura Jane (née Cooper; July 9, 1898 – June 6, 2004). Kince Davis' family self-identified as being of Ethiopian Jewish descent, and he read Hebrew but not English. Kince Davis was employed as a railway construction engineer and crew boss, a position that brought him threats from the Ku Klux Klan. He later started a herbal medicine business, the only source of medical care accessible to many black people in Georgia. William Davis spent time during the summers with his maternal grandfather Jonnas Franklin, who identified as a Sioux Indian and who farmed and hunted near the Okefenokee Swamp.

William Davis attended Magnolia Grammar School and Dasher High School in Valdosta, Georgia. He received a high school diploma from Dasher in 1944. His family was active in civil rights and supportive of their children's education. On one occasion Kince Davis drove his sons William and Kenneth to Tuskegee Institute (a distance of 300 miles in a Tin Lizzie) to attend a workshop with George Washington Carver and Henry Ford. This experience fueled William's interest in becoming a chemist.

Dasher High School did not teach at a college preparatory level, leaving William at a disadvantage in science and mathematics. To prepare him for college, William's family sent him to New York City in 1944. He lived with his older brother, actor and civil rights activist Ossie Davis. He attended Dwight High School, taking preparatory classes in science and graduating in 1945. William Davis briefly attended the City College of New York, but was advised to transfer to Talladega College in Alabama where he could get more individual support in calculus.

Davis was enrolled in the U.S. Army Reserve Officers' Training Corps. During his first year at Talladega, he was drafted to serve in the Korean War. He was commissioned as a Second Lieutenant in the U.S. Army Corps of Engineers. He served in Germany and was awarded a Purple Heart in 1953.

On his return, Davis completed his B.S. degree in chemistry at Talladega College, graduating in 1956. He was one of three students chosen for a George Washington Carver research fellowship to attend Tuskegee Institute in 1956. At the time, it was almost impossible for a black scientist to train for a professional career in research in the United States. Even at Tuskegee, the usual career track was to train as a teacher, with a specialization in one's area of interest. Davis was determined to do research. He worked with Clarence T. Mason of Tuskegee and studied the hydrolysis rate of compounds in jet fuel. This research enabled him to meet Wernher von Braun of the U.S. Space & Rocket Center. Davis received his Master of Science degree in organic chemistry from Tuskegee in 1958.

== Doctoral research ==
It was extremely difficult for a black student to find support for a Ph.D. program in research. The University of Idaho was the only university willing to accept Davis as a research-track graduate student. Davis and his wife Ocia moved to Moscow, Idaho. Perhaps not surprisingly, given this location, his thesis research involved potatoes. Davis studied the process of sloughing, by which plant materials break down. This has important applications in food chemistry. Soup manufacturers want potatoes that tend to stay firm, not sloughing. Makers of mashed potatoes want potato flakes to break down rapidly and reform with a uniform, soft consistency.

Meanwhile, the Industrial Research department at nearby Washington State University advertised for summer researchers to study the buildup of particles on saw blades in lumber mills. Davis applied and was able to identify the source of the problem. He isolated and extracted a dry, crystal-like powder, arabinogalactan, that produced a sticky paste when water was added to it. This water-soluble polysaccharide is found in Western Larch trees (Larix occidentalis) and other plants and is believed to have health benefits. At the time, no one had any idea of how to make use of the substance Davis had identified.

Back at the University of Idaho, Davis studied potato chips and what caused them to blister when fried. He was able to isolate the substance that caused the blistering, but when it was removed from the potatoes they disintegrated. Frustrated by the apparent stalemate in both lines of research, Davis tried adding arabinogalactans to his potato mixtures. The water was absorbed, and the potatoes fluffed up. Davis' approach improved the sloughing properties of the potatoes and created instant mashed potatoes with a more desirable texture and consistency.

While completing his doctorate, Davis worked with scientists at Washington State University in a variety of fields, including clinical research with Mark Adams. Davis did further research into the extraction of arabinogalactan from larch trees. He identified a sugar that makes frozen desserts smoother and is used to make soft-serve ice cream. He also helped to discover a wood sugar that is used in industrial glue to make compressed wood. These discoveries were not patented, and most were further developed by others.

Davis received his Ph.D. in biochemistry from the University of Idaho in 1965. His Ph.D. thesis was A Study of Sloughing in the Potato Tuber (1965). He was the first African-American to receive a Ph.D. from the University of Idaho.

== Further career ==
After graduation, Davis accepted a position as a researcher with the Division of Industrial Research at Washington State University, researching antigens for hay fever.

Davis worked as a post-doctoral fellow with Rosalyn Yalow at the Bronx Veteran's Affairs Hospital, where he learned radioimmunoassay techniques for use with diabetic patients. Using his knowledge of radioimmunoassay techniques Davis developed standardized tests for the detection of thyroxin in the blood stream. He also developed standardized blood tests for insulin and growth hormones.

Davis was recruited as a health physicist and became head of the radioactivity department at United Medical Laboratories in Portland, Oregon. Following certification as a medial technologist, Davis became director of the laboratory. He spent nearly fifteen years as Director of United Medical Laboratories.

[At United Medical Laboratories] we provided analyses for doctors all over the world, and devised methods for reducing the time and cost of conducting clinical assays to develop detect concentrations of hormones and steroids in the blood such as aldosterone, estrogen, and testosterone ... We made exotic procedures routine and brought their price down. Using autoanalyzers when they had just come out, we could perform tests more quickly than they could be done locally.

Concerned about the lack of medical facilities available to African Americans in the Portland area, Davis worked with Kent Ford of the Portland Black Panther Party and others to establish the Fred Hampton Memorial Clinic in 1970. The clinic offered free medical services to both blacks and whites in the Albina neighborhood. Davis was one of the few black professionals to volunteer at the clinic: its doctors were predominantly white. He was strongly involved in its sickle-cell anemia initiatives. The clinic emphasized screening, education and counseling about the genetic disorder which disproportionately affects African Americans. In 1972, Davis helped put on the Black Community Survival Conference, a protest against the expansion of the Emanuel Hospital. The expansion was planned without community input and largely destroyed the commercial center of a historically black neighborhood.

From 1974 to 1975, Davis was a visiting scientist at the George Hyman Research Institute in Washington, D.C. From 1979 to 1982, Davis was a research associate in Molecular Pharmacology at the University of Texas Health Science Center in San Antonio, Texas. He worked with Maharaj K. Ticku to study the effects of picrotoxin, benzodiazepines, pentobarbital, ethanol, and other psychoactive substances on receptor binding sites.

In 1983, Davis was hired as an instructor in the chemistry department at St. Philip's College, giving him more opportunity for teaching as well as research. He became a full professor of chemistry in 1995. He became the chair of the Natural Sciences Department in 1996. He was also the director of Renewable Energy at St. Philip's College.

I tell my students to be curious about everything — and ask, 'How can I improve this? How can I be of service?'

— William C. Davis

While at St. Philip's College, one of Davis' focuses of study was water. Davis worked with United Beverage company to study the behavioral properties of Penta Water, which he nicknamed "kinetic water". The company promoted their product as having uniquely distinct chemical properties due to its purification process. Davis studied characteristics such as boiling point, pH, polarity and surface tension. With Lanier Byrd, Davis co-created the formula that gives a characteristic taste to Dasani water, a product of The Coca-Cola Company. In addition to hydrology, Davis was interested in recombinant DNA and fuel cell technologies for renewable energy.

Davis retired in 2009, becoming a professor emeritus of St. Philip's College. At that time, it was decided to rename the natural sciences building in his honor to acknowledge his contributions. Funds were raised to renovate the building, and it was reopened and dedicated as the William C. Davis Science Building in 2012. A portrait of William Davis, commissioned from Howard Rhoder, hangs in the science building. Davis awarded the St. Phillips College $20,000 towards science and STEM scholarships to the school.

'Observe!' I have instructed my students to do thousands of times. We can take two or more existing things, analyze them for what they are, and then synthesize something entirely new that did not exist before. This is the heartbeat of scientific research and discovery.

— William Conan Davis

Davis was also active in preserving the history of science. He helped to establish the Ernest Stevenson Collection of scientific books and artifacts, to be housed at the Sutton Learning Center at St. Philip's College. Before his death, he was working on his memoirs with the support of historian Jeanette Nyda Mendelssohn Passty.

== Awards ==
- 1953, Purple Heart Medal, U.S. Armed Forces
- 1956, George Washington Carver Fellowship, Tuskegee Institute
- 2000, Texas Hall of Fame; one of 16 charter members
- 2010, Honorary associate degree, St. Philip's College
- 2020, Genius Award, Liberty Science Center

== Memberships ==
- American Chemical Society
- Health Physics Society
- Society of Nuclear Medicine
- American Association for the Advancement of Science
