= Evans Hayward =

American physicist (1922–2020)

- Born: February 17, 1922
- Died: March 2, 2020 (aged 98)
- Education: University of California
- Occupation: Physicist

Evans Hayward (February 17, 1922 – March 2, 2020) was an American physicist and a Fellow of the American Physical Society. She was an international leader in photonuclear physics using beams of electrons, positrons and neutrons from high-energy accelerators to probe nuclear structure.

Over a period of over 5 decades her research interests included precision measurements of photo-neutron production cross sections; studies of the scattering and absorption of photons by deformed nuclei; the study of the nuclear photo-effect in oriented nuclei; and measurements of electron spectra and (e,p) and (e,α) reactions.

== Early life and education ==
Evans was born February 17, 1922, in Camp Dix, New Jersey. She graduated in 1942 from Smith College with a B.A. in physics, magna cum laude, and from University of California, Berkeley with a PhD. Her graduate studies were at the University of California, where she received an M.S. in 1945 and Ph.D. in 1947.

From 1950 to 1990, she worked at the National Institute of Standards and Technology.

She won a Guggenheim Fellowship. Measurements of photoatomic cross-sections and magnetic resonances were among her contribution to physics.

== Career ==
Evans' thesis research was on the ionization produced by high-energy cosmic-ray electrons with a cloud chamber in order to determine whether the probable ionization produced by a high velocity particle continues to rise logarithmically with energy. She did postgraduate work at the Radiation Laboratory at the University of California at Berkeley from 1947- 1950, that included cloud-chamber studies of synchrotron produced electrons and cyclotron produced mesons. She also made measurements of the angular distribution of protons scattered by neutrons in the neutron beam from the Berkeley cyclotron, again using a cloud chamber. The results showed that the scattering is not isotropic in the center of mass system and that it is not symmetric about 90 degrees. The peak of protons in the forward direction indicated that a certain amount of charge exchange is taking place between the neutron and proton. Continuing her work with neutrons, she measured the energy spectrum of delayed neutrons from 17O leading to information on the excited states of 17O.

At Berkeley she met her future husband Raymond Hayward and in 1950 they were both recruited to the National Bureau of Standards (NBS). Her initial experimental work at NBS was with gamma rays from a 60Co source and a 50 MeV betatron. When NBS moved from Washington DC to Gaithersburg, MD and the 150 MeV linac became available, she could do more difficult experiments since the electron beam current was much more intense. One of her first collaborations at NBS was with John Hubbell. They made measurements to determine the albedo of 1-MeV photons reflected from semi-infinite slabs of water, aluminum, copper, tin, and lead at various angles of incidence. They then did Monte Carlo calculations using a desk calculator that confirmed the experimental results.

Evans then worked with William Dodge on linac experiments to test theories for bremsstrahlung, of real and virtual photon interactions with nuclei, and of elastic scattering of photons. Particularly elegant was the theory of Arenhoevel and Hayward on scattering of plane-polarized photons by the giant resonances of nuclei. The equally elegant experimental application of this theory was described in an article by Hayward, Barber, and Sazama in which “a beam of plane-polarized monochromatic photons” from a carbon target in a linac bremsstrahlung beam was “produced by the resonance fluorescence of the well-known 1+ state at 15.1 MeV in 12C. These photons were scattered a second time from natural targets of Cd, Sn, Ta, W, Pt, Au, and Bi”. This was indeed a brute force method of avoiding the problem caused by x ray sources with broad energy spectra in order to study nuclear phenomena at a single gamma-ray energy, in this case 15.1 MeV. Evans and her friend the theorist Mike Danos shared an office at NBS for decades. As they became senior staff they were more than once offered separate offices but they refused. This was explained as being really useful for a theorist to have daily contact with an experimentalist and hear what was going on in that field, and vice versa. One group of photonuclear experiments she did showed that the "giant resonance" in ellipsoidal nuclei peaked at two different energies, corresponding to the major and minor axes of the ellipsoid, and the relative strengths of the two peaks depended on whether the ellipsoid was oblate or prolate, all as predicted by Mike Danos.

Her colleague Everett Fuller was the world authority on the bibliography of photonuclear reactions. When Fuller retired, Evans continued that work and made it possible for the library to be available at a number of laboratories. Now it is available at the Moscow State University Institute of Nuclear Physics Centre for Photonuclear Experiments Data, the National Nuclear Data Center at Brookhaven National Laboratory and the IAEA Nuclear Data Section in Vienna, Austria. Those data formed the basis of a digital database "Photonuclear Data Index." In addition to the work on the photonuclear reactions bibliography, she made a number of measurements of photonuclear cross sections to contribute to the database. Her collaboration with Wolynec, Martins and Dodge for photo- and electronuclear reactions led to publications that are well-known throughout the world. Evans retired from NBS/NIST in 1990 but maintained collaborations with many scientists at NBS/NIST and throughout the world. She remarked that she always wore attire so as to have a professional appearance and not cause distraction during the experiments. Evans was a woman physicist at a time when very few physicists were women. She knew she had to excel in her field in order to be recognized for her work and she did. She suffered some level of gender discrimination at various times even at NBS. But her peers and direct supervisors recognized her extraordinary accomplishments and the value she brought to NBS. She was a natural leader and was selected as Group Leader for the Nuclear Research Group in 1975. She also served as Deputy Chief of the Nuclear Radiation Division 1978 -1980. She travelled widely to participate in experiments at high-energy accelerators and to lecture at academic institutions.

She was a Guggenheim Fellow at the Institute for Theoretical Physics in Copenhagen 1961 -1962; a guest professor at the Institute for Nuclear Physics Goethe University 1966; Sir Thomas Lyle Fellow University of Melbourne 1969; a visiting professor of physics University of Toronto 1975; a guest professor of experimental physics Max Planck Institute, Mainz 1982 -1986; a senior visiting scientist at the Nuclear Physics Laboratory Oxford 1985 -1986;a visiting professor of physics at Duke University 1987; a visiting scientist at the Physics Institute University of Lund 1987. She became an adjunct professor of physics at Duke University in 1990.

In addition to these professional activities, she found herself becoming a “committee person” in the 1970s. She was selected by President Richard Nixon to serve on the General Advisory Committee to the Atomic Energy Commission. She was a member of the Advisory Screening Committee in Physics for the Committee on International Exchange of persons (Senior Fulbright-Hays Program). In that capacity she reviewed applications for Fulbright Scholarships in the field of physics. She was also a member of Maryland Governor Mandel’s Science Advisory Council, which assists the governor with scientific problems and forecasts of future scientific information and their relation to the state of Maryland. Evans received the Department of Commerce Silver Medal in 1958. She received their Gold Medal in 1971. She was a recipient of the Federal Women’s Award in 1975 and the NBS Samuel Wesley Stratton Award in 1980. Evans was selected as an NBS Fellow 1987 and in 1995 was selected to the NIST Portrait Gallery of Distinguished Scientists, Engineers and Administrators. She was a Fellow of the American Physical Society.

After she was fully retired, she started taking evening classes at American University in areas such as politics and international relations, Spanish and Italian. When asked why she was taking them she said she still wants to learn. Evans was predeceased by her husband Ray and two sons. Her colleagues from around the world have expressed their condolences and their appreciation for the support and encouragement Evans offered for their research.

== Death ==
Evans Hayward died March 2, 2020, in Chevy Chase, Maryland, from heart disease.
