= Esther Christian Lawton =

Civil servant and women's rights activist (1910–1998)

- Born: 1910
- Died: 1998 (aged 88)

Esther Christian Lawton (1910–1998) was an American personnel manager and administrator. Lawton occupied a number of public and private sector positions during her lifetime, most notably becoming the Deputy Director of Personnel for the United States Treasury Department and the first female foreign consultant of the Ford Foundation.

== Biography ==
Lawton was born in Brooklyn, New York in 1910. She pursued a career in civil service, graduating from the University of Rochester in 1932. In 1936 she began working for the Treasury Department as a personnel and public relations manager, while also working with the Treasury Department's wing of the newly-formed Office of Strategic Services. In 1942 she switched her role in the government to that of a position classifier, an act which further her career as a specialized personnel manager. In 1972 she was appointed Deputy Director of Personnel for the Treasury Department. She also began coordinating her efforts with the Ford Foundation, and served as a consultant for the governments of Lebanon and Jordan.

Lawton retired in 1980. In her retirement, she taught at George Washington University's School of Government and Business Administration. She died in 1998 at the age of 88.
