= Jocelyn Gill =

American astronomer

Jocelyn R. Gill
- Born: 1916; Arizona
- Died: April 26, 1984 (aged 67–68); Cincinnati, Ohio
- Education: Wellesley College University of Chicago Yale University
- Scientific career
- Workplaces: NASA

Jocelyn Gill (1916–April 26, 1984) was an American astronomer who worked for NASA.

== Biography ==
Jocelyn R. Gill graduated from Wellesley College in 1938. She worked at Mount Holyoke College as a laboratory assistant and instructor of astronomy, before being hired at the Massachusetts Institute of Technology and receiving her PhD at Yale University in 1959. Gill was an instructor and assistant professor at Smith College from 1945 to 1952, an associate professor of mathematics and astronomy at Arizona State University from 1959 to 1960, and an astronomy research assistant at Yale University. Gill joined NASA in 1961 where she worked on the crewed space program, carried out research, held the position of chief of in-flight science from 1963 to 1966, and worked on Project Gemini. She participated in a solar eclipse flight in July 1963 on which she observed the Sun's corona and aimed to teach the astronauts travelling with her about astronomy; a field they were not otherwise required to be knowledgeable in. Gill researched celestial mechanics, numerical analysis of satellite orbits, and the motion of Triton.

Gill was a fellow of the American Association for the Advancement of Science and received the Federal Women's Award in 1966. Gill was diagnosed with multiple sclerosis and in 1966 received an award from the National Multiple Sclerosis Society for being their woman of the year. She died of the disease in April 1984 at the age of 67.
