= Rita Rapp =

American physiologist

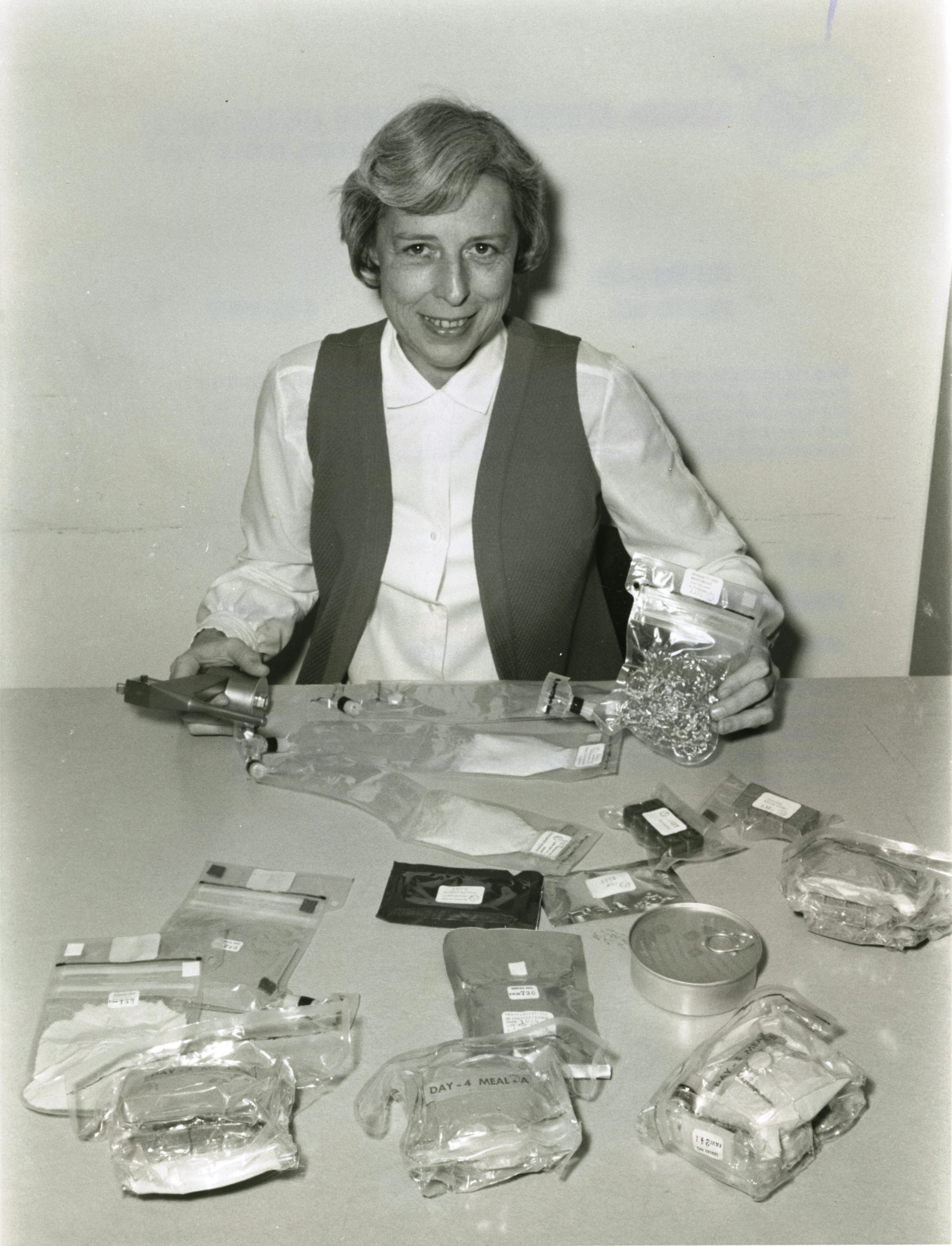
- Rita Rapp displays the range of food containers used on the Apollo 16 mission
- Born: Rita M. Rapp; June 25, 1928; Piqua, Ohio, US
- Died: July 12, 1989 (aged 61); Piqua, Ohio, US
- Education: University of Dayton; Saint Louis University School of Medicine
- Employer(s): NASA; Johnson Space Center
- Awards: NASA Exceptional Service Medal United States Civil Service Commission Federal Woman's Award; University of Dayton Distinguished Alumni Award Isker award

Rita Rapp (June 25, 1928 - July 12, 1989) was an American physiologist who led the Apollo Food System team. She won a NASA Exceptional Service Medal, the United States Civil Service Commission Federal Woman's Award and University of Dayton Distinguished Alumni Award. A plaque in her honor remains at the Johnson Space Center.

== Early life and education ==
Rapp was born in Piqua, Ohio. She attended Piqua Catholic High School. She completed a Bachelor of Science from the University of Dayton in 1950. She was one of the first women to join the Saint Louis University School of Medicine, and graduated in 1953. She completed her graduate research and physiology training at the University of Giessen.

== Career ==
Rapp joined Wright-Patterson Air Force Base in 1953, where she worked in the aeromedical laboratories. She studied the impact of high g-forces on the human body.

In 1960 Rapp joined the Space Task Group and worked on centrifugal affects. After the Apollo program began in 1966, Rapp joined the Apollo Food Systems team, looking at the stowage of food in space. She worked with Whirlpool Corporation and dietitians to identify ways space food could be packaged and prepared. She was the main interface between the food lab and the astronauts. She tried to use as much commercially available food as possible. Astronauts requested pumpkin pie and trail mix, but their favorite food was cream of chicken soup. Her sugar cookies were especially prized by the onboard crew. She prepared the individual meals of each Apollo astronaut separately and they each used color-coded eating utensils.

She moved to the Manned Spacecraft Center (now Johnson Space Center) in 1962. In 1971 she was awarded the United States Civil Service Commission Federal Woman's Award for her "extraordinary contributions to the Apollo program". She was the first woman from the Manned Spacecraft Center to be selected for the award; which was the highest honor of the federal government. Her developments were popular beyond NASA and used in the commercial food market.

When Skylab began in 1973, Rapp led a 30 person team. During Skylab, Rapp determined that astronauts need to consume about 3,000 calories a day. She was the first woman to win the Research & Development Associates For Military Food & Packaging Systems Isker award in 1975 in recognition of her contributions to food preparation and container research. She contributed to the NASA Apollo–Soyuz Test Project Report in 1977. In 1980 Rapp won the University of Dayton Distinguished Alumni Award. She was awarded a NASA Exceptional Service Medal in 1981. She preserved foods using dehydration, thermostabilization, irradiation and moisture control. In 1986 she published Space Shuttle Food-System Summary with Connie Stadler.

Rapp died on July 12, 1989, after a long illness. She was recognized as a space food pioneer. There is a collection of files relating to Rapp at the Piqua Library. Her biography appeared in Libby Jackson's A Galaxy of Her Own: Amazing Stories of Women in Space. A plaque that recognizes Rapp's commitment to the safety, health and comfort of the NASA flight crew, hangs at Johnson Space Center.
