= Patricia van Delden =

American diplomat

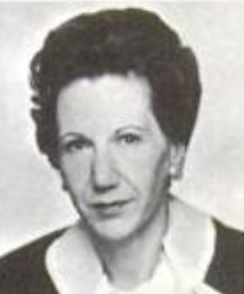
- Patricia van Delden, from a 1964 publication of the United States federal government
- Born: Patricia Louise Gillingham; April 5, 1908 (age 118); Los Angeles, California
- Other name: Sonneveer (code name)
- Occupations: American diplomat, cultural attaché
- Known for: Work in the Dutch Resistance during World War II
- Notable work: Order of Orange-Nassau; Federal Woman's Award (1964)

Patricia Gillingham van Delden (April 5, 1908 – died after 1970) was an American diplomat. During World War II, she was active in the Dutch resistance to the Nazis. After the war, she served in various postings in Japan, Germany, and the Netherlands for the United States Department of State. She received the Federal Woman's Award in 1964. Cold War scholar Giles Scott-Smith described her as "one of the most intriguing officials ever to work in the U. S. Embassy in The Hague."

== Early life and education ==
Patricia Louise (or Eloise) Gillingham was born in Los Angeles, California, the daughter of William Bartel Gillingham, a mining engineer, and Camillia Gillingham. Her parents divorced, and her mother's efforts to secure child support to raise Patricia made headlines.

Gillingham graduated from Belmont High School and the University of Southern California, and studied bacteriology in Munich, Zurich, and Vienna. She was a fluent German and Dutch speaker.

== Career ==
After her second husband was arrested by the Nazis in 1942, van Delden continued their work with the Dutch resistance, transmitting messages, forging documents, and smuggling maps under the code name "Sonneveer". For her efforts during World War II, she was awarded the Order of Orange-Nassau. Immediately after the war, she toured in the United States, telling her story to raise funds for refugee relief in Holland.

She joined the U. S. State Department in 1948, and led the Amerika Haus program in Germany. In 1952, she was transferred to Japan to supervise 23 cultural centers. There, she created the Nagano Seminar, an academic gathering of Japanese scholars studying American literature. In 1957 she facilitated Helen Keller's tour in Scandinavia. In 1959 she was cultural affairs officer at the American embassy in Copenhagen, and in 1960 she returned to The Hague. In 1964, van Delden was Deputy Public Affairs Officer, U.S. Information Agency (USIA) in Bonn, when she won the Federal Woman's Award.

In 1966, van Delden was offered as an example of an "overpaid officer" in a Congressional hearing on overseas operations, because her salary as deputy was greater than that of her immediate superior. She was one of the highest-paid women in the USIA that year. "Pat often raised hackles among male officers, particularly her superiors, because she was smarter than most of them," recalled a colleague, G. Lewis Schmidt, in 1988, "and she was an absolute fountain of extremely good ideas."

== Personal life ==
Patricia Gillingham married Robert M. Ziegler in 1929; they later divorced. She married her second husband, Dutch electrical engineer and patent attorney Louis Otto van Delden, in 1939. He was captured by the Nazis in 1942, and he died in a concentration camp in 1945. She married a third time, to Bart van der Laan, and retired in 1971 to the south of France.
