= Allene Jeanes =

American chemical researcher (1906–1995)

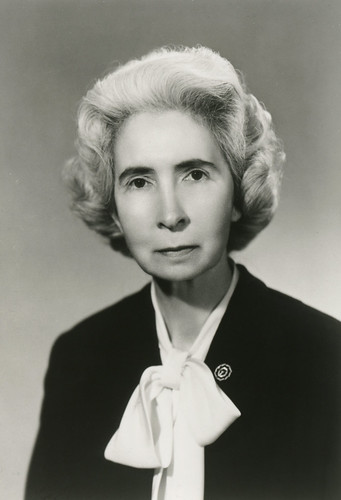
- Born: Allene Rosalind Jeanes; July 19, 1906; Waco, Texas, U.S.
- Died: December 11, 1995 (aged 89); Urbana, Illinois, U.S.
- Education: University of Illinois Urbana-Champaign
- Occupation: Chemist
- Known for: Developing Dextran
- Awards: National Inventors Hall of Fame

Allene Rosalind Jeanes (July 19, 1906 – December 11, 1995) was an American chemist whose work impacted carbohydrate chemistry. Born in 1906 in Texas, Jeanes' notable contributions include the development of Dextran, a lifesaving blood plasma substitute used in the Korean and Vietnam wars, and xanthan gum, a polysaccharide commonly used in the food, cosmetics, and pharmaceutical industries. Jeanes' innovations have had a lasting influence on medical treatments and everyday consumer products, highlighting her role as a key figure in applied carbohydrate science. Her achievements earned her numerous accolades, including being the first woman to receive the Distinguished Service Award from the U.S. Department of Agriculture.

== Early life and education ==
Jeanes was born July 19, 1906, in Waco, Texas, to Viola (Herring) and Largus Elonzo ("Lonnie") Jeanes, a switchman and later a yardmaster for the Cotton Belt Route of the St. Louis Southwestern Railway. Allene graduated with honors from Waco High School in 1924. In 1928, she received a bachelor's degree from Baylor University and graduated summa cum laude; in 1929, Jeanes obtained a master's degree in organic chemistry from the University of California, Berkeley.

From 1930 to 1935, Jeanes was employed as the head science teacher at Athens College in Athens, Alabama. She received her PhD in organic chemistry from University of Illinois Urbana-Champaign in 1938, after working with Roger Adams.

== Career ==
In 1938, Dr. Jeanes decided to accept a position at the National Institutes of Health in Washington D.C. And, from 1938 to 1940, Jeanes served as a corn industries research foundation fellow for the National Institutes of Health (NIH) with Claude Hudson and worked at the National Bureau of Standards with Horace S. Isbell.In 1941 she joined Roy L. Whistler at the U.S. Department of Agriculture's Northern Regional Research Lab (NRRL) in Peoria, Illinois, as a chemical researcher. She worked there until 1976. Jeanes is credited with "a prominent role in making NRRL a world-class center for applied carbohydrate science".

Jeanes' area of research was natural polysaccharides, including starch (found in wheat, corn, rice, and potatoes), cellulose (found in cotton, wood, and paper), and dextran. Jeanes was able to isolate dextran-producing bacteria from samples of bacteria-contaminated root beer supplied by a local Peoria company. This discovery was the basis for development of a mass production process for dextran, and its use in a dextran-based blood plasma extender. This plasma substitute was used by medical personal in the Korean and Vietnam wars. It was believed that using this sort of substance would keep someone who had lost a great deal of blood alive longer. So, the United States began using dextran to treat injured soldiers. As a result of her work, Jeanes was the first woman to receive the Distinguished Service Award given by the Department of Agriculture, in 1953. She was also awarded the Garvan Medal in 1956.

Jeanes was also part of the team that developed xanthan gum. Xanthan gum, derived from Xanthomonas campestris bacteria, completely revolutionized food processing due to its unique thickening and stabilizing properties. It's extensively used in products such as salad dressings, sauces, and baked goods to maintain texture and consistency. In the cosmetics industry, xanthan gum improves the texture of creams and lotions, making them more appealing to consumers.

In medicine, xanthan gum plays a role in creating more appetizing and stable pharmaceutical products. It's also essential in gluten-free baking, providing a substitute that mimics the texture and properties of gluten, greatly benefiting those with gluten intolerances or celiac disease.

Moreover, xanthan gum has applications beyond these industries. It is used in the oil and gas sector for drilling operations, demonstrating the versatility of Jeanes' innovation. The environmental friendliness of xanthan gum, as it is a biodegradable and non-toxic substance, makes it a preferred ingredient in various sectors.

Overall, Jeanes' work in this development has had a lasting impact, contributing to developments in food science, cosmetics, medicine, and energy applications. Her innovations and contributions continue to be used in various contexts of everyday life.

In her last published paper, "Immunological and Related Interactions with Dextrans Reviewed in Terms of Improved Structural Information," which was published in 1986, Jeanes shows her dedication to her work.

Over the course of her entire career, Allene Jeanes was awarded ten patents and produced sixty publications. These were all related to her work and discoveries. She was ultimately honored with a plethora of awards.

She was a member of the American Chemical Society, Sigma Xi, and Iota Sigma Pi.

== Later life ==
Jeanes died on December 11, 1995 in Urbana, Illinois. She was 89 years old.

== Awards ==
- 1953 – First woman to win Distinguished Service Award from the USDA.
- 1956 – Garvan Medal from the American Chemical Society.
- 1962 – Federal Woman's Award from the U.S. Civil Service Commission.
- 1968 – Superior Service Award to the Xanthan gum team, from the United States Department of Agriculture
- 1999 – posthumously inducted into the Agricultural Research Service Science Hall of Fame for her works in microbiological research that created life-saving polymers made from agricultural products.
- 2017 – posthumously inducted into the National Inventors Hall of Fame.
