= Roselyn P. Epps =

American pediatrician (1930–2014)

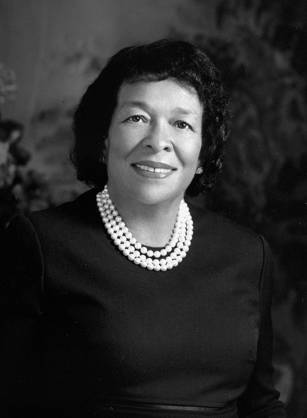
- Born: Roselyn Elizabeth Payne; December 11, 1930; Little Rock, Arkansas, US
- Died: September 29, 2014 (aged 83)
- Education: Howard University; Johns Hopkins University
- Spouse: Dr. Charles H. Epps
- Children: 4
- Scientific career
- Workplaces: DC Department of Public Health; Howard University; National Cancer Institute

Roselyn Elizabeth Payne Epps (née Payne; December 11, 1930 – September 29, 2014) was an American pediatrician and public health physician. She was the first African American president of the American Medical Women's Association and wrote more than 90 professional articles. She died on September 29, 2014, aged 83.

== Early life ==
Roselyn Elizabeth Payne was born on December 11, 1930 in Little Rock, Arkansas, but grew up in Savannah, Georgia. She attended Howard University in Washington D.C. where she majored in zoology and chemistry and continued her medical education there, graduating in 1955.

== Career ==
Epps earned her master's in public health from Johns Hopkins University in 1973, after completing her residency and working at the Bureau of Maternal and Child Health at the D.C. Department of Public Health for 10 years.

While working at the D.C. Department of Health Epps held many titles such as chief of the Infant and Preschool Division, director of the Children and Youth Project, and chief of the Bureau of Maternal and Child Health. Epps was appointed to the position of commissioner of public health in the Department of Public Health in D.C. in 1980, where she supervised 3,000 employees and managed a $35 million budget.

From 1984 to 1989, Epps, acting as chief of Child Development Division and director of the Child Development Center at Howard University, worked on a project to help identify children with learning disabilities and assist them, their schools, and their parents. She was a scientific program administrator at the National Cancer Institute of the National Institutes of Health from 1995 to 1998. During this time she focused on spreading knowledge about smoking prevention and cessation research results both nationally and internationally. In a separate project, she focused on cancer screening and diagnosis.

In 1988, Epps was the first woman and the first African American to become president of the American Academy of Pediatrics, Washington D.C. chapter. Three years later, she was elected as president of the American Medical Women's Association (AMWA). She was also the first African American to hold this position. A year after that, in 1992, Epps was the first African American woman to become president of the Medical Society of the District of Columbia.

As the national president of the AMWA, she worked on establishing the AMWA Foundation, which funds its women's health initiatives and to support advocacy for research, volunteer services and scholarship programs. Epps established the D.C. metropolitan area chapter of Girls, Inc.

== Major works ==
Dr. Roselyn P. Epps authored more than 90 professional articles, 16 of which were published as chapters of books. She also co-edited The Women's Complete Healthbook and Developing a Child Care Program.

== Family ==
She was married to her medical school classmate, Dr. Charles H. Epps, an orthopedic surgeon. Three of their children earned MD degrees, and one holds an MBA.

== Awards ==
- Foremother Award from the National Center for Health Research, 2007
