= Your Money or Your Life =

"Your money or your life" is a phrase used by highwaymen during robberies.

Your Money or Your Life may also refer to:

- Your Money or Your Life (1961 film), a film directed by Jerzy Skolimowski
- Your Money or Your Life (1932 film), an Italian film
- Your Money or Your Life (1966 film), a French-German comedy film starring Fernandel
- "Your Money or Your Life" (George and Mildred), a 1976 television episode
- Your Money or Your Life: Transforming Your Relationship with Money and Achieving Financial Independence, a book by Joe Dominguez and Vicki Robin about simple living
- Your Money Or Your Life, a book by Neil Cavuto (compiled comments of his business show's ending comments)
- Your Money or Your Life, a UK television series presented by Alvin Hall, who also wrote a book of the same name based on the series
- Your Money or Your Life, a fictional television game show featured in the movie Time Bandits
- Your Money or Your Life, a demand made of comedian Jack Benny in one of his most famous sketches
- Your money or your life: Strong medicine for America's health care system, a 2004 book by economist David Cutler
