= Nicholas Rossi =

American sex offender and fugitive (1987–2026)

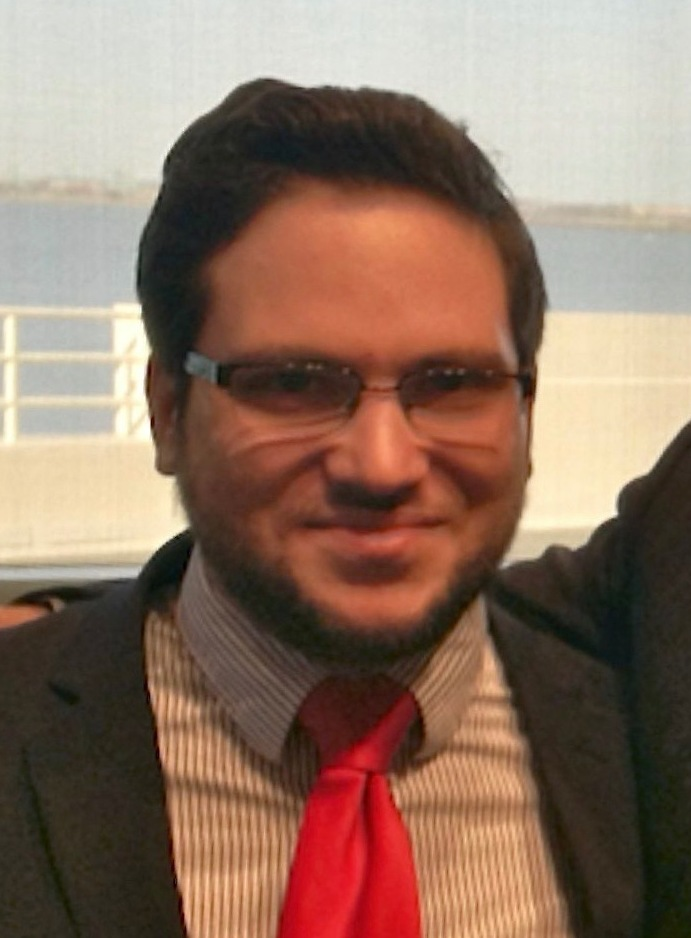
- Rossi in 2012
- Born: July 11, 1987; Providence, Rhode Island, U.S.
- Died: June 25, 2026 (aged 38); Utah, U.S.
- Other names: Nicholas Rossi; Nicholas Alahverdian Rossi; Nicholas Edward Rossi; Nicholas Alahverdian-Rossi; Nick Alan; Nicholas Brown; Nicholas Brown Knight; Arthur Brown; Arthur Knight
- Criminal charges: Indecent exposure (2008); Sexual assault (2022); Rape (2025)
- Penalty: Registration as a sex offender (2008); Two sentences of five years to life (2025)

Nicholas Rossi (July 11, 1987 – June 25, 2026), also known as Nicholas Alahverdian and Arthur Knight, among other aliases, was an American sex offender and child welfare activist who faked his own death in 2020.

Rossi alleged that he suffered abuse and negligence from the Department of Children, Youth and Families (DCYF), Rhode Island's social service system. In support of this allegation, he sued the DCYF in federal court in 2011, then voluntarily dismissed the lawsuit when Rhode Island waived his medical expenses debt of around $200,000.

In January 2020, Rossi said that he had been diagnosed with non-Hodgkin lymphoma. In February 2020, news outlets reported Rossi's death, citing his family's anonymous testimony and his obituary. The reports of his death were disputed, as they occurred after the FBI initiated a fraud investigation against him, while Rhode Island police had issued a warrant for him for failure to register as a sex offender.

In October 2021, Rossi was identified in a hospital in Glasgow, Scotland, undergoing treatment for COVID-19. He was arrested that December on charges of an alleged rape in Utah in 2008, for which a sealed arrest warrant had been issued in September 2020, and other alleged crimes. In November 2022, Edinburgh Sheriff Court ruled that the arrested man was Nicholas Rossi, despite his claims of mistaken identity. In August 2023, a sheriff ruled that he could be extradited to the United States; this was confirmed by Scottish Justice Secretary Angela Constance in October 2023, and he was extradited on January 5, 2024.

He gave up his claim of mistaken identity in a Utah court on August 23, 2024, and during a bail hearing on October 16 of that year formally admitted to faking his death. Rossi was subsequently convicted in two separate rape cases in August and September 2025 by courts in Salt Lake County, Utah and Provo, Utah respectively. He was sentenced to imprisonment for 10 years to life and died in prison in 2026.

== Biography ==
=== Early life ===
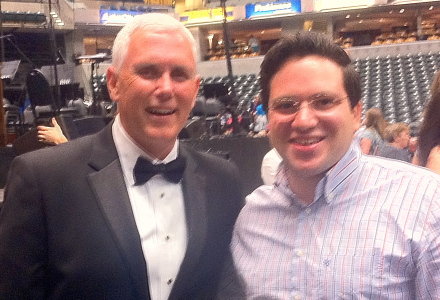
Rossi with then-Governor of Indiana Mike Pence in 2013

He was born Nicholas Alahverdian in Providence, Rhode Island on July 11, 1987. He alleged that his parents were "abusive and alcoholic" and "couldn't take care of him", leading to his placement in the care of the Rhode Island Department of Children, Youth & Families (DCYF). His birth father, who was of Armenian descent, had convictions for domestic assault and drug dealing. He left the family when Nicholas was three. His mother remarried in 1994, to David Rossi, and Nicholas took his stepfather’s name. Early in his life, Nicholas was diagnosed with behavioral and mental health issues. His stepfather stated: "He just wouldn't listen in school, he hit the mother, hit the grandmother all the time, hit his siblings. I used to have to hold him down, and he'd be spitting at me". When Nicholas was 10 years old, his stepfather David Rossi said he lost his patience during a family trip when his stepson would not stop hitting his mother. David Rossi beat him badly enough to put him in the hospital and was arrested for assault. The police eventually dropped the charges. Exactly what happened next is disputed by various family members, but Nicholas Rossi became a ward of the state. He was placed in psychiatric care at Butler Hospital and later, Bradley Hospital. At Butler, doctors diagnosed him with narcissistic personality disorder and attention deficit disorder. After being discharged from a treatment program, he briefly went back to his family home but was removed and placed into the care of DCYF as a result of creating conflict within his family home.

Rossi alleged that, for a period of 15 months beginning in March 2002, the DCYF placed him in their "night-to-night" program, in which a youth would spend days at a DCYF building in Pawtucket and nights at one of several shelters around Rhode Island, including locations in Central Falls, Providence, Narragansett, or Woonsocket. He said he did not attend school during this period. According to Rossi, the other youths stole his belongings and threatened and assaulted him during his time there. The Providence Journal, in April 2012, described the night-to-night program as a "stifling" experience and said Rossi was "denied a substantial chunk of his childhood".

Rossi was hired as a legislative page in the Rhode Island House of Representatives at age 14. Rossi said that he informed lawmakers about his negative experience in DCYF care, but received no assistance. Brian G. Coogan, a Rhode Island Representative at the time, stated that he felt sorry for the teenage Rossi and took action to formally adopt him, but was warned off from doing so by Family Court Chief Judge Jeremiah S. Jeremiah. Coogan said that Jeremiah predicted that Rossi "will try to undermine you and turn your family upside-down".

Local media reported that Rossi was sent by DCYF to Boys Town in Nebraska and Manatee Palms Youth Services in Florida in 2003. In a 2011 lawsuit filed against the Rhode Island DCYF, he testified that he was prohibited from contacting others, such as the media, attorneys, the state child advocate, and his caseworker during this period. Rossi alleged that he was sent out of state because, in Rhode Island, he was "a source of information on DCYF". Rhode Island authorities stated that there were no records of Rossi being abused.

According to a DCYF spokesperson, they stopped using Manatee Palms Youth Services in 2005 due to "concerns we had with the way they were treating our kids". In 2005, Rossi was returned to Rhode Island, where he received treatment at Bradley Hospital for two weeks. Afterwards, he was placed in an independent living program.

Rossi told WPRI that he was beaten daily in Florida, Nebraska, and Rhode Island by other youths in DCYF programs. Rossi told WJAR that he suffered "torture, beatings, assault", and neglect under DCYF care until 2005. Coogan said that Jeremiah told him that Rossi was the one who was abusive to others.

=== Education and sexual imposition conviction ===
After Rossi left the DCYF system, a couple in Ohio, Sharon and Charles Lane, became what The Daily Beast called "de facto foster parents" to him.

Acquaintances said that Rossi preyed upon women who had recently been dumped or were otherwise emotionally fragile. The earliest accusation of rape against Rossi that The Daily Beast could find was in 2006, when he and his alleged victim were 18 years old. She said they met online and initially got on well, though she later came to believe that his pleasant personality was a rehearsed act. When they met in person, she said that he constantly pressured her for sex. When she refused, she alleged that he threatened her and then raped her. Thinking that nobody would believe her, she did not report it to the police. In late 2007, Rossi was questioned by Utah police after an 18 year old woman accused him of rape, though he was apparently not arrested or charged.

Two Sinclair Community College students in Ohio accused Rossi of sexual assault. The first one, who accused him of groping her while masturbating in his apartment, decided not to press charges when police suggested that it would be difficult to prove anything in court. Another student said she met Rossi on campus and had lunch with him, after which he offered to walk with her to her next class. Then in a basement stairwell, he pinned her against a wall, groped her and masturbated. When she protested, he said: "I'm almost done. Don't be a bitch." She said that Rossi later apologized and told her "he couldn't help it" because she was "so beautiful—and not to tell anybody". She made a police report. Prosecutors told her that she also lacked enough evidence for a case, but when Rossi filed a police report accusing her of being the aggressor, they moved forward. Around the same time, another ex-girlfriend alleged to police that he had bruised her, bitten her, and told her that he found it sexually arousing when she declined to have sex. When questioned, Rossi told police the sex was consensual.

Later in 2008, Rossi was convicted of public indecency and sexual imposition for the second incident at Sinclair Community College, and was required to register as a sex offender. He filed a motion for a retrial based on a newly surfaced Myspace post allegedly written by the victim, which claimed that she had lied about the incident. At an evidentiary hearing in 2011, a computer forensics expert testified "with 90% certainty" that the post had been altered or fabricated entirely. The motion for retrial was dismissed by the reviewing judge.

For a short period of time, Rossi studied comparative literature in extension program classes offered by Harvard University. He did not graduate: in 2012, he was "administratively withdrawn" from the course when the university learned of his sex offender status. Despite this, Rossi claimed to be a "Harvard scholar, political scientist and sociologist".

After Rossi failed to overturn his sex offender conviction, "he became a men's rights figurehead for radicalized people" who claim they are unable to get romantic or sexual partners despite desiring them—often referred to as incels. Despite having no legal qualifications, Rossi provided legal advice to AV4M, a right-wing extremist website that the SPLC labeled as a hate group. Rossi ignored the requirement to register as a sex offender in multiple states.

In April 2013, he sued Sinclair Community College, Dayton Municipal Court, and multiple others in the Southern Ohio United States District Court for making "serious, life-altering false allegations" and claimed he was deprived of a jury trial. This suit was dismissed by judge Thomas M. Rose on August 12, 2013. Rossi also sued his victim, accusing her of libel as she had described him as "crazy". Rossi's claim was found to be without merit in 2014. Rossi wrote an essay on Medium in 2015 called "My Personal 911", which he named and blamed his victim for ruining his "goals and aspirations", comparing the victim's actions to the September 11 attacks.

=== Early marriages and legal issues ===
In July 2010, a woman made a police report in Pawtucket, Rhode Island, that Rossi brought her to his dwelling, took her cellphone, stopped her from leaving while threatening suicide, asked her to sit on his lap and kiss him, and only let her go after she screamed at him. Rossi later told police that he was "currently being treated for depression", so they sent him to undergo psychological evaluation. In December 2010, a woman made a police report in Pawtucket, Rhode Island, that she had dinner with Rossi and then visited his apartment, continually rejected his requests for sex, and accused him of stopping her from leaving, forcing her to pay him $200 and to declare on video that she "could not pursue legal action and that the money she gave him was for therapy for him due to her violent actions and her sexual addiction" before she could leave his custody.

Rossi first married on November 5, 2010, and his wife divorced him in May 2011. Prior to the divorce, his wife made a police report stating he repeatedly called her despite her having an active restraining order. The police initiated an arrest warrant against Rossi "for violation of a protection order".

In November 2010, police visited Rossi's apartment in Rhode Island after reports of raised voices inside. While outside, the police heard screaming from a woman and a man. The woman answered the door with marks around her left eye, neck and arms, and swelling around her right eye. Police saw Rossi begging the woman: "I'm sorry ... can we talk about this?" The woman said that she had argued with Rossi, and that he "grabbed her and knocked her to the ground and held her down" when she wanted to leave their apartment, and also slapped her face. Police arrested an uncooperative Rossi, who proclaimed his innocence and "started hitting his head up against the bars on the back window" of the police cruiser, resulting in the police using pepper spray to stop him. As a result of this incident, Rossi pleaded no contest to domestic simple assault.

Rossi moved to Utah in 2015, where he lived with the Lanes. In October of that year, Rossi married for the second time. Seven months later, his second wife moved to divorce him. A court ruled that Rossi was "guilty of gross neglect of duty and extreme cruelty" towards his wife. Temporary restraining orders had been put in place against Rossi, which the court ruled that he violated by seizing "all of the marital household goods and furnishings from the marital residence". The divorce was finalized in 2017, after which Rossi owed his ex-wife $52,000 he borrowed to purportedly support a community service agency. His second wife said she met the "smooth talker" Rossi through a singles ward of the Church of Jesus Christ of Latter-day Saints, and that he claimed to be a Mormon. She accused him of becoming "violent" the day after they were married. During their marriage, she said Rossi "tried to hurt [her] with a knife", threatened suicide, controlled her appearance, "wanted [her] to stay confined to the house", and cut her off from friends and family. After their divorce, Rossi failed to adhere to the judge's order to pay her over $7,000 in overdue spousal support and legal fees, instead leaving Ohio for Rhode Island. The case against Rossi was dismissed when she did not pursue prosecution. His ex-wife later alleged that she found files that Rossi kept on young female students.

In 2017, Rossi lived with a friend in Providence, Rhode Island. The friend later applied for a restraining order against Rossi, accusing Rossi of refusing to move out and cashing checks belonging to the friend. The same year, Utah investigators began processing a backlog of untested sexual assault kits. In 2018, one of the Utah kits (originally from 2008) was revealed to match Nicholas Rossi's DNA from an investigation of the 2008 Ohio sexual assault. A sealed arrest warrant for Rossi was issued in September 2020.

Rossi traveled to Dublin, Ireland, in June 2017 and eventually settled in Essex, England, where he met a blogger. While living under his real name, he entered into what she described as an abusive relationship that culminated in an alleged rape. She later started a support group on social media for his alleged victims.

=== Faked death and flight from justice ===
Rossi eventually settled in South Bristol, England, with a woman named Miranda Knight. According to Miranda's brother, Rossi dated Miranda in 2019, and they married in early 2020. None of Rossi's family or friends were present at the ceremony. Rossi never spoke about his family and told Miranda he was from Dublin, Ireland, and was working in online marketing and public relations, said Miranda's brother. He was going by the name "Nicholas Brown" at this time.

Shortly before he faked his death in early 2020, Rossi was aware that the FBI was investigating him for fraud. His former foster mother, Sharon Lane, alleged that Rossi had opened 22 credit cards under her husband's name, incurring almost $200,000 in debt. In January 2020, Rossi reported that he had been diagnosed with non-Hodgkin lymphoma. He provided this information to a number of media organizations. The Providence Journal later stated that Rossi "insisted" that they report his illness. A person claiming to be Rossi's widow later stated that his illness had lasted for "months", and included "heart disease" and "heart attacks". According to his family and his obituary, Rossi succumbed to the disease on February 29, 2020. The person claiming to be his widow said that Rossi would be cremated and his remains scattered at sea. She refused to provide copies of Rossi's death certificate to The Providence Journal.

Upon Rossi's purported death, WPRI reported that he had emigrated from the United States approximately four years earlier. Someone claiming to be his wife attributed this to "security concerns". Rossi's purported wife would not publicly reveal her identity or where the family had moved, citing threats.

According to Rossi's former lawyer, Jeffrey B. Pine, Rossi had moved to Ireland by late 2019, which would hinder any attempt by the FBI to have him arrested as such an arrest would require "international cooperation". However, Rossi's actual location was unclear. Rossi told The Providence Journal that he and his family had moved to Quebec, Canada. A Rhode Island priest recounted that Rossi's purported widow stated that he had moved to Switzerland. Rhode Island state representative Raymond Hull believed that Rossi's purported widow said that he had moved to either Ireland or Germany.

After faking his death, Rossi allegedly posed as a marketing expert and defrauded Canadian businesswoman Nafsika Antypas of $40,000. Antypas said she hired Rossi (who was posing as Nicholas Knight-Brown) to promote her vegan lifestyle television series, Plant-Based by Nafsika, but he failed to do any work. When Antypas ended their working relationship, Rossi allegedly sent her abuse and threats, and posted lies about her online, but eventually ceased contact in June 2020. Antypas said police in the UK and Ireland were no help, and she expressed frustration that Rossi could have been caught earlier if someone had investigated her complaints.

In 2021, Rossi and Miranda moved to Glasgow, Scotland. There, he claimed to be a professor teaching at the nearby University of Glasgow. According to a neighbor in Glasgow, Rossi said he was "creating a textbook on religious education for schools", used an English accent, and had blond hair and a mustache. "For someone who was on the run, he really liked to draw attention to himself," the neighbor remarked.

==== Authenticity of death questioned ====
In July 2020, Rhode Island State Police began investigating the authenticity of Rossi's death; no conclusion had been reached by January 2021. The investigation was triggered by allegations that Rossi was still alive, coupled with an outstanding warrant against Rossi on account of his failing to register as a sex offender in Rhode Island in relation to his 2008 conviction in Ohio.

Rossi's former foster mother, Sharon Lane, said that she had been approached by Rossi's biological mother in July 2020, who asked her to probe reports of his death. When Lane read the comments of praise written in his obituary and memorials, she became convinced that the writing style was Rossi's and that he had therefore faked his death. Rossi's former attorney Jeffrey B. Pine also expressed doubts concerning Rossi's death, as the announcements of his illness and death came shortly after Rossi learned of the FBI's investigation against him. Rossi's purported widow denied that he had faked his death, stating that he died in her presence.

In late 2020, the website Wikipediocracy raised issues about the accuracy of Wikipedia's article regarding Rossi. Michael Cockram, a Wikipediocracy blog team member, said that multiple Wikipedia accounts created by Rossi had edited the Wikipedia page after the date of his purported death, and that one of these accounts had tried to remove the image used to illustrate Rossi, replacing it with an image of another person. Cockram, who believed that Rossi was still alive, alleged that Rossi was now trying to take down the Wikipedia article about him and remove any information that disputed his reported death.

On February 1, 2021, The Providence Journal stated that they had received a "rambling", "often incoherent" nine-page email from someone stating they were Rossi's widow. The email leveled criticisms against several parties, such as the victim of his sexual offense, the police officer who took the sex offense case, the judge who oversaw the case, and Rossi's former foster parents. They reported that several months after Rossi's reported death, Father Bernard Healey, a priest at Our Lady of Mercy Church in East Greenwich, received a request for a funeral mass from a woman claiming to be Rossi's widow. Shortly after arrangements were made, State Police Detective Conor O'Donnell requested cancellation of the mass, stating that Rossi had faked his death and was a fugitive. Healey later described the woman he spoke to as sounding like Hyacinth Bucket, with "a very high-pitched English woman's accent"; he was advised by the police that the caller was Rossi using a "voice disguiser".

In February 2021, Irish newspaper Sunday World reported they were unable to find an Irish death certificate for anyone under Rossi's name.

==== 2020s sexual assault investigations ====
In 2022, a court document was released by a Utah law enforcement officer regarding the investigation of Rossi. The document noted police reports against Rossi in Massachusetts, Rhode Island, Ohio, and Utah "involving criminal cases of sex assault, harassment, and possible kidnapping from 2007 through 2019."

One report in the document was provided by an ex-girlfriend of Rossi. She accused him of inviting her to his home in Orem in September 2008 on the pretext of repaying the money he owed her. He exposed himself to her, raped her, then accused her of being "mentally unstable and too emotional". After the attack, he attempted to prevent her from leaving, requiring her to escape when he was distracted. The other cases reported showed a "consistent pattern of behavior" according to a Utah investigator, whereby Rossi was accused of starting "inappropriate contact", then he would "threaten suicide or force a non-consensual sexual encounter", and later tell police "that the female is the aggressor".

On July 13, 2022, the office of the Salt Lake County District Attorney Sim Gill filed charges against Rossi for first degree sexual assault and issued a no-bail warrant for his arrest. The new affidavit alleged that after a fight with the victim in 2008, Rossi would not let her leave the bedroom, ultimately throwing her to the bed and raping her.

=== Arrest in Scotland and extradition ===
The FBI tracked Rossi to Scotland via his cell phone records and iCloud account, which documented his life in Scotland. On December 13, 2021, Rossi was arrested at Queen Elizabeth University Hospital, Glasgow, with regard to the alleged rape in Utah in 2008, among other alleged crimes. He was receiving treatment for COVID-19 under the name Arthur Knight. Rossi was identified by his tattoos and fingerprints. Scarring on one arm suggested Rossi had tried to remove one of the tattoos. Rossi was granted bail while at the hospital. The court expected him to remain in the hospital for weeks, but Rossi left the day after he made bail.

In January 2022, The Providence Journal publicized Rossi's arrest, which was confirmed by the Rhode Island State Police. Representative Hull, who had been a police officer for 34 years, said he had "never come across someone who would fake his own death". Hull additionally lamented how this "set back a bit" efforts to reform the DCYF. After Rossi missed his hearing at the Edinburgh Sheriff Court, he was arrested again in Glasgow, had his bail revoked, and was remanded into custody. He was addressed as Arthur Knight by his lawyers in court and denied that he was "Nicholas Rossi". He was again granted bail in early February 2022.

In mid-February, Sky News set up a video call between Rossi and former Representative Coogan, who knew Rossi for over 20 years. Rossi claimed not to know Coogan, but Coogan identified him. When Coogan mentioned Rossi's scars and tattoos, the video call was ended abruptly.

Rossi delayed the hearings in Scotland through what the journalist Steven Godden described as "rambling courtroom monologues, questionable medical episodes and theatrical outbursts". Godden called Rossi's attempts to hide his identity surreal and unconvincing. At one point, Rossi claimed someone tattooed him while he was unconscious at the hospital. In June, Rossi claimed to be "mostly bedridden" and accused the prosecutor attempting to extradite him, of "ritualized child sex abuse". Advocate Depute Paul Harvey told the court that there was "an emerging picture of someone seeking by every means possible to delay these proceedings." After failing to attend another hearing, purportedly because of COVID, the court was told that he had refused to voluntarily submit DNA and fingerprints. The sheriff ordered him to provide the samples and to bring proof of his identity.

In July, Rossi was detained in Glasgow for threatening and abusing NHS staff. Prosecutor Julie Clark stated that there was evidence he was in fact fit to go to court and to be detained, despite previous claims to the contrary. He denied the charges when he appeared at Glasgow Sheriff Court. His application for bail was refused, and he was remanded in custody until his next court appearance. Prosecutor Julie Clark told the court his fingerprints identified him as Nicholas Rossi. Clark also told the court that Rossi faked seizures and doctors reported that he had no lung problems. The following month, Rossi was convicted of threatening hospital staff, who said they feared for their safety after telling Rossi that he was fit to be discharged. The sheriff said Rossi's claim that he could not stand was "not credible". Rossi had appeared at hearings using a wheelchair. He also wore a black robe and kippah, as he claimed to have converted to Judaism while in custody.

In November 2022, sheriff Norman McFadyen ruled using the standard of the balance of probabilities that the arrested man's identity was Nicholas Rossi, basing his ruling on fingerprint, tattoo and photographic evidence. Harvey called Rossi's excuses "outlandish" and "bizarre". Later in November, Essex Police said Rossi was under investigation for an alleged rape there, which would likely delay any extradition should this result in charges. In January 2023, his application to be released on bail was refused. He also claimed he was being taunted by remand prisoners at HM Prison Edinburgh singing "Leaving on a Jet Plane" by John Denver to him.

In a February 2023 podcast, British journalist Jane MacSorley alleged that Rossi's wife Miranda Louisa Knight pretended to be his widow "Louise" and helped spread the fake news of his death. Miranda said the allegation was "laughable" but did not respond once audio comparisons of the voices of Miranda and "Louise" were played. Frederika Holmes, an independent expert in forensic speech and voice analysis, concluded that Miranda and "Louise" were the same person based on Miranda's Bristol accent. She said it was implausible that technology could mimic this.

In December 2023, the High Court of Justiciary ruled that Rossi should be extradited, upholding a decision by the Scottish government to approve the extradition request. The investigation over whether there was enough evidence to charge him with rape in Essex was still ongoing at the time. He was extradited to the United States on January 5, 2024. Upon detention in Utah, Rossi made a formal request through his lawyer that the court assure the county jailers refer to him as "Arthur Knight"; the request was denied by the district court judge.

A four-part documentary about Rossi, Imposter: The Man Who Came Back from the Dead, shown on the UK's Channel 4 in May 2024, was described by reviewer Lucy Mangan as "the absolute zenith of true-crime TV".

=== Post-extradition trial and conviction ===
Rossi's two 2008 rape charges were tried separately in different district courts in 2025. The first trial, in Salt Lake County, was defended by Samantha Dugan and presided over by 3rd District Court Judge Barry G. Lawrence. The second trial, in Utah County, was presided over by 4th District Judge Derek P. Pullan. Both trials were delayed after Rossi insisted that he was actually Knight and would self-represent.

On August 22, 2024, Judge Lawrence ordered that Rossi, also known as Nicholas Rossi, stand trial in Utah, with his arraignment and bail hearing scheduled for October 17. The same day, shortly after Rossi agreed to be represented by Dugan, the claim of mistaken identity was abandoned by the defense. At a bail hearing on October 16, 2024, he admitted to having faked his death and identity, crediting it to his early years of traumatic abuse, as well as receiving "two credible death threats" via phone and email from "elected officials with the government of Rhode Island." He refused to identify them when pressed by the prosecutor, stating that it would "stoke the fire they've had to continue their actions against [him]"; he was ultimately deemed a flight risk and denied bail.

In May 2025 the judges presiding over both cases decided to hold evidentiary hearings in private due to concerns over case publicity and how it would impact the jury pool.

The Salt Lake County trial took place in August 2025 and concluded on August 14. The Utah County trial concluded in September 2025. In both cases, Rossi was found guilty of rape. For the first rape conviction, he was sentenced to five years to life. (Note: Utah uses indeterminate sentencing, with a convict's release date, if any, decided by the Board of Pardons and Parole.) On November 4, 2025, Rossi was sentenced to another five years to life to be served after the completion of the first sentence.

=== Death ===
Rossi died on June 25, 2026, at a local hospital "from complications of an existing medical condition after choosing to discontinue medical treatment", according to the Utah Department of Corrections, which also said he had "chronic, degenerative conditions". He was 38.

== Child welfare advocacy ==
When Rossi returned to Rhode Island in the 2010s, he reinvented himself as a crusader for child welfare and aggressively sought connections with politicians and reporters. Rossi eagerly provided quotations to reporters, but he did not talk much about his life in Utah or Ohio, where he had been accused of sexually assaulting women. Dan McGowan, a reporter for the Boston Globe, said that Rossi's stories "mostly checked out", and when he raised Rossi's legal issues with another reporter, they were willing to give Rossi the benefit of the doubt because of his difficult family life.

Rossi founded NexusGovernment, an organization to lobby for child welfare.

In March 2011, after meeting Rossi, state representative Roberto DaSilva submitted a proposal to further restrict DCYF from using facilities outside of Rhode Island; the proposal was also a cost-cutting measure. DaSilva credited Rossi's story as inspiration for his proposed legislation. The proposed legislation failed, so DaSilva re-submitted the proposal in January 2012 and it was given a hearing the following month, but shelved for "further study" in mid-March.

In February 2020, Rhode Island state representatives Raymond Hull, John J. Lombardi, David Bennett, and James N. McLaughlin proposed an "Emergency Oversight Commission" to monitor DCYF, as advocated by Rossi. According to WPRI's reporting, if the legislation passed, nine state representatives would form a commission to investigate "unconstitutional or unethical procedures at DCYF that put children in harm's way", with a report to be published in May 2021. Hull's proposed legislation was not voted upon and died in committee. Hull later said that Rossi had continually pressed him to introduce this legislation before faking his death, describing the process as being that Rossi would "just beat you down".

Former Rhode Island state representatives spoke in 2022 about their past experiences with Rossi. Coogan described Rossi as "brilliant" but "dangerous", accusing Rossi of having "swindled a lot of people", by persuading some Rhode Island lawmakers to give him money, sometimes via threats of accusing them of rape and assault. Joanne Giannini said that Rossi continually asked her for money. After initially acceding to his requests, Giannini eventually told him to "get a job". This resulted in Rossi saying "so many horrible things" to her, "He knew how to hurt you with words. The whole thing really bothered me."

=== Lawsuit against the DCYF ===
In February 2011, Rossi initiated a federal lawsuit against the DCYF, the states of Florida and Nebraska, six residential facilities, and 18 individuals, for alleged abuse committed against him. Among the individuals sued were Rhode Island Governor Donald Carcieri and Family Court Chief Judge Jeremiah S. Jeremiah.

In August 2013, the federal lawsuit was settled by the parties, in exchange for Rhode Island waiving a more than $200,000 lien that was placed on any settlement proceeds from the lawsuit. The lien was for medical expenses incurred while he was in state foster care. The lawsuit concluded with the DCYF expressly denying any "liability or culpability regarding the allegations" according to the DCYF's deputy director Kevin Aucoin. Rossi acknowledged that he had released the state of Rhode Island and its government employees from liability. The court itself did not reveal details of the settlement. Rossi also agreed to dismiss two other lawsuits he had filed, one which accused DCYF of violating a confidentiality agreement, and another against state sheriffs.

== See also ==
- List of fugitives from justice who disappeared
