= Kitty Chen =

American actress, and playwright

Kitty Mei-Mei Chen
- Born: Kitty; 1944 (age 81–82); Shanghai
- Citizenship: United States
- Education: Pembroke College in Brown University
- Occupation: Actor Playwriter
- Years active: 1973

Kitty Mei-Mei Chen is a playwright and actress and the author of five full-length plays and numerous short plays and children's stories. She received the 1992–1993 National Endowment for the Arts Fellowship in Playwriting.

== Early life ==
Chen was born in Shanghai, China, and raised in Philadelphia, Pennsylvania.

== Education ==
Chen earned a Bachelor of Arts degree in mathematics from Pembroke College in Brown University. After graduation, Chen went to New York City to study at the Martha Graham School as a scholarship student, acted professionally for many years before becoming a playwright. Chen resides in New York City.

== Career ==
=== Writing ===
Chen's received an NEA playwriting fellowship for her first play, Eating Chicken Feet. It had a first public reading at East West Players in Los Angeles, was workshopped at Playwright's Theatre of New Jersey, and subsequently was co-produced at Westside Theatre by Women's Project and Pan Asian Repertory. Blending the absurd and playful with the dark and painful, the play examines the effects of divorce on a Chinese-American family. "Ms. Chen's dramatic imagination is obviously unusual. More important, it is always unpredictable," writes The New York Times. It was also produced in Hawaii at Kumu Kahua Theater.

Rowing to America has been published in two anthologies under the same title, ROWING TO AMERICA AND OTHER SHORT PLAYS. The first, commissioned by Playwrights Theatre of New Jersey, is a group of one-act plays about the immigrant experience. "After you see these nine short plays about immigration, you'd have to have a heart of industrial-strength plastic not to be grateful that your ancestors took the plunge." Newark Star Ledger. The second is a compilation of short plays from the first playwrights lab at the Women's Project. The play also appears online: http://berkshirereview.net/theater/kmcrowing.html. Short work samples at https://web.archive.org/web/20110615135627/http://www.nyfa.org/nyfa_artists_detail.asp?pid=2722

"Rosa Loses Her Face" was a Winter 2009 co-production of Queens Theatre in the Park, NY, and Electric Theatre Company, Scranton, Pa. It had been produced in an earlier version by Luna Stage, Montclair, NJ, in 1997.

=== Acting ===
An actor since 1973, she appeared on the legitimate stage in leading roles in four early Pan Asian productions and many other plays. She is a member of The Dramatists Guild, Women's Project Playwrights Lab, and the three actors unions. Chen made her movie debut in ‘’Static’’ in 1986. Since then, she has appeared mainly on television, with featured roles in two daytime dramas ‘’All My Children’’ and ‘’As the World Turns.’’ She is a frequent guest on ‘’Law & Order,’’ produced by her fellow Brown University graduate, Jeffrey L. Hayes, and ‘’Law & Order: Special Victims Unit.’’

== Awards ==
Chen received a National Endowment for the Arts Fellowship in Playwriting in 1992. She has received two fellowships from the New York Foundation for the Arts, Edward Albee Foundation, and Blue Mountain Center, and Urban Stages Emerging Playwright Award, among others.

== Plays ==
- Missus Mustard (in progress)
- Rosa Loses Her Face (2009)
- Blessings of Chairman Moo (2003)
- Rowing to America: The Immigrant Project (1999)
- "I See My Bones" (1997)
- Eating Chicken Feet (1995)

Numerous short plays.

== Filmography ==
- Static (1986)
