= Pembroke College, Brown University =

American women's college (1891–1971)

Coordinates: 41.8292°N 71.4026°W

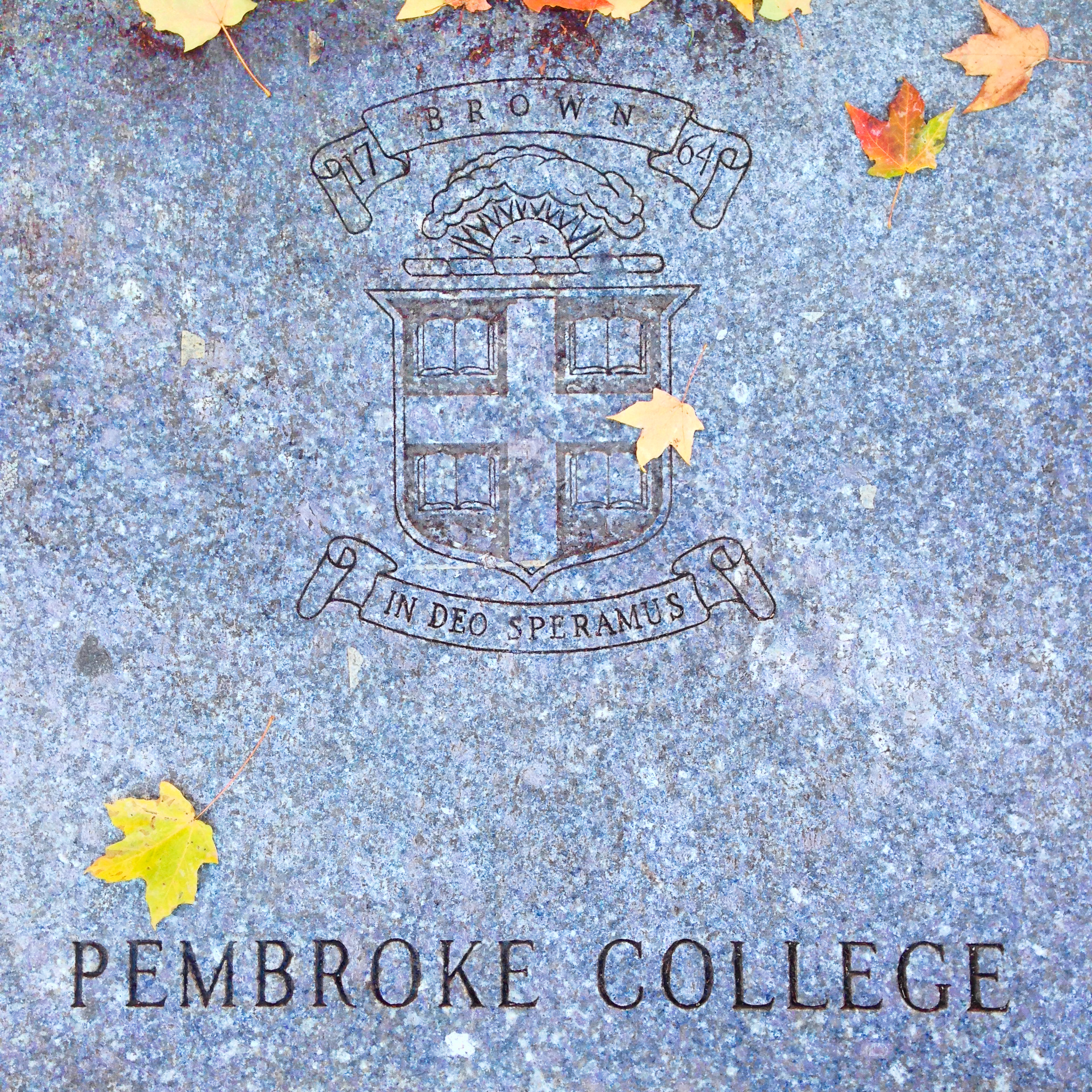
- This engraved stone on Brown's Pembroke Campus serves as a memorial of Pembroke College
- Type: Private liberal arts college Women's college
- Active: 1891–1971 (fully incorporated into Brown University, which became co-educational)
- Affiliations: Brown University
- Location: Providence, Rhode Island, United States
- Campus: Urban

Pembroke College, Brown University was the coordinate women's college for Brown University in Providence, Rhode Island. It was founded in 1891 and merged into Brown University in 1971.

== Founding and early history ==
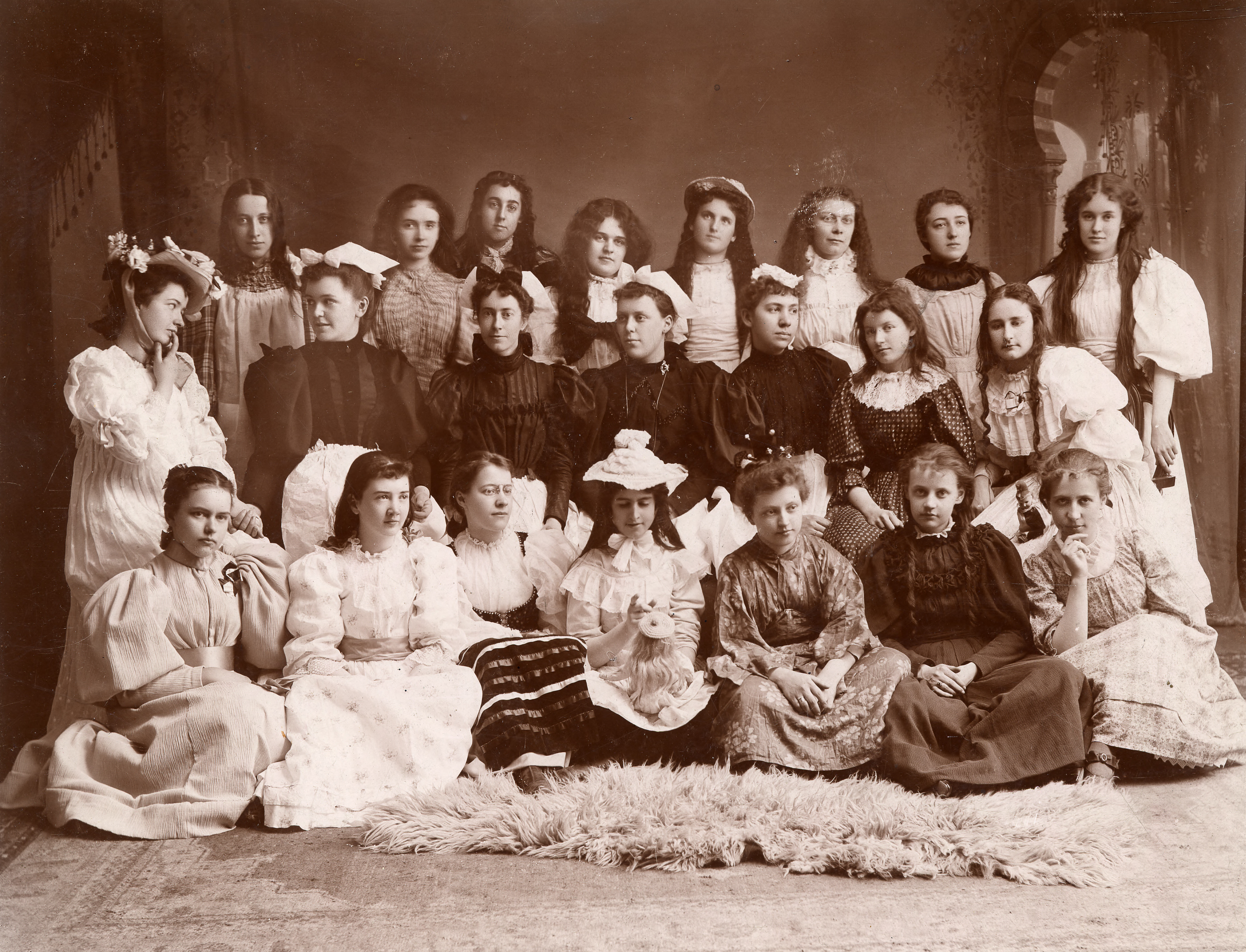
1894 incoming freshmen class

The founding of the Women's College Adjunct to Brown University in October 1891, later renamed the Women's College in Connection with Brown University, provided an organizational structure to allow women to attend that institution; Brown College remained as the men's college. The system resembled those at Columbia University (Columbia College for men and Barnard College for women) and Harvard University (Harvard College for men and Radcliffe College for women).

Brown's single-sex status had first been challenged in April 1874, when the university received an application from a woman. The Advisory and Executive Committee decided that admitting women at the time was not a good proposal, but they continued to revisit the matter annually until 1888. Subsequent discussions led to the creation of the Women's College on October 1, 1891.

The first women students were Maude Bonner, Clara Comstock, Nettie Goodale Murdoch, Elizabeth Peckham, Anne T. Weeden, and Mary Emma Woolley. Their classes were held at a grammar school that had once been associated with Brown. After the boys went home at two o’clock, the women arrived to learn from their professors in a classroom on the second floor. The school had no lights, so the women worked until the daylight was too dim to read by. One of the major advocates for admitting women to Brown University, Sarah Doyle, raised $75,000 to build the first permanent building for Brown's new female students; named Pembroke Hall, this structure would be renamed Pembroke College in 1928.

Official recognition of the college as a body of the university came in 1896. The college received its own faculty in 1903. By 1910, 40% of students were from outside Rhode Island.

=== Deans of Pembroke College ===
1892–1900	Louis Franklin Snow
1900–1905	Anne Crosby Emery
1905–1923	Lida Shaw King
1923–1950	Margaret Shove Morriss
1950–1961	Nancy Duke Lewis
1961–1971	Rosemary Pierrel

== Later history and coeducation ==
Pembroke Campus

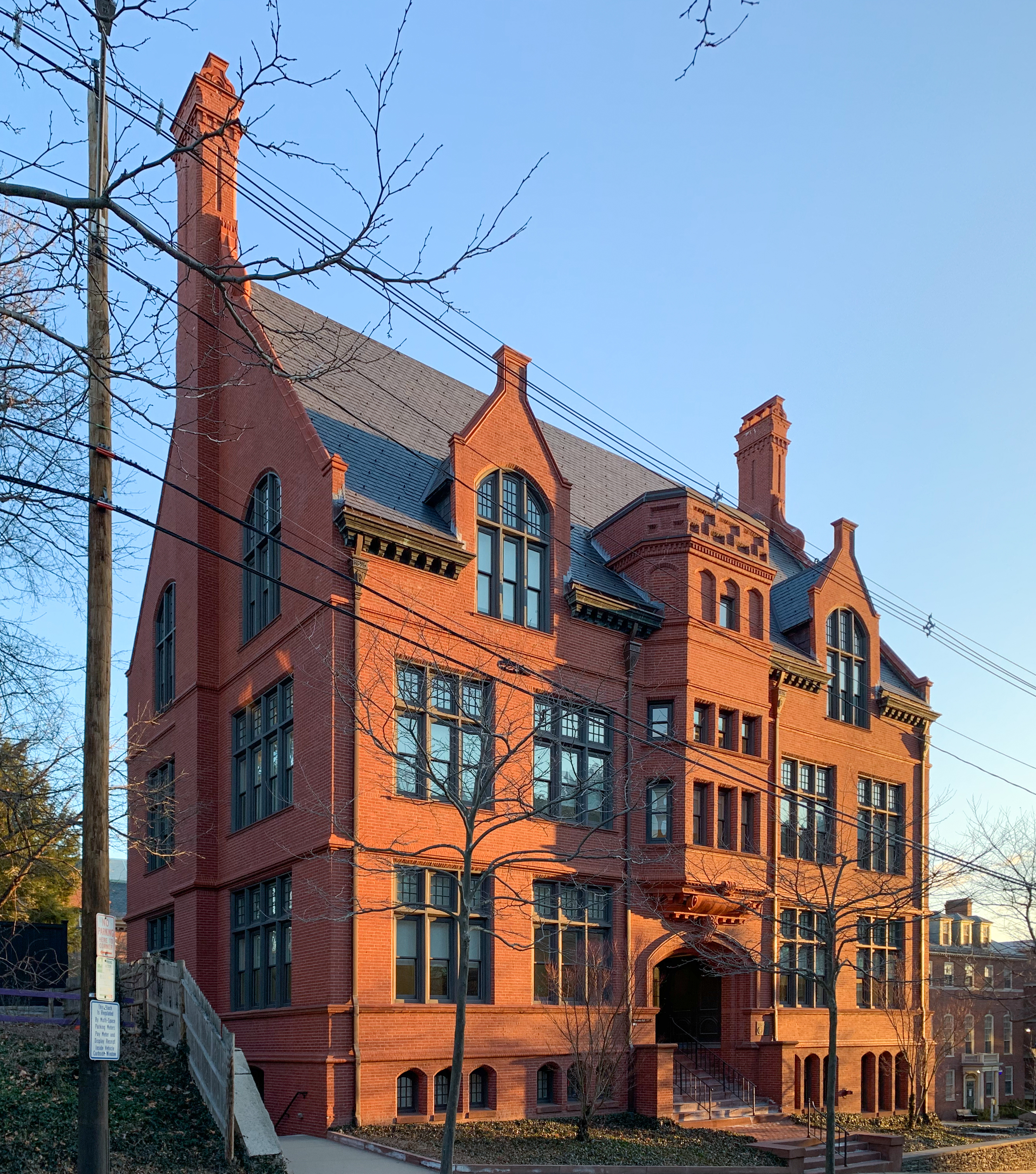
Pembroke Hall, first building of the Women's College (1897)

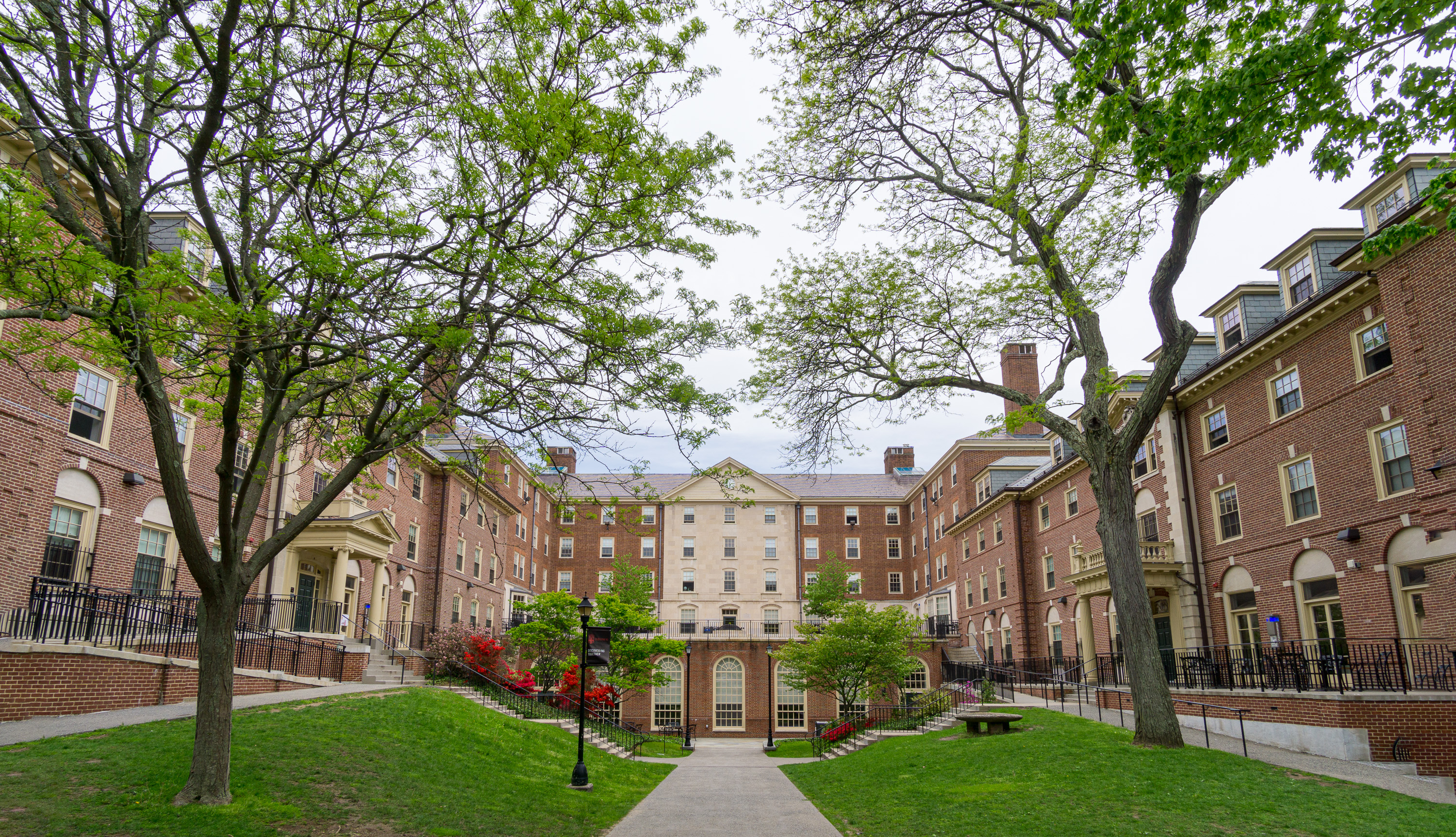
The three dormitories of Metcalf Hall (1919), Andrews Hall (1947), and Miller Hall (1910) formed the heart of Pembroke College

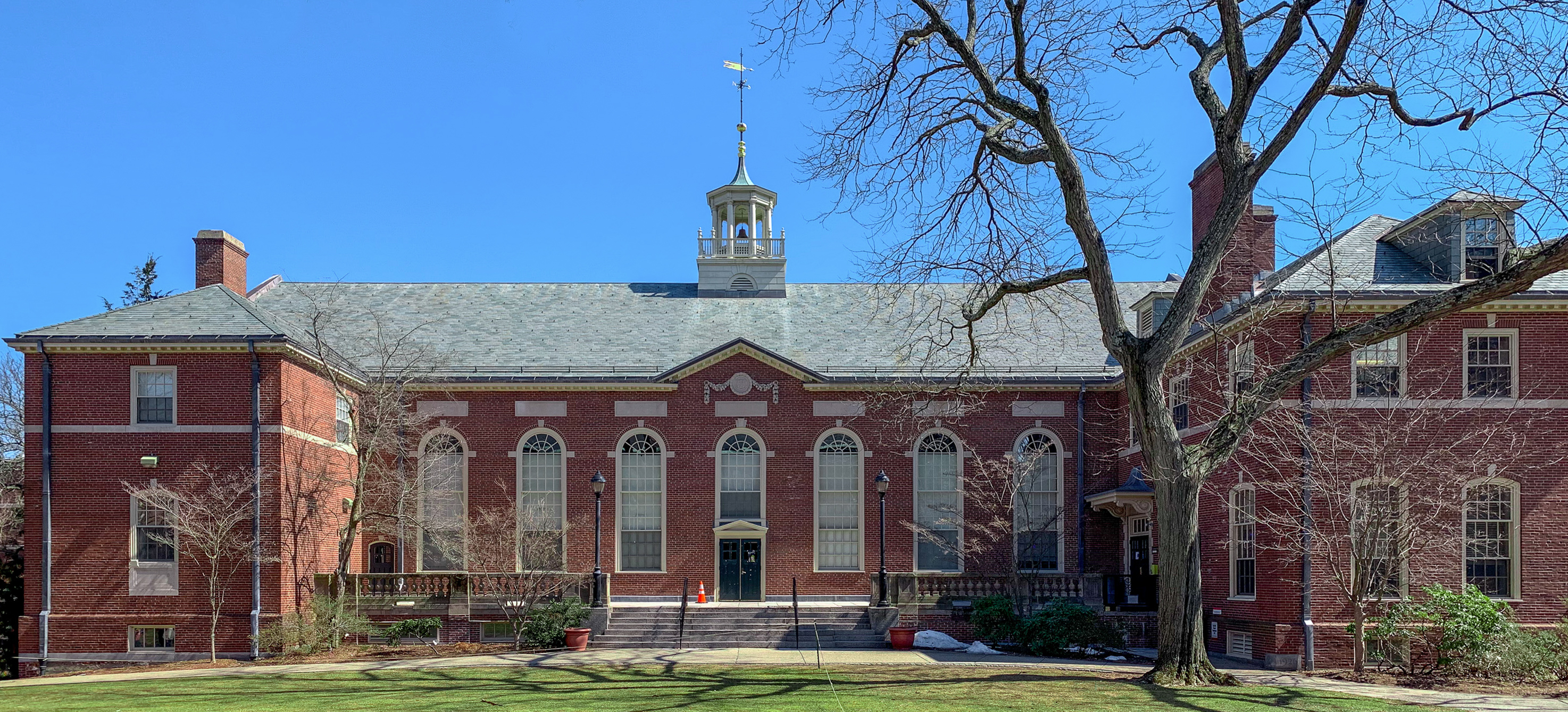
Alumnae Hall (1927)

In 1928, the Women's College was renamed "Pembroke College in Brown University" in honor of Pembroke College at the University of Cambridge in England. Roger Williams, one of the founders of Rhode Island, was an alumnus of Cambridge's Pembroke. Due to this, one of the buildings on Brown's campus had been named "Pembroke Hall." This was the building on the Brown campus where most "Pembrokers," as Women's College students were already known, attended classes. The Women's College had also already been using the coat of arms of Cambridge's Pembroke for formal decoration on programs and pins.

In 1931 Pembroke College began a nursing program with the Rhode Island Hospital Training School for Nurses to train women to teach in nursing school.

The "coordinate" status of Pembroke College was valued because it allowed women to take courses with Brown students yet still experience the characteristics of single-sex education. This included a separate student government, separate newspaper and separate social clubs.

In 1969, students from Pembroke and Brown began living in shared dormitories. Since women students had been attending classes and participating in extracurricular activities at Brown for some time, the Advisory and Executive Council proposed a merger between the colleges. On July 1, 1971, the merger became official, with all undergraduate students being admitted to and attending the same college.

In 1981, the Pembroke Center for Teaching and Research on Women was established at Brown, billing itself as a "center for interdisciplinary research on gender and society." Its mission also includes the preservation of the history of women at Brown. Affiliated with the Sarah Doyle Women's Center, it is home to the university's Gender Studies program and publishes the academic journal differences: A Journal of Feminist Cultural Studies. The Pembroke Center has also sponsored the digitization of the Pembroke College newspaper "The Pembroke Record" which can be accessed on line.

Although Brown became a fully coeducational institution with the merger, the history of women at Brown was still evolving. On September 3, 1991, Jill Ker Conway, the president of the all-female Smith College, delivered the opening convocation address to the student body in celebration of Brown's 100 years of women on campus. A four-day symposium was also held in October of that year in order to discuss women's issues, with President of Ireland Mary Robinson delivering the keynote address.

At the time of the merger, only 25% of the undergraduate students were women. By the 2005-2006 academic year, 51% of students at Brown University were female.

== Notable alumnae ==
The first graduates were Mary Emma Woolley and Anne Tillinghast Weeden in 1894. In early graduation programs, the names of the female graduates were listed in a special section below those of men. This list is in alphabetical order, by surname.

- Leah B. Allen (A.B. 1907) – Professor of Astronomy, Wellesley College, Hood College
- Elinor B. Bachrach (A.B. 1965) – Senior Fiscal Advisor, United States Agency for International Development (USAID)
- Charlotta Bass (did not graduate) – educator and civil rights activist known as the editor and publisher of the California Eagle. She was the first African-American woman nominated for one of the nation's two highest offices when she accepted the Progressive Party's nomination for vice president in the 1952 presidential election.
- Haiganush R. Bedrosian (A.B. 1965) – Chief Justice of the Rhode Island Family Court (2010–2016)
- Susan Bennett (A.B. 1971) – voice actress best known as the original American voice of Apple Inc.'s Siri
- Dana Buchman Farber (A.B. 1973) – fashion designer and activist
- Susan Cheever (A.B. 1965) – PEN New England Award-winning author and columnist
- Kitty Chen (A.B. 1966) – playwright and actress
- Lyn Crost (A.B 1938) – World War II correspondent and author
- Alice Drummond (A.B. 1950) – Tony Award-nominated actress
- Katherine G. Farley (A.B. 1971) – Chairwoman, Lincoln Center for the Performing Arts (2010–present)
- Kathryn S. Fuller (A.B. 1967) – Chair, The Ford Foundation (2004–2010)
- Laura Geller (A.B. 1971) – Senior Rabbi Emerita, Temple Emanuel
- Lillian Moller Gilbreth (Ph.D. 1915) – psychologist, industrial engineer, consultant, and educator
- Robin Green (A.B. 1967) – Primetime Emmy Award-winning writer and producer
- Penelope Hartland-Thunberg (A.B. 1940, PhD Hon.'66) – Member of the United States Tariff Commission (1965–1969); Federal Woman's Award recipient
- Marianne Hirsch (A.B. 1970, Ph.D. 1975) – William Peterfield Trent Professor of English and Comparative Literature, Columbia University; Professor, Institute for Research on Women, Gender, and Sexuality
- Constance Hunting (A.B. 1947) – poet and publisher
- Ruth Hussey (A.B. 1936) – Academy Award-nominated actress best known for her performance in The Philadelphia Story
- Judith Jacobson (A.B. 1964) – Associate Professor of Clinical Epidemiology, Columbia University Mailman School of Public Health
- Helen Johns (A.B. 1936) – retired competition swimmer, Olympic gold medalist, and former world record-holder
- Martha Sharp Joukowsky (A.B. 1958) – Professor of Archaeology, Brown University; co-founder, Brown's Joukowsky Institute for Archaeology and the Ancient World; President, Archaeological Institute of America (1989–1993)
- Lois Lowry (1958, LITTD '14Hon) – Newbery Medal-winning author best known for The Giver
- Linda Mason Aminoff (A.B. 1964) – Emmy Award-winning producer; Senior Vice President, CBS News (2005–2013)
- Martha K. Matzke (A.B. 1966) – co-founder and former executive editor, Education Week
- Emily Arnold McCully (A.B. 1961, LITTD 2002Hon) – Caldecott Medal-winning children's author and illustrator best known for Mirette on the High Wire
- Kristie Miller (A.B. 1966) – author of books on women and politics best known for C-SPAN's television series First Ladies: Influence & Image
- Catharine Theimer Nepomnyashchy (A.B. 1973, A.M. 1973) – Chair, Barnard College Slavic Department
- Albina Osipowich (A.B. 1933) – retired competition swimmer, Olympic gold medalist, and former world record-holder
- Maureen Paley (A.B. 1975) – contemporary art gallery owner
- Jane Pincus (A.B. 1959) – author best known for Our Bodies, Ourselves
- Eliza Greene Metcalf Radeke (A.B. 1914) – President, Rhode Island School of Design (1913–1931)
- Vicki Robin (A.B. 1967) – author best known for Your Money or Your Life
- Marilynne Robinson (A.B. 1966) – Pulitzer Prize-winning author
- Susan Salms-Moss (A.B. 1967) – opera soprano singer and translator
- Martha Sharp-Cogan (A.B. 1926) – humanitarian who, together with her first husband Waitstill Sharp, was one of only five Americans named Righteous Among the Nations by Yad Vashem for helping hundreds of Jews escape the Holocaust
- Leah Sprague (A.B. 1966) – Judge of the Newburyport Massachusetts District Court
- Wendy Strothman (A.B. 1972, LHD 2008) – former publisher at Beacon Press and Houghton Mifflin Harcourt
- Anna Canada Swain (A.B. 1911) – christian missionary and author known as Brown's first female trustee
- Gwyneth Walker (A.B. 1968) – composer and music educator
- Betsy West (A.B. 1973) – video journalist and Primetime Emmy Award-winning filmmaker; Senior Vice President, CBS News (1998–2005)
- JoBeth Williams (A.B. 1970) – actress and Academy Award-nominated filmmaker
- Mary Emma Woolley (A.B. 1894, M.A. 1895) – educator, peace and women's suffrage activist; President, Mount Holyoke College (1900–1937)
- Janet Yellen (A.B. 1967) – 78th U.S. Secretary of the Treasury (2021–2025); 15th Chair of the Federal Reserve (2014–2018); 18th Chair of the Council of Economic Advisers (1997–1999)
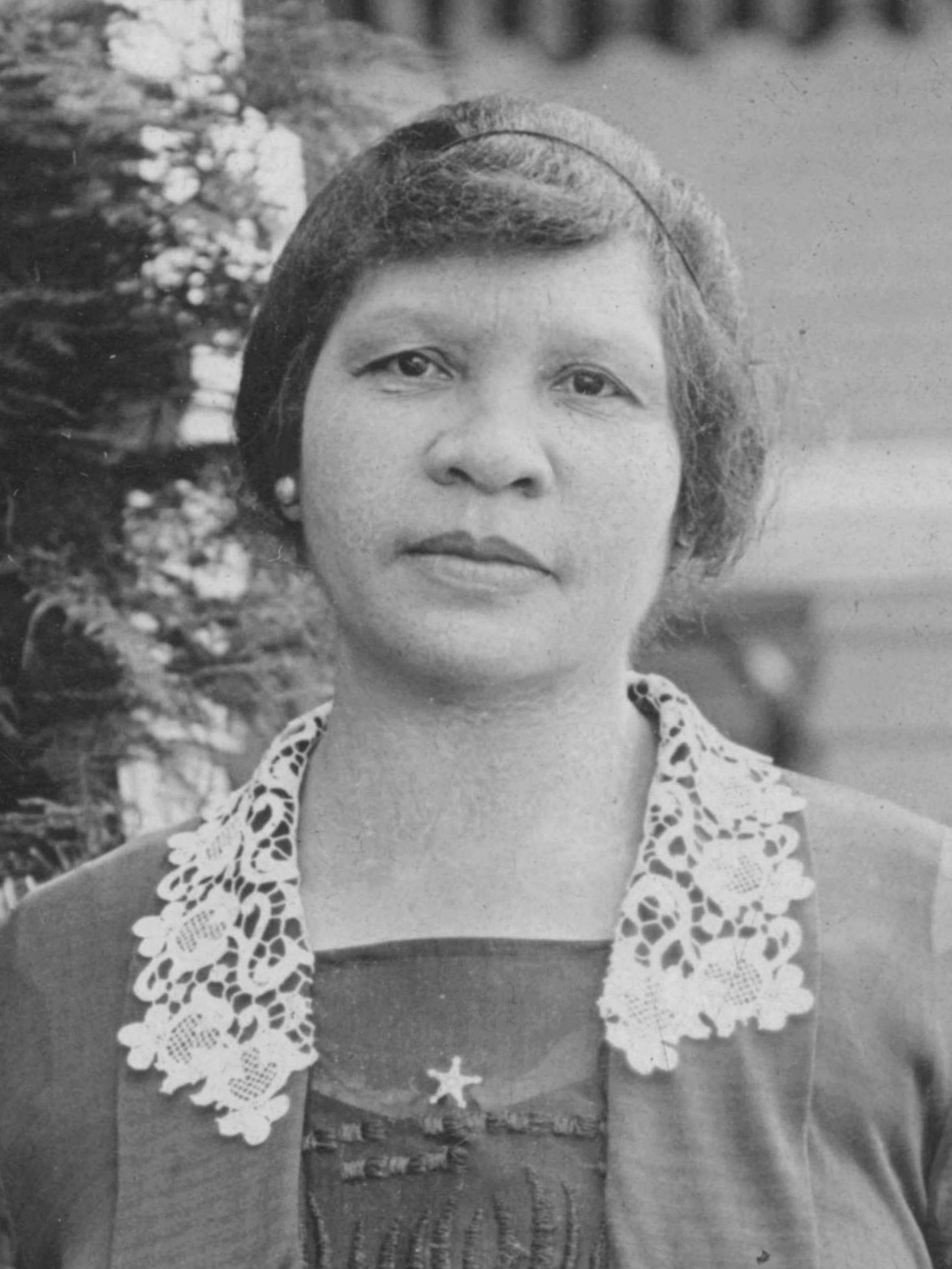
Charlotta Bass (attended, did not graduate)

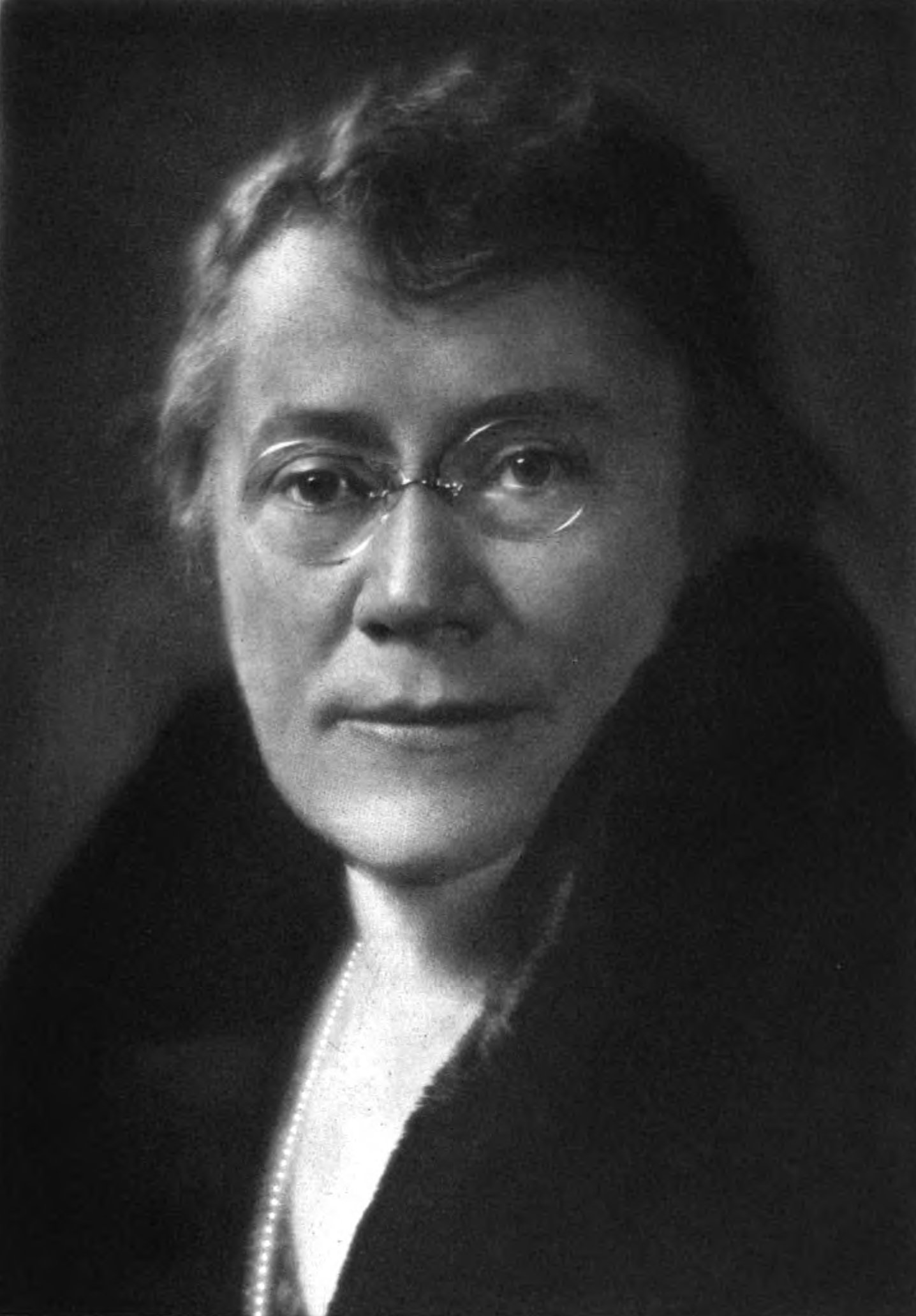
Mary Emma Woolley 1894

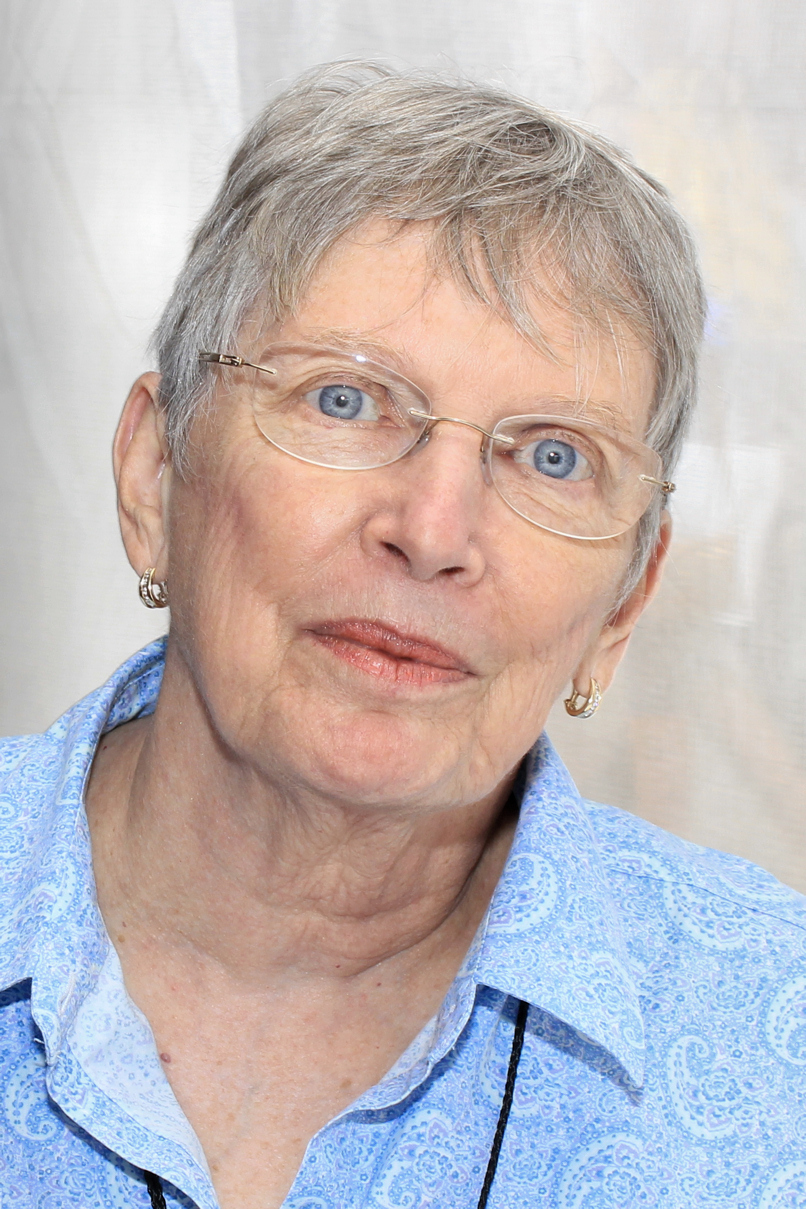
Lois Lowry '58

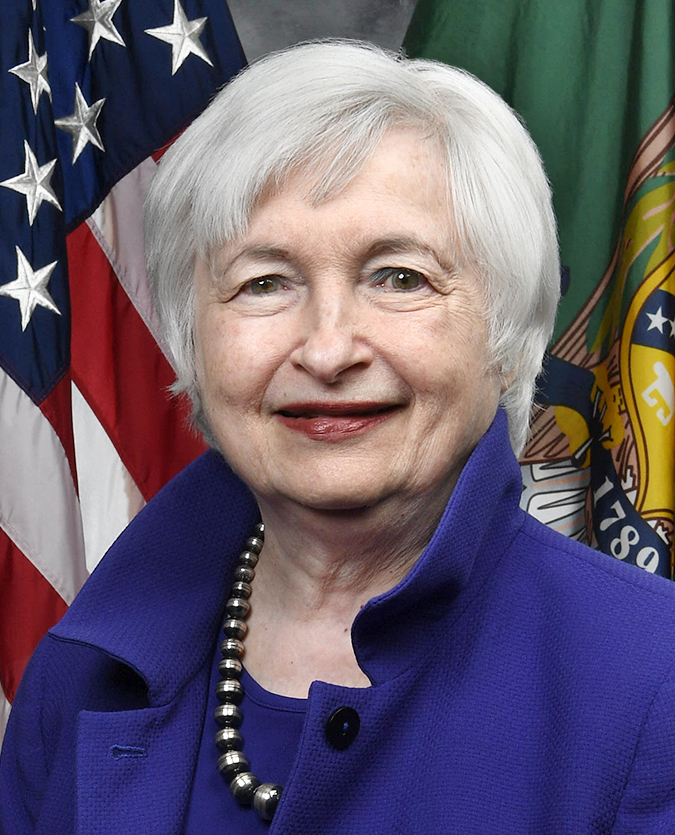
Janet Yellen '67

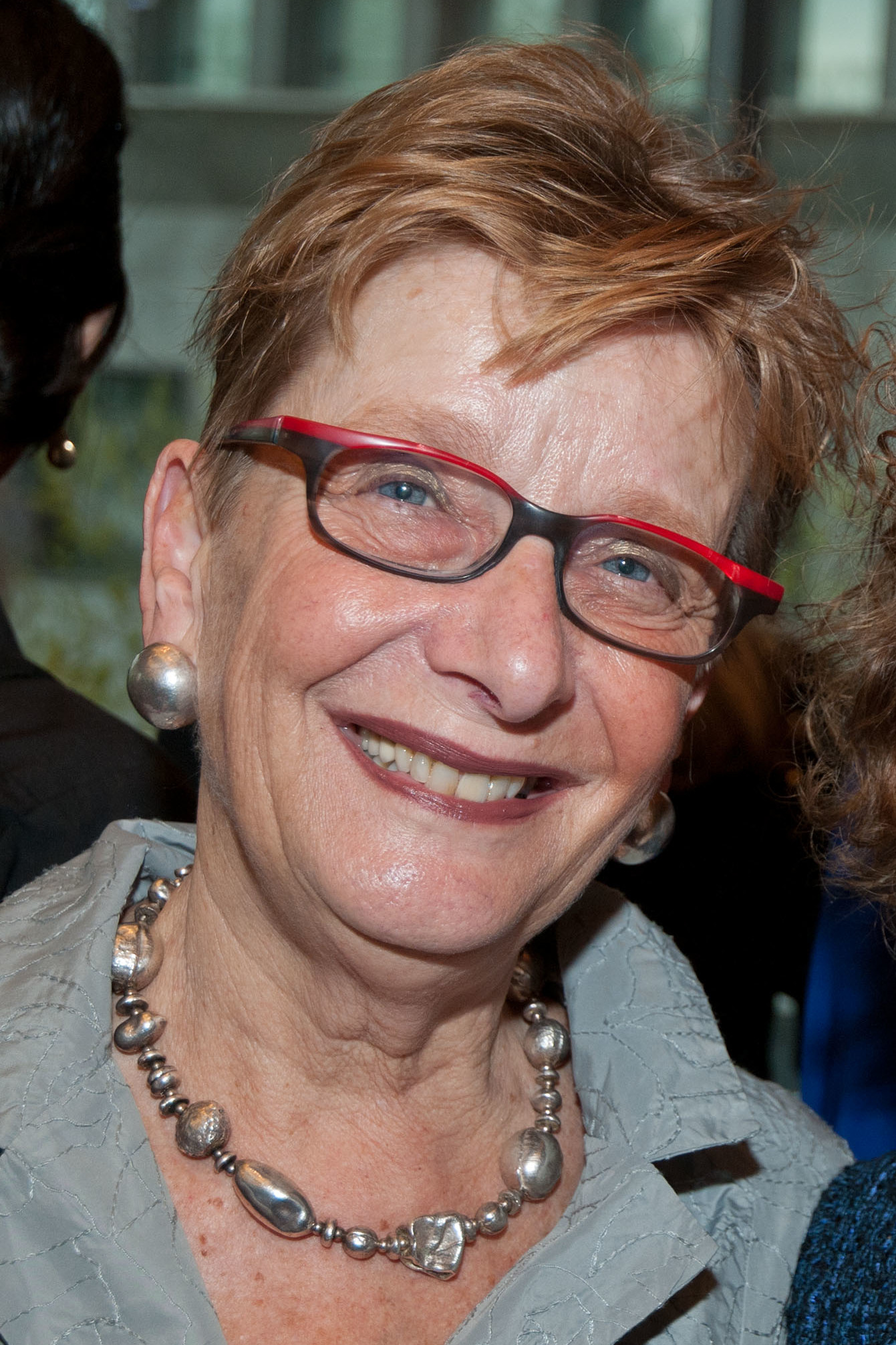
Marianne Hirsch '70
