= Brian Coogan (politician) =

Member of the Rhode Island House of Representatives

Member of the Rhode Island House of Representatives from the 83rd, 64th district
- In office 2000 – January 2005
- Succeeded by: Helio Melo

Personal details
- Born: 1970 (age 55–56)
- Party: Democratic
- Spouse: Heather Coogan

Brian G. Coogan is an American politician and a former Democratic member of the Rhode Island House of Representatives who represented District 83 followed by District 64 (after redistricting) from 2000 until January 2005. In the Rhode Island House, he served on the Committee on Corporations. Coogan also served on the East Providence City Council from 2008 to 2010.

== Biography ==
Coogan is a native of East Providence. While serving as a State Representative, Coogan was the witness to a bank robbery at an East Providence BankRI. Representative Coogan tailed the bank robber while on the phone with police until the suspect was apprehended.

In 2016, Coogan unsuccessfully sought election once again for District 64 after Helio Melo vacated the seat.

Since leaving state and municipal government, Coogan has transitioned into life in the private sector.

As a real estate investor, Coogan purchased the former Bovi's Tavern property, a former jazz club in East Providence. The area surrounding the former Bovi's, known as Six Corners, is currently under development with Coogan securing commercial, retail, and residential tenants. He rebranded Horton's Seafood, a family-run business into a restaurant serving Mexican fare called The Burrito Bowl.

=== Accquaintaince with Nicholas Alahverdian ===
Circa 2001 while serving in the Rhode Island House of Representatives, Coogan became acquainted with a fourteen-year-old working as a legislative page, Nicholas Alahverdian. Alahverdian was an outspoken detractor of the Rhode Island Department of Children, Youth & Families around Coogan and coworkers, claiming to have been sexually and physically abused within the system after being removed from abusive parents. Empathetic to Alahverdian's claims, Coogan discussed plans with his wife to adopt the teenager, but the Coogans recanted once Family Court Chief Judge Jeremiah S. Jeremiah warned Coogan that Alahverdian was mostly likely manipulating him; Alaverdian was removed from his mother's custody due to physically abusing her, his grandmother, and his siblings. Coogan quoted Jeremiah as saying "There is something really wrong with that kid. He will try to undermine you and turn your family upside-down." Coogan alleged that Alahverdian became hostile towards him following his reconsideration, in January 2022 telling The Providence Journal that “[Alahverdian] knew how to manipulate people. The kid swindled a lot of people. He got certain [state] reps to give him money and sometimes he threatened them. He knew how to play the ‘You touched me' card. He’d say, ‘I’ll tell people you raped me, you assaulted me’”, a claim supported by his former coworker Joanne Giannini.

In 2020, Alahverian would fake his death from non-Hodgkin lymphoma and flee to Scotland to avoid federal investigation into numerous charges including sexual assault and fraud. Alahverdian would be found and arrested in Glasgow December 2021, while receiving COVID-19 treatment under the alias Arthur Knight. Following announcement of Alahverdian's survival, Coogan would be questioned on his experiences with Alahverdian. In mid-February 2022, Coogan agreed with Sky News to set up a video call with "Knight" and a reporter; in the interview, Coogan confirmed the man (who claimed to not be Alahverdian nor know Coogan) as being Alahverdian. The reporter was able to confirm Coogan's statement that Alahverdian had a scar beside his right eye, but when Coogan further stated that Alahverdian had tattoos on his biceps of a barcode and a bird wing, "Knight" did not show his biceps and the video call was ended abruptly.
