= Jim Merkel =

American author and engineer

Jim Merkel (born 1957) is an American author and engineer, who moved from involvement in the military industry to advocating simple living. Since 1989, Merkel has dedicated himself to trying to reduce his personal impact on the environment and to encourage others to do the same.

Initially trained as an electrical engineer, Merkel spent twelve years designing industrial and military systems. After witnessing the devastation following the 1989 Exxon Valdez oil spill, however, he concluded that global problems had become so urgent as to require immediate action. He consequently quit his job and began a new career as an environmental activist and spokesman.

He claims to have lived on $5,000 a year (close to the global median income) for 16 years (ca. 1989 – 2005), later increasing to $10,000 per year. He founded the Alternative Transportation Task Force in San Luis Obispo, California and served briefly as an elected officer of the Sierra Club; he conducts approximately 60 workshops each year on sustainable living and "radical simplicity" in the United States, Canada, and Spain.

In 1994 he received an Earthwatch Gaia Fellowship, allowing him to visit Kerala, India, and parts of the Himalayas to research sustainable living. In 1995, he founded the Global Living Project and continues to serve as its co-director.

In April 2005, Dartmouth College appointed him its first Sustainability Director. He lives in Belfast, Maine.

== Bibliography ==
- Radical Simplicity: Small Footprints on a Finite Earth (2003)
