= Sue Bender =

American author (1933–2025)

Sue Bender (August 4, 1933 – August 3, 2025), born Marjorie Sue Rosenfeld, was an American author, ceramic artist, family therapist, and lecturer who lived in Berkeley, California. She wrote Plain and Simple: A Woman's Journey to the Amish, a best seller about her experience living among the Amish, published in 1989. Her subsequent books included Everyday Sacred and Stretching Lessons. She was called the "Grandma Moses of the simplicity movement". She graduated from Simmons College (BA), Harvard University (M.Ed), and the University of California, Berkeley (MSW).
