= Haiganush R. Bedrosian =

American judge

Chief Judge of the Rhode Island Family Court
- In office 2010 – January 8, 2016
- Nominated by: Gov. Donald L. Carcieri
- Succeeded by: Michael B. Forte

Personal details
- Born: June 14, 1943 (age 81); Cranston, Rhode Island, U.S.
- Education: Suffolk University Law School (JD)

Haiganush R. Bedrosian (born June 14, 1943) was the Chief Justice of the Rhode Island Family Court from 2010 until her retirement on January 8, 2016.

== Personal ==
Judge Bedrosian is the daughter of Armenian immigrants. She grew up in Cranston, Rhode Island and graduated from Pembroke College. Bedrosian then attended Suffolk University Law School in Boston, MA and acquired a juris doctor degree.

A widow, Judge Bedrosian has a stepson and daughter-in-law, two step-grandchildren and two step-great-grandchildren.

== Career ==
In Bedrosian's early career, she served as a law clerk to Rhode Island Supreme Court Justice Thomas J. Paolino. She was in private practice specializing in family law for several years after working as Assistant General Counsel to the Providence & Worcester Railroad Company. In the early 1970s, Bedrosian also worked as a Special Assistant Attorney General in the Criminal Prosecution Unit. Judge Bedrosian was instrumental in creating statewide standards for Guardian ad litem in Family Court cases.

After being nominated by Governor J. Joseph Garrahy and confirmed by the Rhode Island Senate, Bedrosian became the first female judge to serve on the Rhode Island Family Court in 1980.

Upon the retirement of longtime Chief Judge Jeremiah S. Jeremiah, Jr. on June 30, 2010, Bedrosian became the acting Chief as the senior associate judge of the Court. She was later appointed to serve in that position in a permanent capacity by Governor Donald Carcieri, and officially took the bench as Chief Judge after confirmation hearings and a vote from the Rhode Island Senate.

== Retirement ==
Bedrosian retired from the Family Court in January 2016. She was succeeded by Judge Michael Forte. She receives a yearly retirement pension of over $200,000.00.

== Professional associations ==
Bedrosian is a member of the Rhode Island Bar Association. She founded the Rhode Island Trial Judges Association and served as its president for several years.
