= Constance Hunting =

American poet and publisher (1925–2006)

Constance Hunting (1925 – April 5, 2006) was an American poet and publisher, widely known in the Northeastern United States. She taught English literature and creative writing at the University of Maine at Orono until her death on April 5, 2006.

Hunting received her B.A. from Pembroke College in Brown University in 1947, studied at Duke University from 1950 to 1953, and then lived in West Lafayette, Indiana, home of Purdue University, until 1968. From that time, she lived in Orono, Maine, with her husband Robert, who was chair of the English department at UMO until his retirement.

Hunting trained as a classical pianist, but is best known for her work as a poet, and her promotion of other Maine writers through the Puckerbrush Review literary magazine, which she established in 1971. She was also the founder and editor of Puckerbrush Press, which, over the twenty-eight years of its existence, published a great variety of work by many writers, domestic and international, including May Sarton, James Kelman, Angelica Garnett, and other figures from the Bloomsbury Group.

== Works ==
- After the Stravinsky Concert and Other Poems (1969)
- Cimmerian and Other Poems (1972)
- Beyond the Summerhouse: A Narrative Poem (1976) ISBN 978-0913006108
- Nightwalk and Other Poems (1980) ISBN 978-0891010418
- Dream Cities (1982)
- Collected Poems 1969–1982 (1983) ISBN 978-0915032440
- A Day at the Shore: A Poem (1983)
- Between the Worlds: Poems 1983–1988 (1989) ISBN 978-0913006436
- Hawkedon (1990) ISBN 978-0913006450
- The Myth of Horizon (1991) ISBN 978-1559210447
- At Rochebonne: A Poem (1994)
- The Shape of Memory (1998) ISBN 978-0913006689
- Natural Things: Collected Poems 1969–1998 (1999) ISBN 978-0943373607
- An Amazement (2002)
- The Sky Flower (2005) ISBN 978-0913006825

Her papers are currently housed at the Howard Gotlieb Archival Research Center at Boston University.
