= Helio Melo =

American politician

Member of the Rhode Island House of Representatives from the 64th district
- In office January 2005 – January 2017
- Preceded by: Brian Coogan
- Succeeded by: Helder Cunha

Personal details
- Born: January 10, 1968 (age 58)
- Party: Democratic
- Education: University of Rhode Island
- Website: heliomelo.com

Helio Melo (born January 10, 1968) is a former American politician and a Democratic member of the Rhode Island House of Representatives representing District 64 from January 2005 until 2017. He did not seek reelection in 2016. "

== Education ==
Melo attended the University of Rhode Island.

== Elections ==
- 2004 Melo challenged District 64 incumbent Representative Brian Coogan in the four-way September 14, 2004 Democratic Primary, winning with 970 votes (62.1%) and won the three-way November 2, 2004 General election with 3,274 votes (70.4%) against Republican nominee Michael Robinson and Independent candidate Julie Silva.
- 2006 Melo was unopposed for both the September 12, 2006 Democratic Primary, winning with 877 votes and the November 7, 2006 General election, winning with 3,767 votes.
- 2008 Melo was unopposed for both the September 9, 2008 Democratic Primary, winning with 602 votes and the November 4, 2008 General election, winning with 4,102 votes.
- 2010 Melo was unopposed for both the September 23, 2010 Democratic Primary, winning with 972 votes and won the November 2, 2010 General election with 2,847 votes.
- 2012 Melo was unopposed for both the September 11, 2012 Democratic Primary, winning with 1,227 votes and also the November 6, 2012 General election, winning with 3,773 votes.
- 2014 Melo was unopposed in the Democratic primary on September 9, 2014. He defeated Republican Robert Botelho in the general election on November 4, 2014, with 2,137 votes (75.8%).

Preceded by Brian Coogan	Representative, Rhode Island House of Representatives; District 64; 2005 - 2017	Succeeded by Helder Cunha
