= Lyn Crost =

- Born: 1915; Brooklyn, New York
- Occupation: Journalist
- Known for: Journalist covering Japanese-Americans in WWII, author of "Honor by Fire"

Lyn Crost (1915 in Brooklyn, New York – 1997 in Washington, D.C.) was a World War II correspondent and author.

== Education ==
Eleanor Elizabeth Crost, who was known professionally as Lyn Crost, was born in Brooklyn, New York on September 19, 1915, the daughter of Maurice Roland Crost and Eleanor Agnes Welch. Maurice Crost was born in Amsterdam, the Netherlands, and had attended City College of New York for two years before meeting Eleanor Agnes Welch, who was from Hartford, Connecticut.

Lyn Crost was raised in Hartford, Connecticut and entered Pembroke College in Brown University in September, 1934. She received an A.B. in Social Studies from Pembroke College in 1938. She was elected to Phi Beta Kappa and graduated magna cum laude.

== Work ==
=== Early career ===
After graduation, she traveled to Hawaii to visit an aunt in 1939. While in Hawaii, she found a job with Dr. James Shoemaker, who was conducting a study on labor conditions in Hawaii for the U.S. Bureau of Labor Statistics. She subsequently worked as a reporter for the Honolulu Advertiser.

=== Foreign correspondent ===
Just a few months before the Japanese attack on Pearl Harbor in 1941, Crost returned to Washington, D.C. where she worked in the Executive Office of the President of the United States and later with the Associated Press (AP) covering the proceedings of Congress. As an AP correspondent in Washington, she interviewed Joseph R. Farrington of the Honolulu Star-Bulletin and Hawaii's delegate to the United States Congress. Farrington offered her a position as the European correspondent covering the 100th Infantry Battalion (United States) 442nd Regimental Combat Team, an all Japanese-American unit, known as “do or die” and the most decorated unit in U.S. military history. One of the few female reporters during World War II, she followed this unit until the war ended in 1945

=== Post-war career ===
After the war, she became the paper's Washington correspondent and later served as a special assistant at the White House during the Dwight Eisenhower administration.

In 1987, while following the Congressional debate on granting reparations (transitional justice) to Japanese Americans who were interned in detention camps during the war, she became inspired to tell the story of the Nisei who served in the U.S. Armed Forces Military Intelligence during World War II as translators and interrogators.

As a result, she wrote Honor by Fire:Japanese Americans at War in Europe and the Pacific, published in 1994, Royalties from the book were donated to a "Brothers in Valor" monument, which was erected at Fort DeRussy (Hawaii) to commemorate the Nisei who had served with the 100th Infantry Battalion, the 442nd Regimental Combat Team, the Military Intelligence Service and the 1399th Construction Engineers' Battalion (Seabees) who worked in Hawaii.

After completing Honor by Fire, Crost helped the “Smithsonian National Museum of American History” assemble an exhibit on the experiences of Japanese Americans during the war. Her correspondent's uniform, Hermes typewriter, portrait, and war dispatches are today part of the permanent exhibit.

== Personal ==
She was married in 1946 to Edward Kennedy, an AP war correspondent. They had a daughter, Julia Kennedy. In 1955 she married Thomas W. Stern, a retired geologist. She died in 1997 from a brain tumor.
