= Judith Jacobson =

Epidemiologist

Judith Jacobson is Associate Professor of Clinical Epidemiology at the Columbia Mailman School of Public Health.

== Education ==
Jacobson is a 1964 graduate of Pembroke College in Brown University. She holds an MBA, MPH, and DrPH from Columbia University.

== Career ==
Jacobson’s major research interests are cancer, asthma, and the role of behavior, including the use of complementary/alternative medicine, in the prevention and control of these conditions. She and colleagues collaborated on studies of factors associated with cancer outcomes in national data and decision analyses of breast cancer prevention strategies, and on clinical trials of an herbal agent to control hot flashes in breast cancer patients and vitamin supplementation to prevent DNA damage in heavy smokers.

== Support for Israel ==
Jacobson is a co-founder of Scholars for Peace in the Middle East and is frequently quoted in the press on the issue of anti-Israel campus activity. In opposing a proposed visit to campus by Mahmoud Ahmadinejad, Jacobson told The New York Times that neither academic freedom nor free speech required Columbia to “give a podium to anyone who wants it, let alone a Hitler wannabe who has actively suppressed academic freedom in his own country.”

She told reporters that members of the Columbia faculty are afraid to speak when colleagues unfairly treat students who support Israel, because they do not want to risk ostracism and jeopardize their careers. She claimed, "Some faculty members are afraid to come out and express support for Israel's right to exist, and some feel they've been penalized and isolated for doing so."

"In the past three years," Jacobson told the Washington Times in 2005, "we've come to realize that we are confronting a pervasive loss of integrity in the academy. What has recently been termed the Palestinianization of the academy is not support for the Palestinians (we would not have a problem with that because we are both pro-Israel and pro-Palestinian, and no, that is not an oxymoron), but an obsessive focus on Israel's 'crimes,' and unfounded charges of racism, apartheid, and genocide directed at Israel."
