= Susan Salms-Moss =

American opera singer

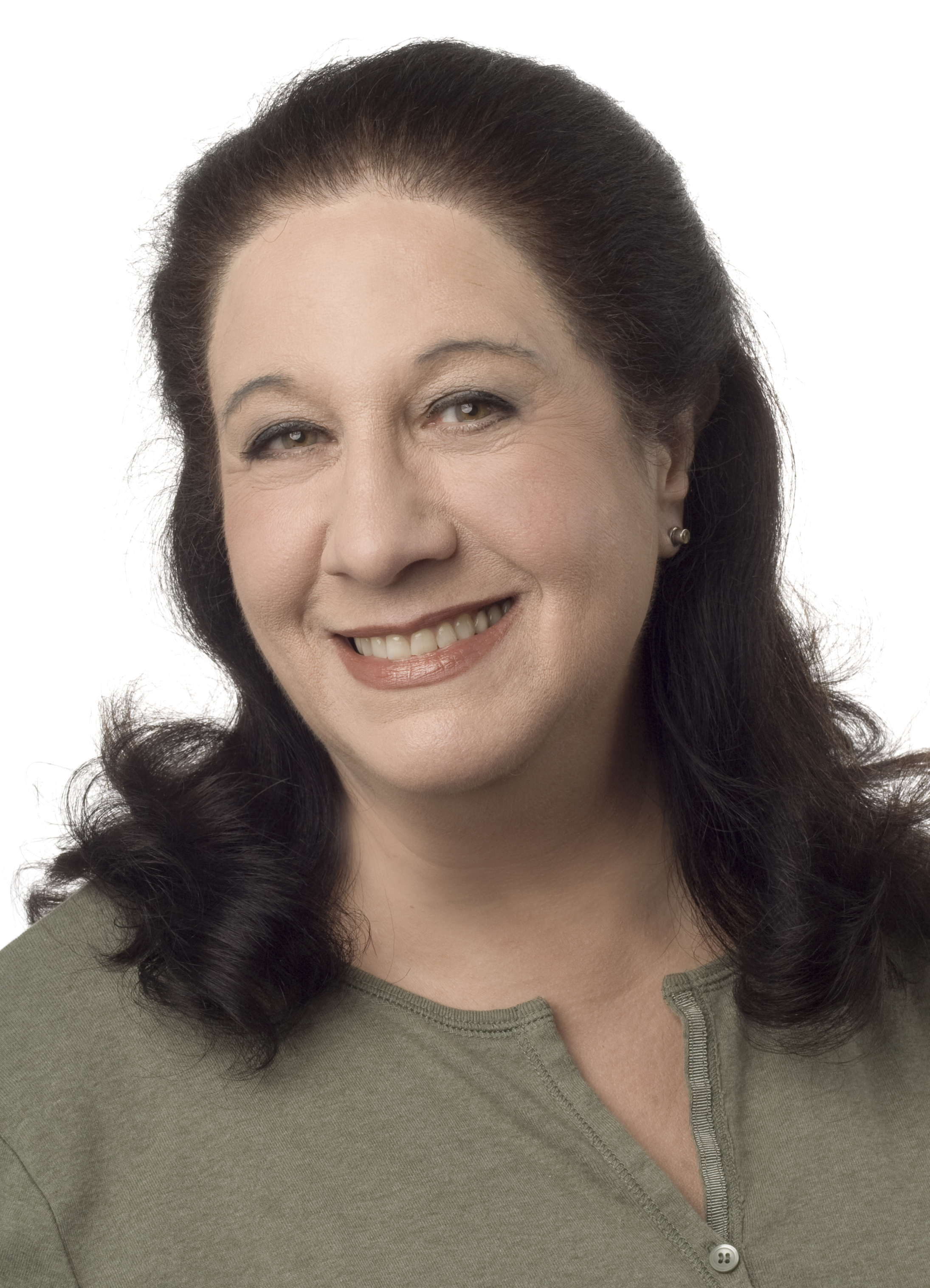
Susan Salms-Moss

Susan Salms-Moss (born Susan Leslie Moss, April 28, 1946) is an American opera singer who made her career singing leading soprano roles in Europe. She appeared in numerous theaters in Germany, and throughout Europe, and is best known in dramatic soprano roles.

After beginning her career in 1977 in Germany, Salms-Moss joined the Städtische Bühnen in Regensburg, where she performed from 1986 to 1999 while continuing to accept contracts elsewhere in Germany and throughout Europe. Her roles have ranged from Mozart to Puccini, Verdi, Strauss, Janáček, Rimsky-Korsakov, Debussy and Berg. Her concert programs included works especially in the French and Russian repertoire.

== Biography ==
=== Early life and education ===
Salms-Moss was born on April 28, 1946, in Brooklyn, New York, the daughter of Louis B. Moss, a manufacturer, and Dorris Teicher Moss, a homemaker. Her mother's family stemmed from near Lviv, then part of the Austro-Hungarian Empire, and her father's family came from Odessa and the surrounding countryside. Both sides of the family are Ukrainian Jewish. She grew up on Long Island and graduated from Great Neck South High School in 1963. In 1967, she earned her B.A. from Brown University, where she majored in French literature. At the same time, she studied voice and performed in concerts and on stage (e.g. Polly in The Threepenny Opera).

After college, Salms-Moss moved to New York City and worked as part of a research project in foreign language teaching and testing methods at the Modern Language Association, while continuing to study voice privately, especially with Else Seyfert. Conductor Laszlo Halasz, founding music director of New York City Opera, encouraged Salms-Moss to go to Geneva, Switzerland, in 1968, and study with Maria Carpi, best known for having trained soprano Gwyneth Jones. The year of music studies at the Conservatoire de Genève convinced Salms-Moss to pursue a career in opera. In 1977, she earned a music degree, with distinction, at the Musikhochschule Rheinland (then called Robert-Schumann-Institut) in Düsseldorf, Germany, where she studied with Wagnerian soprano Astrid Varnay.

=== Career ===
Salms-Moss made her professional opera debut, in the autumn of 1977, as the leading soprano at the Städtische Bühnen (State Theatre) in Münster, Germany; where her first role was Amelia in Verdi's Un ballo in maschera, and she repeated the role in 1988. Other early roles included Mimi and Musetta in La Bohème (1978), Marguerite in Faust (1978–1979), Violetta in La Traviata (1979), Tatiana in Eugene Onegin and the Countess in The Marriage of Figaro (1980). Her career took her to numerous theaters in Germany in the following years. From 1986 until 1999 she was a member of the Städtische Bühnen in Regensburg, Germany, while continuing to accept contracts throughout Europe, including at the Vienna Volksoper. She played the title role in Bellini's Norma (1987). Her other Mozart roles included Fiordiligi in Cosi fan tutte (1990), another run of the Countess in Figaro (1991), and Donna Elvira in Don Giovanni (1994). She sang the Verdi heroines in Aida (1986, 1987 and 1988), Leonora in La Forza del Destino (1993), Desdemona in Otello (1994), Leonora in Il Trovatore (1995), Alice in Falstaff (1996 and 1997), and Abigaille in Nabucco (1997 and 2001).

Her Puccini roles included the title character in Tosca (1989, 1990 and 1991) and Giorgetta in Il Tabarro (1990). She has played all three Janáček heroines, Katya Kabanova (1989), and Emilia Marty in The Makropoulos Case (1993) and the title character in Jenufa (1994). Ventures into modern repertoire included Fevronia in Rimsky-Korsakov's The Legend of the Invisible City of Kitezh (1994), Marie in Berg's Wozzeck (1997), and Die Dame in Hindemith's Cardillac (1988). Rare departures into traditionally mezzo-soprano repertoire were Mélisande in Debussy's Pelléas et Mélisande (1990 and 1991) and Weir's Blond Eckbert (1996). Roles in lighter pieces included Rosalinde in Die Fledermaus (1979, 1980, 1984, 1985, 1991 and 1992), and the Mother Abbess in The Sound of Music in Innsbruck in the first Austrian production (1996). She performed the major works of Richard Strauss, such as Salome (1999), the Feldmarschallin in Der Rosenkavalier (1993), and, having sung Chrysothemis in Elektra in 1987, she played the title role in 1998. She also played Katerina in Shostakovich's Lady Macbeth of Mtsensk (1992 and 1995). Salms-Moss's concert programs included works in several languages and styles, in particular the French and Russian repertoire.

Salms-Moss became fluent in French, German, Italian and Russian, in addition to her native English. Parallel with her singing career, she translated German texts into English, including a number of full-length books, and was a member of the international translating group ExperTeam; since retiring from opera, she has worked as a freelance translator based in New York and coached singers in the German repertoire.

== Critical reputation ==
Of her Leonora in La Forza del Destino, the reviewer of the Mittelbayerische Zeitung wrote: "The Evening belonged to Susan Salms-Moss above all. ... This was an interpretation of the role in which every note was fascinating – in a balance of dramatic grandeur and lyric delicacy. ... [T]he sensitive interpretation she shaped with her rich, flowing voice – from the finely differentiated dynamics of the pace exhortations to the desperately imploring final gesture." A 1993 review of Rosenkavalier in the same newspaper said: "From Norma to Elektra, during the past few years, [Salms-Moss] has personified almost all of the great, tragic female roles. Heart and mind, musical and dramatic intelligence, are united in this artist. ... Her concentrated mezza di voce, the way she develops an arioso feeling on a single breath, are simply wonderful. ... She is moved herself and is thus able to move the audience as well." A review the same year in Der neue Tag commented: "Salms–Moss portrays all the facets of this phantasmal and yet real creature [Emilia] – from her weariness of life and oversatiation to her bitter irony, assuming sadistic traits in the way she deals with men. Salms-Moss is a femme fatale, a man-eating monster and a dramatic heroine at the same time." The critic of Die Woche wrote in 1997 of her performance in Nabucco: "Her Abigaille is a donna di forza, strong in expression and intensely sung – listen to the octave jumps in "Qual Dio vi salva" – she carries out this delicate role with bravura."

== Personal ==
Salms-Moss was married to Karl-Heinz Salms, a German interior designer, from 1974 to 2009, and has two daughters, who have performed with her on stage. She resides in New York City.
