= Vicki Robin =

American writer

- Born: Victoria Marie Robin; July 6, 1945 (age 81); Okmulgee, Oklahoma, U.S.
- Education: Pembroke College, Brown University (B.A.), 1967
- Occupations: Writer, speaker
- Writing career
- Subject: Personal finance
- Notable work: Your Money or Your Life

Vicki Robin (born July 6, 1945) is an American writer and speaker. She is best known as the author of Your Money Or Your Life: 9 Steps to Transforming Your Relationship with Money and Achieving Financial Independence.

== Early life ==
Robin was born in Oklahoma, but grew up in Long Island, New York and attended Manhasset Secondary School, where she was a member of the Leaders Club and selected as "most likely to succeed" in the high school class of 1963. She graduated from Brown University in 1967 and initially pursued a career as an actress, appearing as an extra in the soap operas Love of Life and The Secret Storm. Robin quickly became disillusioned with the industry. At the age of 23, she received an inheritance from her grandmother in the amount of $20,000 (equivalent to $137,287 in 2024). Soon thereafter, she quit her budding career to embark on a road trip across the United States and Mexico. During her travels, she met Joe Dominguez, a former Wall Street financial analyst who in 1969 retired at the age of 31 having saved about $100,000 (equivalent to $877,949 in 2025) during his brief career. They would become lifelong friends.

== Your Money or Your Life ==
Brought about by a desire to pursue intentional living, Robin and Joe Dominguez experimented with frugality and simple living and found it was possible to live on a fraction of the money spent by a typical household. Furthermore, paid work could be avoided entirely with a modest nest egg providing the required income. They supported themselves financially by investing in long-term treasury bonds and using the interest payments to cover living expenses. Without the need for a job, they spent their time supporting environmental and charitable causes. Those they worked with inevitably became curious about how the two managed financially. Reflecting on their process, they observed that they took nine steps to reach their financial independence goal – and thus the nine-step program in Your Money or Your Life was born.

The popularity of this subject led to Robin and Dominguez speaking at hundreds of "financial independence" workshops. To keep up with demand, a recorded version of the workshop was produced and distributed on cassette tape in 1986 followed by the book Your Money Or Your Life in 1992. Following an appearance on The Oprah Winfrey Show, the book became a best seller with over 600,000 copies sold. Including revised editions published in 1998, 2008 and 2018, Your Money or Your Life has sold over a million copies.

== Later life ==
The success of Your Money or Your Life resulted in Robin being associated with the voluntary simplicity movement. She appeared in the 1998 documentary film Escape from Affluenza. After moving to Whidbey Island in 1996, she became involved with the local community and in 2010 undertook a month-long experiment in local eating where she tried to eat only food produced within a 10-mile radius of her home. She chronicled her experiences in a book titled Blessing the Hands That Feed Us: What Eating Closer to Home Can Teach Us About Food, Community, and Our Place on Earth.

Robin has been mentioned as a source of inspiration for the FIRE movement. This has renewed interest in Your Money or Your Life and she is once again active in the personal finance scene. She is currently the host of the podcast "What Could Possibly Go Right?"
