= Simple living =

Simplified, minimalistic lifestyle

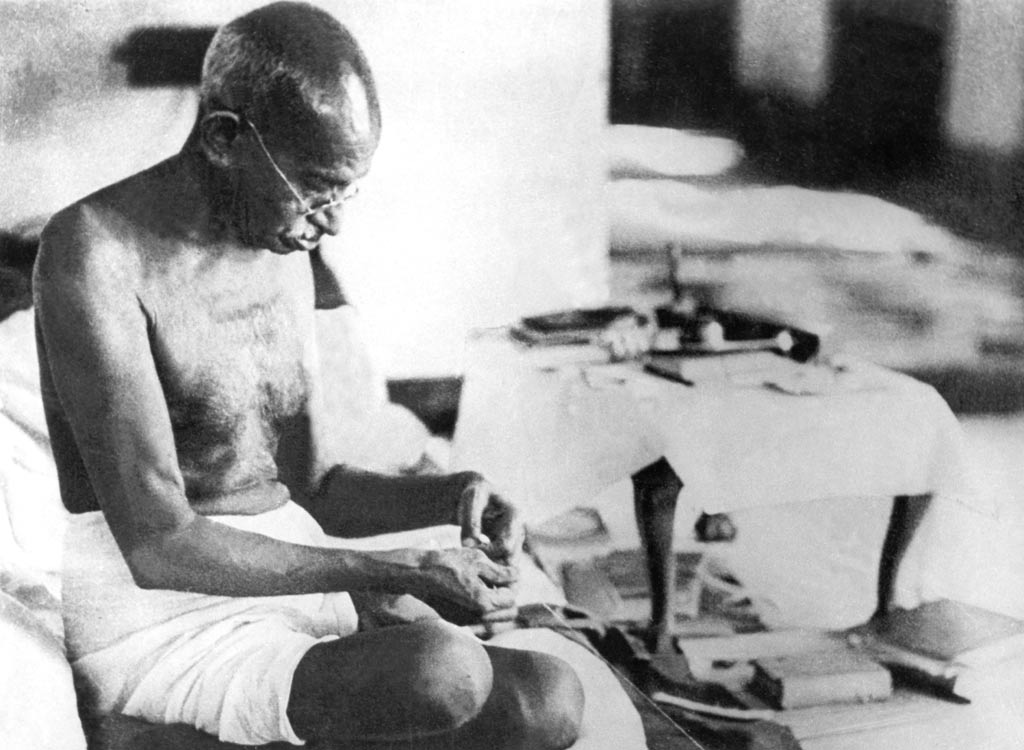
Mahatma Gandhi spinning yarn in 1942. Gandhi believed in a life of simplicity and self-sufficiency.

Simple living refers to practices that promote simplicity in one's lifestyle. Common practices of simple living include reducing the number of possessions one owns, depending less on technology and services, ascetism, and spending less money. In addition to such external changes, simple living also reflects a person's mindset and values. Simple living practices can be seen in history, religion, art, and economics.

Adherents may choose simple living for a variety of personal reasons, such as spirituality, health, increase in quality time for family and friends, work–life balance, personal taste, financial sustainability, increase in philanthropy, frugality, environmental sustainability, or reducing stress. Simple living can also be a reaction to economic materialism and consumer culture. Some cite sociopolitical goals aligned with environmentalist, anti-consumerist, or anti-war movements, including conservation, degrowth, deep ecology, and tax resistance.

== History ==
=== Religious and spiritual ===
A number of religious and spiritual traditions encourage simple living. Early examples include the Śramaṇa traditions of Iron Age India and biblical Nazirites. These traditions were heavily influenced by both national cultures and religious ethics. Simplicity was one of the primary concepts espoused by Lao Tzu, the founder of Taoism. This is most embodied in the principles of Pu and Ziran. Confucius has been quoted numerous times as promoting simple living.

Gautama Buddha espoused simple living as a central virtue of Buddhism. The Four Noble Truths advocate detachment from desire as the path to ending suffering and attaining Nirvana. The Buddhist presence in present day Asia has made a significant contribution towards welfare and sustainability. Government led Buddhist organizations such as the National Office of Buddhism in Thailand have integrated Buddhist values into its goals regarding sustainable development and lifestyle.

Jesus is said to have lived a simple life. He is said to have encouraged his disciples "to take nothing for their journey except a staff—no bread, no bag, no money in their belts—but to wear sandals and not put on two tunics". He also told his disciples that they cannot serve God and money at the same time, and explained that God is capable of providing them with the essentials for life (food and clothing), so long as they "seek his kingdom first". The Apostle Paul taught that people should be content with food and clothing, and that the desire to be rich is the cause of many kinds of evils.

Many other notable religious individuals, such as Benedict of Nursia, Francis of Assisi, Leo Tolstoy, Rabindranath Tagore, Albert Schweitzer, and Mahatma Gandhi, have claimed that spiritual inspiration led them to a simple living lifestyle.

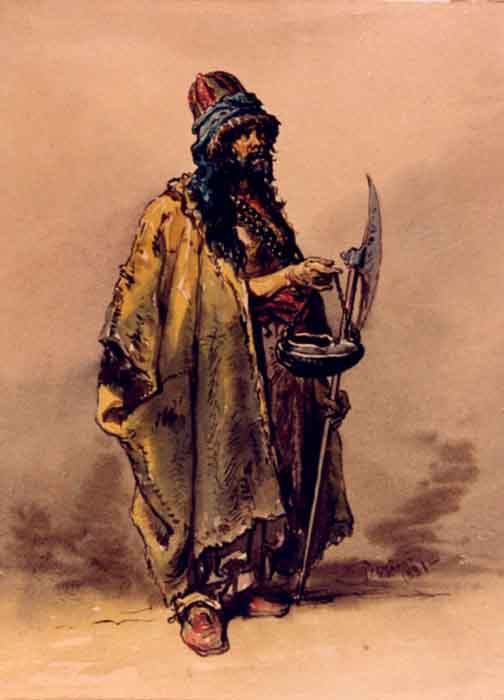
Ottoman Dervish portrayed by Amedeo Preziosi, 1860s circa, Muzeul Naţional de Artă al României

Sufism in the Muslim world emerged and grew as a mystical, somewhat hidden tradition in the mainstream Sunni and Shia denominations of Islam. Sufism grew particularly in the frontier areas of Islamic states, where the asceticism of its fakirs and dervishes appealed to populations already used to the monastic traditions of Hinduism, Buddhism, and Christianity. Sufis were influential and successful in spreading Islam between the 10th and 19th centuries. Some scholars have argued that Sufi Muslim ascetics and mystics played a decisive role in converting the Turkic peoples to Islam, mainly because of the similarities between the extreme, ascetic Sufis (fakirs and dervishes) and the Shamans of the traditional Turco-Mongol religion.

Plain people typically belonged to Christian groups that practised lifestyles that excluded forms of wealth or technology for religious or philosophical reasons. Such Christian groups include the Shakers, Mennonites, Amish, Hutterites, Amana Colonies, Bruderhof, Old German Baptist Brethren, Harmony Society, and some Quakers. A Quaker belief called Testimony of simplicity states that a person ought to live her or his life simply. Some tropes about complete exclusion of technology in these groups may not be accurate though. The Amish and other groups do use some modern technology, after assessing its impact on the community.

The 18th-century French Enlightenment philosopher Jean-Jacques Rousseau strongly praised the simple way of life in many of his writings, especially in two books: Discourse on the Arts and Sciences (1750) and Discourse on Inequality (1754).

=== Secular and political ===
Epicureanism, based on the teachings of the Athens-based philosopher Epicurus, flourished from about the fourth century BCE to the third century CE. Epicureanism held that the paradigm of happiness was the untroubled life, which was made possible by carefully considered choices. Epicurus pointed out that troubles entailed by maintaining an extravagant lifestyle tend to outweigh the pleasures of partaking in it. He therefore concluded that what is necessary for happiness, bodily comfort, and life itself should be maintained at minimal cost, while all things beyond what is necessary for these should either be tempered by moderation or completely avoided.

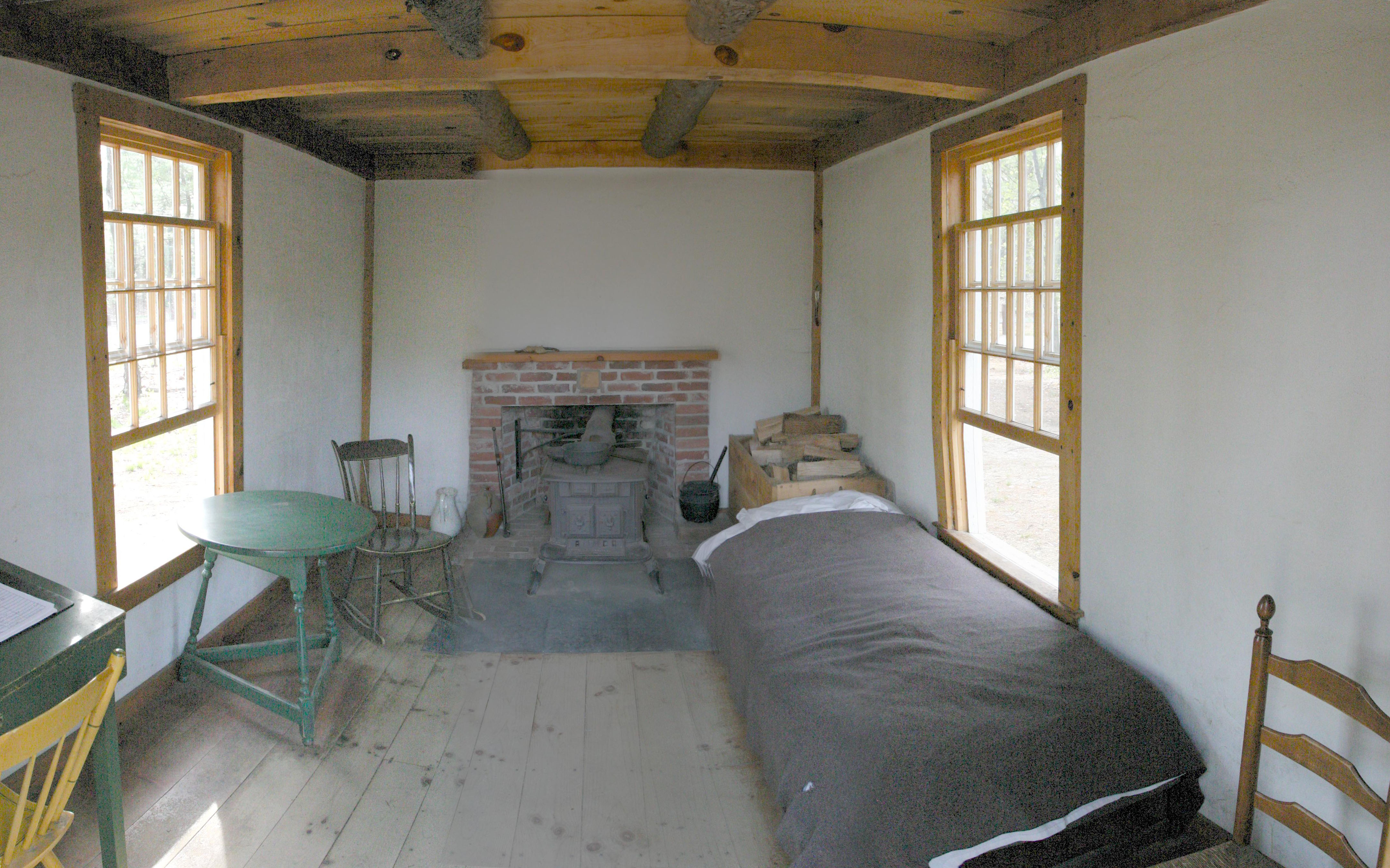
Reconstruction of Henry David Thoreau's cabin on the shores of Walden Pond

Henry David Thoreau, an American naturalist and author, made the classic secular advocacy of a life of simple and sustainable living in his book Walden (1854). Thoreau conducted a two-year experiment living a plain and simple life on the shores of Walden Pond. He concluded: "Our life is frittered away by detail. Simplify, simplify, simplify! I say, let your affairs be as two or three, and not a hundred or a thousand; instead of a million count half a dozen, and keep your accounts on your thumb-nail."

In Victorian Britain, Henry Stephens Salt, an admirer of Thoreau, popularised the idea of "Simplification, the saner method of living". Other British advocates of the simple life included Edward Carpenter, William Morris, and the members of the "Fellowship of the New Life". Carpenter popularised the phrase the "Simple Life" in his essay Simplification of Life in his England's Ideal (1887).

C.R. Ashbee and his followers also practised some of these ideas, thus linking simplicity with the Arts and Crafts movement. British novelist John Cowper Powys advocated the simple life in his 1933 book A Philosophy of Solitude. John Middleton Murry and Max Plowman practised a simple lifestyle at their Adelphi Centre in Essex in the 1930s. Irish poet Patrick Kavanagh championed a "right simplicity" philosophy based on ruralism in some of his work.

George Lorenzo Noyes, a naturalist, mineralogist, development critic, writer, and artist, is known as the Thoreau of Maine. He lived a wilderness lifestyle, advocating through his creative work a simple life and reverence for nature. During the 1920s and 1930s, the Vanderbilt Agrarians of the Southern United States advocated a lifestyle and culture centered upon traditional and sustainable agrarian values as opposed to the progressive urban industrialism which dominated the Western world at that time.

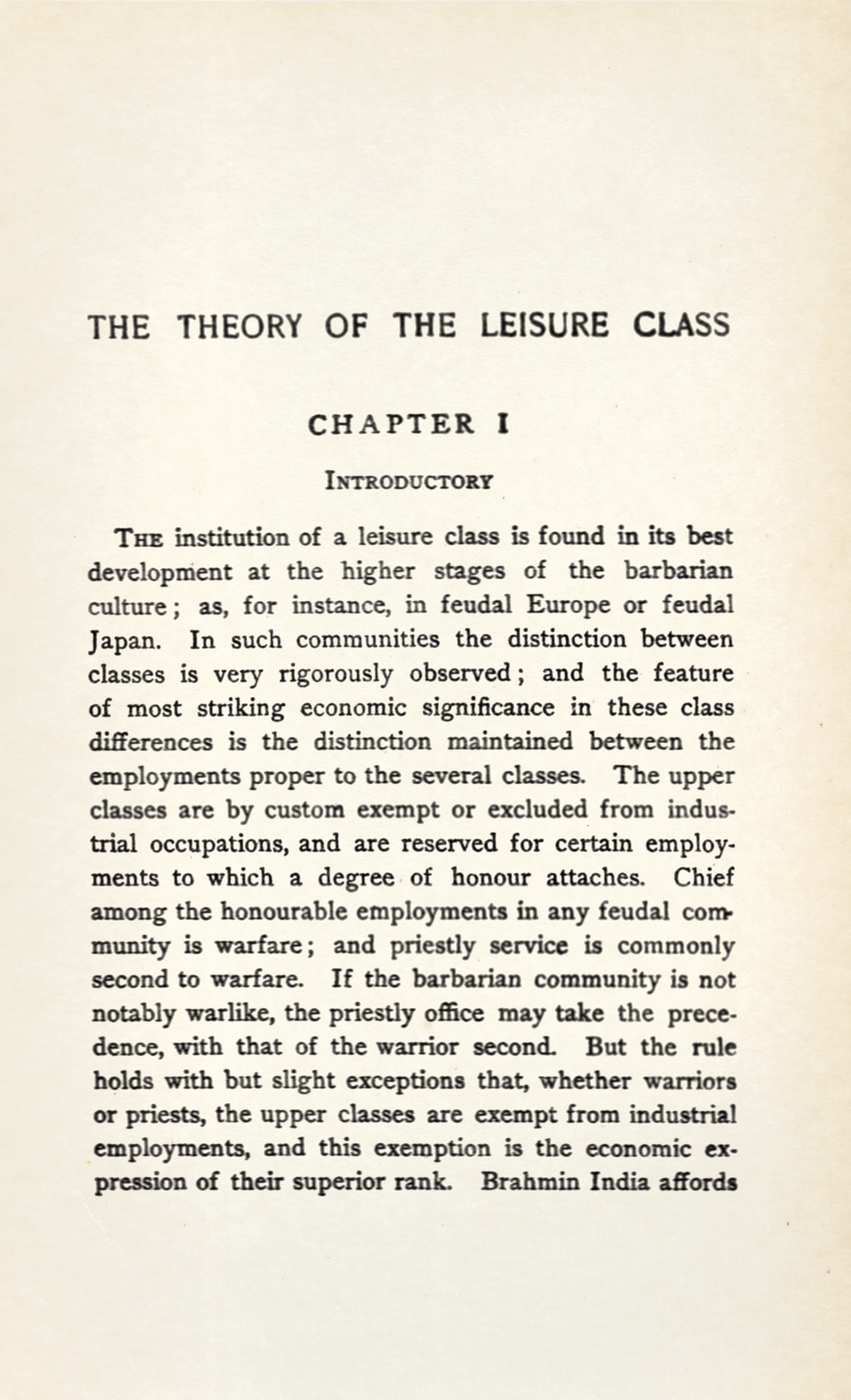
The Theory of the Leisure Class, 1924

The Norwegian-American economist and sociologist Thorstein Veblen warned against the conspicuous consumption of the materialistic society in his The Theory of the Leisure Class (1899); Richard Gregg coined the term "voluntary simplicity" in The Value of Voluntary Simplicity (1936). From the 1920s, a number of modern authors articulated both the theory and practice of living simply, among them Gandhian Richard Gregg, economists Ralph Borsodi and Scott Nearing, anthropologist-poet Gary Snyder, and utopian fiction writer Ernest Callenbach. Economist E. F. Schumacher argued against the notion that "bigger is better" in Small Is Beautiful (1973); and Duane Elgin continued the promotion of the simple life in Voluntary Simplicity (1981).

The Australian academic Ted Trainer practices and writes about simplicity, and established The Simplicity Institute at Pigface Point, some 20 km (12 mi) from the University of New South Wales to which it is attached. A secular set of nine values was developed with the Ethify Yourself project in Austria, having a simplified life style in mind. In the United States voluntary simplicity started to garner more public exposure through a movement in the late 1990s around a popular "simplicity" book, The Simple Living Guide by Janet Luhrs.

== Practices ==
=== Focus on spirituality ===
Certain Christian monasteries and convents, such as the Evangelical-Lutheran Sisters of the Holy Spirit at Alsike Convent, allow Christians to commit a certain period of time (such as the summer period) to living as a hermit in a hermitage. While living as a hermit, individuals reside in desolated cabins that do not contain running water, and focus on prayer (particularly the Divine Office).

Those Christians who desire to live as a hermit, monk or nun may choose to enter the consecrated life (a state of life in the Catholic, Evangelical-Lutheran and Anglican denominations).

=== Reducing consumption, work time, and possessions ===
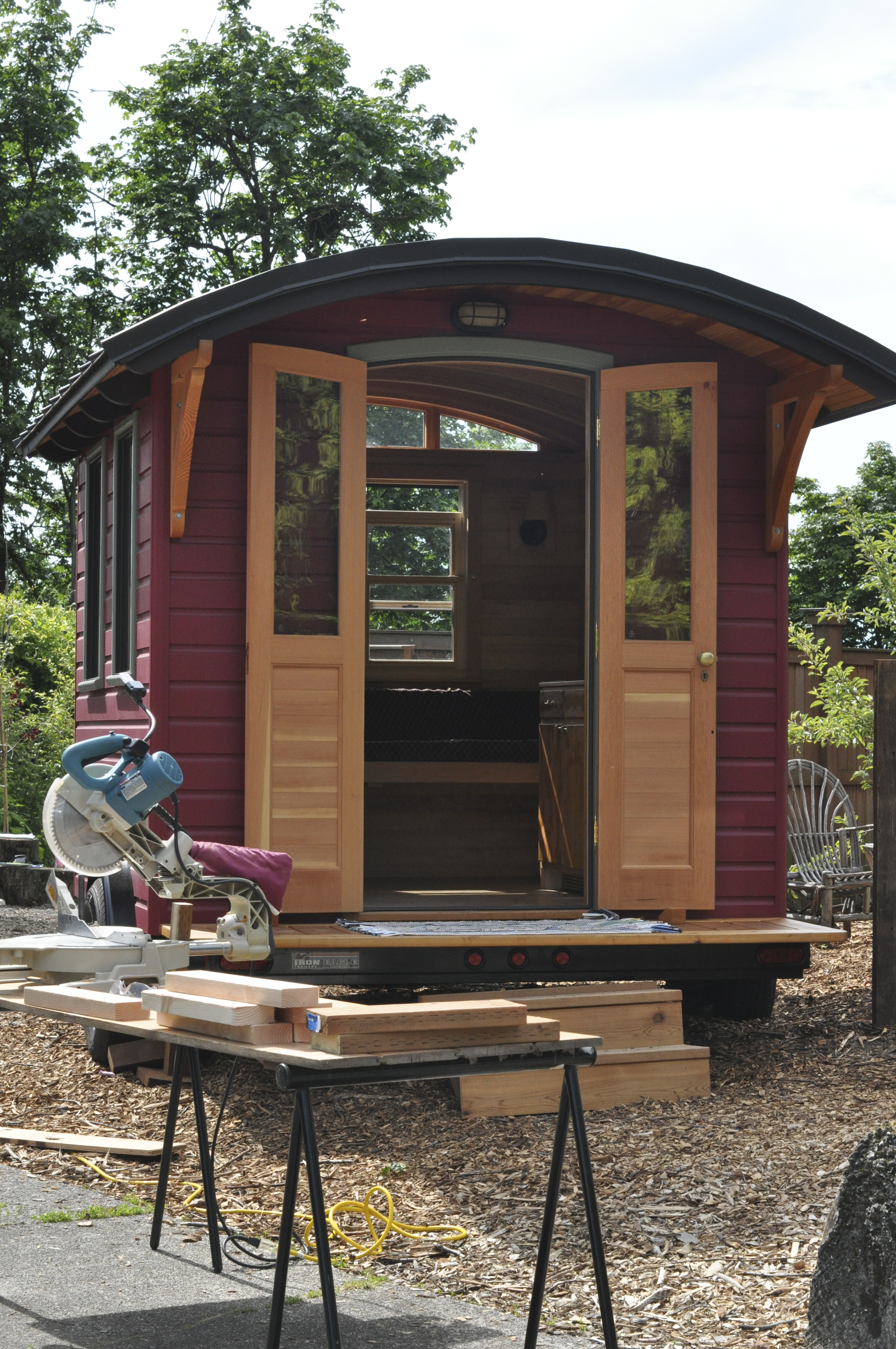
Living simply in a small dwelling

Some people practice simple living by reducing their consumption. Lowering consumption can reduce individual debt, which allows for greater flexibility and simplicity in one's life. If one spends less on goods or services, one can spend less time earning money. The time saved may be used to pursue other interests, to help others through volunteering, or to improve their quality of life, for example, by pursuing creative activities. Developing a detachment from the pursuit of money has led some individuals, such as Suelo and Mark Boyle, to live with no money. People who reduce their expenses can also increase their savings, leading to financial independence and the possibility of early retirement.

The "100 Thing Challenge" is a grassroots movement with the goal of whittling personal possessions down to 100 items as a way of de-cluttering and simplifying life. People in the tiny house movement chose to live in small, mortgage-free, low-impact dwellings, such as log cabins or beach huts.

Joshua Becker suggests that people who desire to simplify their lives begin by simplifying their homes.

=== Increasing self-sufficiency ===
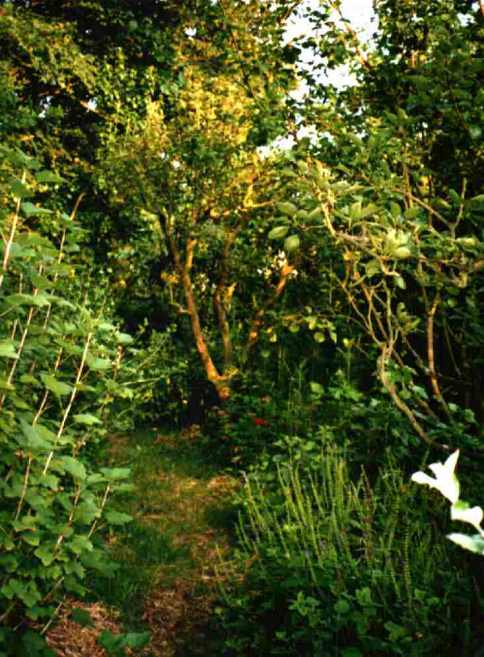
Robert Hart's forest garden in Shropshire, England, UK

Increased self-sufficiency reduces dependency on money and the broader economy. Tom Hodgkinson believes the key to a free and simple life is to stop consuming and start producing. Writer and eco-blogger Jennifer Nini left the city to live off-grid, grow food, and "be a part of the solution; not part of the problem."

Forest gardening, developed by simple living adherent Robert Hart, is a low-maintenance, plant-based food production system based on woodland ecosystems. It incorporates fruit and nut trees, shrubs, herbs, vines, and perennial vegetables. Hart created a model forest garden from a 0.12-acre (490 m^{2}) orchard on his farm at Wenlock Edge in Shropshire.

"Food miles" is a description of the number of miles a given item of food or its ingredients has travelled between the farm and the table. Simple living advocates use this metric to argue for locally grown food, for example in books like The 100-Mile Diet and Barbara Kingsolver's Animal, Vegetable, Miracle: A Year of Food Life. In each of those cases, the authors devoted a year to reducing their carbon footprint by eating locally.

City dwellers can produce home-grown fruit and vegetables in pot gardens or miniature indoor greenhouses. Tomatoes, lettuce, spinach, Swiss chard, peas, strawberries, and several types of herbs can all thrive in pots. Jim Merkel says "A person could sprout seeds. They are tasty, incredibly nutritious, and easy to grow... We grow them in wide-mouthed mason jars with a square of nylon window screen screwed under a metal ring".

=== Reconsidering technology ===
People who practice simple living have diverse views on the role of technology. The American political activist Scott Nearing was skeptical about how humanity would use new technology, citing destructive inventions such as nuclear weapons. Those who eschew modern technology are often referred to as Luddites or neo-Luddites. Although simple living is often a secular pursuit, it may still involve reconsidering appropriate technology as Anabaptist groups such as the Amish or Mennonites have done.

Technology can make a simple lifestyle within mainstream culture easier and more sustainable. The internet can reduce an individual's carbon footprint through remote work and lower paper usage. Some have calculated their energy consumption to show that one can live simply and in a satisfying way by using much less energy than is typically used in Western countries. Technologies they may embrace include computers, photovoltaic systems, wind turbines, and water turbines.

Technological interventions that appear to simplify living may actually induce side effects elsewhere or in the future. Evgeny Morozov warns that tools like the internet can facilitate mass surveillance and political repression. The book Green Illusions identifies how wind and solar energy technologies have hidden side effects and can actually increase energy consumption and entrench environmental harms over time. The authors of the book Techno-Fix criticize technological optimists for overlooking the limitations of technology in solving agricultural problems.

=== Simplifying diet ===
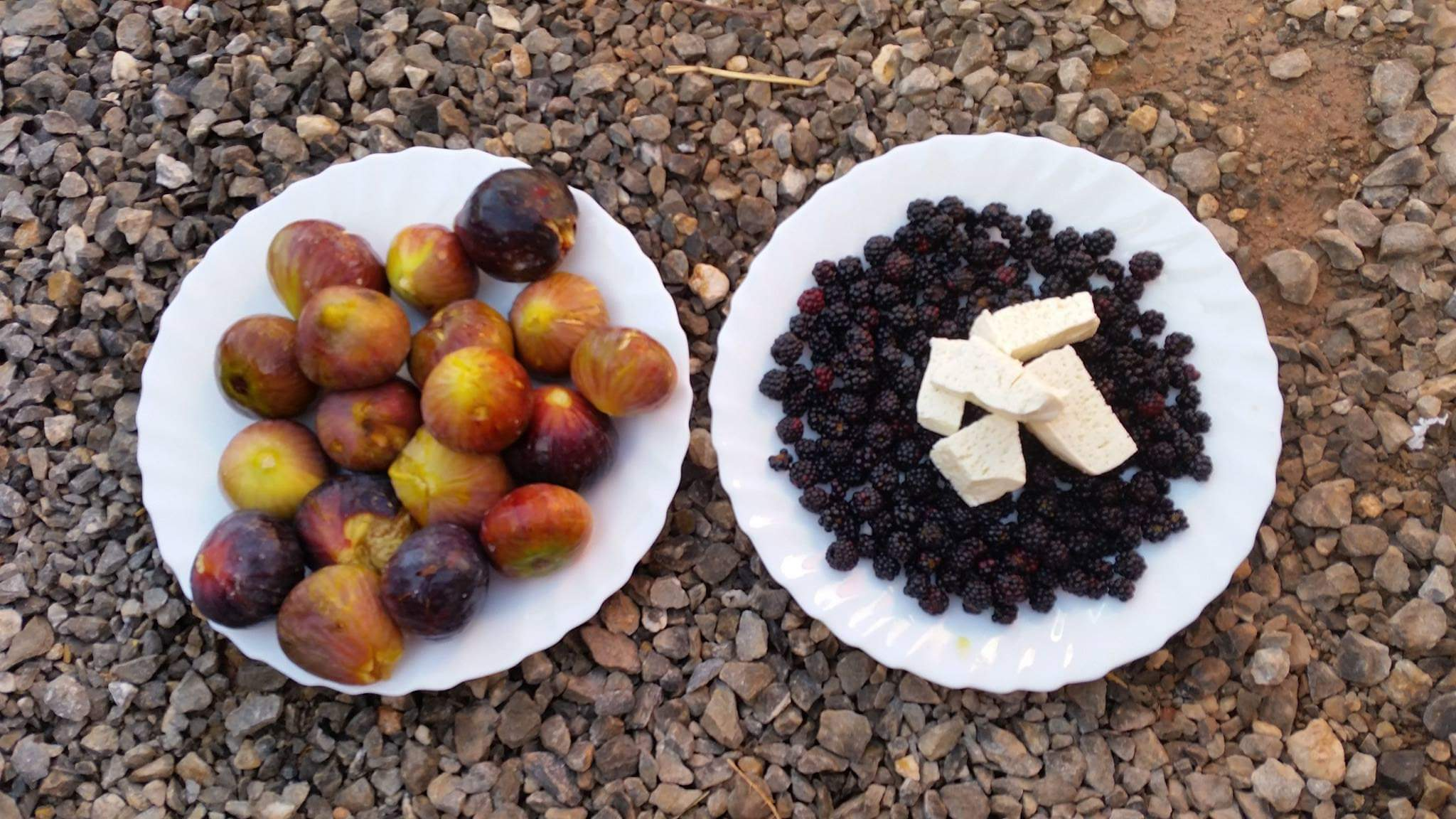
Figs, berries, and cheese

In contrast to diets like vegetarianism, a simplified diet focuses on principles rather than a set of rules. People may use less sophisticated and cheaper ingredients, and eat dishes considered as "comfort food", including home-cooked dishes. Simple diets are usually considered to be "healthy", since they include a significant amount of fruit and vegetables. A simple diet usually avoids highly processed foods and fast-food eating. Simplicity may also entail taking time to be present while eating, such as by following rituals, avoiding multitasking when eating, and putting time aside to consume food mindfully and gratefully, potentially in the company of others. Practicing mindfulness and awareness while eating promotes a deeper sense of connection and responsibility toward understanding food as a meaningful and fulfilling process, rather than merely consuming a product. Moreover, it is common to cook one's own food, by following simple recipes that are not particularly time consuming, in an attempt to reduce the amount of energy necessary for cooking.

A simple diet looks different from person to person and can be adapted to suit individual needs and desires. For instance, in the United Kingdom, the Movement for Compassionate Living was formed by Kathleen and Jack Jannaway in 1984 to spread the message of veganism and promote simple living and self-reliance as a remedy against the exploitation of humans, animals, and the planet.

== Politics and activism ==
=== Environmentalism ===
Environmentalism is inspired by simple living, as harmony with nature is intrinsically dependent on a simple lifestyle. For example, Green parties often advocate simple living as a consequence of their "four pillars" or the "Ten Key Values" of the Green Party of the United States. This includes, in policy terms, their rejection of genetic engineering and nuclear power and other technologies they consider to be hazardous. The Greens' support for simplicity is based on the reduction in natural resource usage and environmental impact. This concept is expressed in Ernest Callenbach's "green triangle" of ecology, frugality, and health.

Some avoid involvement even with green politics as compromising simplicity, however, and instead advocate forms of green anarchism that attempt to implement these principles at a smaller scale, e.g. the ecovillage. Deep ecology, a belief that the world does not exist as a resource to be freely exploited by humans, proposes wilderness preservation, human population control, and simple living.

Minimalist lifestyles may contribute to reduced carbon emissions, although further research is needed to quantify their impact.

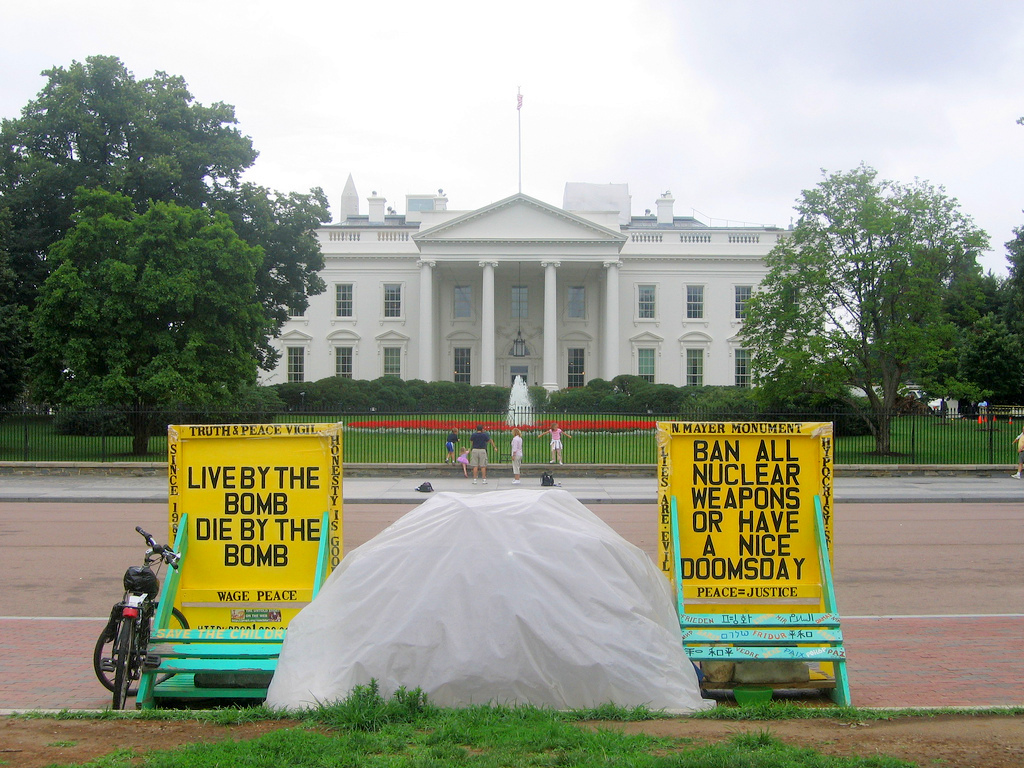
The White House Peace Vigil, started by simple living adherent Ellen Thomas in 1981

=== Arts ===
The term "bohemianism" describes a tradition of both voluntary and involuntary poverty by artists who devote their time to artistic endeavors rather than paid labor. The term was coined by the French bourgeoisie as a way to describe social non-conformists. Bohemians sometimes also expressed their unorthodoxy through simplistic art, for instance in the case of Amedeo Modigliani. Minimalistic art inspired "rebel" artistic movements into the 20th century.

Contemporary art and design have also incorporated sustainability through the creative reuse of materials and efforts to reduce waste. A 2024 study by Zhang and Shen examined how unconventional materials, including discarded human hair and dust, can be transformed into new design objects, demonstrating how artistic practices can reconsider the value of materials that would otherwise be overlooked.

== Economics ==
A new economics movement has been building since the United Nations Conference on the Human Environment in 1972, and the publications that year of Only One Earth, The Limits to Growth, and Blueprint for Survival, followed by Small Is Beautiful: Economics As If People Mattered in 1973.

David Wann introduced the idea of "simple prosperity" as it applies to a sustainable lifestyle. From his point of view, "it is important to ask ourselves three fundamental questions: what is the point of all our commuting and consuming? What is the economy for? And, finally, why do we seem to be unhappier now than when we began our initial pursuit for rich abundance?"

James Robertson's A New Economics of Sustainable Development inspired work of thinkers and activists who participate in his Working for a Sane Alternative network and program. According to Robertson, the shift to sustainability is likely to require a widespread shift of emphasis from raising incomes to reducing costs.

The principles of the new economics, as set out by Robertson, are the following:

- systematic empowerment of people (as opposed to making and keeping them dependent), as the basis for people-centred development
- systematic conservation of resources and the environment, as the basis for environmentally sustainable development
- evolution from a "wealth of nations" model of economic life to a one-world model, and from today's inter-national economy to an ecologically sustainable, decentralising, multi-level one-world economic system
- restoration of political and ethical factors to a central place in economic life and thought
- respect for qualitative values, not just quantitative values

== See also ==
- Affordable housing

== Additional reading ==
- Bender, Sue (1989). Plain and Simple: A Woman's Journey to the Amish. HarperSanFrancisco. ISBN 978-0062500588.
- Berry, Wendell (1990). What Are People For?. North Point Press. ISBN 0865474370.
- Bruno, Dave (2010). The 100 Thing Challenge. HarperCollins. ISBN 978-0061787744.
- Dacyczyn, Amy (1998). The Complete Tightwad Gazette: Promoting Thrift as a Viable Alternative Lifestyle. Random House Publishing. ISBN 0375752250.
- de Graaf, John; Wann, David; Naylor, Thomas (2002). Affluenza: The All-Consuming Epidemic. Berrett-Koehler Publishers. ISBN 1576751996.
- Delany, Paul (1987). The Neo-pagans: Rupert Brooke and the ordeal of youth. Free Press. ISBN 978-0029082805.
- Elgin, Duane (2010) [1981]. Voluntary Simplicity. Harper. ISBN 978-0061779268.
- Eller, Vernard (1973). The Simple Life. W. B. Eerdmans Publishing Company. ISBN 0802815375.
- Fisker, Jacob Lund (2010). Early Retirement Extreme: A philosophical and practical guide to financial independence. CreateSpace Independent Publishing Platform. ISBN 978-1453601211.
- Freed, Dolly (2010) [1978]. Possum Living: How to Live Well Without a Job and with (Almost) No Money. Tin House Books. ISBN 978-0982053935.
- Kondo, Marie (2014). The Life-Changing Magic of Tidying Up. Clarkson Potter/Ten Speed. ISBN 978-1607747307.
- Long, Charles (1996) [1986]. How to Survive Without a Salary: Living the Conserver Lifestyle. Warwick. ISBN 1894622375.
- Luhrs, Janet (1997). The Simple Living Guide: A Sourcebook for Less Stressful, More Joyful Living. Harmony/Rodale. ISBN 0553067966.
- Mills, Stephanie (2002). Epicurean Simplicity. Island Press. ISBN 978-1559636896.
- Nearing, Helen; Nearing, Scott (1970). The Good Life: Helen and Scott Nearing's Sixty Years of Self-Sufficient Living. Schocken.
- Robin, Vicki; Dominguez, Joe (1992). Your Money or Your Life. Viking.
  Robin, Vicki; Tilford, Monique; Zaifman, Mark (2008). Your Money or Your Life: Revised and Updated for the 21st Century. Penguin Books.
- Romney, Edward (2001) [1992]. Living Well on Practically Nothing. Paladin Press. ISBN 1581602820.
- Taylor-Hough, Deborah (2000). A Simple Choice: A practical guide for saving your time, money and sanity. SourceBooks. ISBN 1891400495.
