= Electric Theatre Company =

Electric Theatre Company was a non-profit, regional, Equity theatre company located in Scranton, Pennsylvania. The company was founded in 1992 as The Northeastern Theatre Ensemble by Zeve Ben Dov and played in Scranton for eight years before moving to Keystone College for four years. Artistic leadership was taken up by David Zarko in 2001, and he continued in that position through the company's final season in 2011. The theatre returned to downtown Scranton in 2005 and began the 2008-2009 season under its new name. From 2005 until its demise in 2011, it performed in the old Hotel Jermyn's main ballroom, which was converted into a 99-130 seat, flexible black box theatre. Also within the facility was The Ballroom, a space used for parties, workshops, theatre lab experiments, and classes. ETC closed in June 2011 and was officially disbanded within the following year due to difficulties in maintaining funding levels; although numbers of both donors and audience continued to grow into the final season, dollar amounts fell below a sustainable level.

The Electric Theatre Company offered between five and twelve mainstage productions each year from September through May, including a monodrama series called Acting Alone. Among its mainstage projects were at least one, often several, world premieres each season, including works by Mark Medoff, Ed Simpson, Nancy Hasty, and Mary Ethel Schmidt and devised creations by Zuppa del Giorno. Other highlights include the first professional production outside of New York City of John Cariani's Almost, Maine and a regular series of radio plays under the rubric Lackawanna Rails, directed and edited by Don Wildman.

The production staff was composed of four to six full-time employees, varying numbers of part-time, and a core of volunteers. The artistic company was drawn from a pool of talent from the local region, New York City and Philadelphia, California, and abroad. The theatre was a professional Equity house that operated under a Small Professional Theatre Contract. Electric Theatre Company also ran an extensive Learning program that included The Griffin Conservatory professional level training for the actor (and director) and In Bocca al Lupo, a study abroad in Italy (more below).

ETC's educational programs included:

Griffin Conservatory: professional level training for the actor created by Mary Ethel Schmidt and David Zarko, offered intensives and workshops January through July.
Out on a Limb: the theatre lab of Griffin Conservatory created and run by Mary Ethel Schmidt, a new experiment every third Monday of the month at 7:30 (in The Ballroom)
In Bocca al Lupo: three week program in commedia dell'arte and Italian language and culture in Orvieto and surrounding towns; a collaboration with Lingua Si (Orvieto), Teatro Boni (Acquapendente), with ETC's commedia troupe Zuppa del Giorno, and Italian masters Angelo Crotti and Andrea Brugnera.
This program has continued independently with various partners and in modified formats.
The Portal Projects: a professional/educational collaboration with Marywood University
The Plays the Thing: special matinees, free tickets, and online study guides for middle and high school students
ZipZapZop: a program in Lackawanna's County's ArtsENGAGE! that offered theatre arts training and exploration to high school age students (and just before and just after) combining, when possible, both those from the general population with those determined to be at-risk, created and run by Nancy Hasty and Mary Ethel Schmidt.
