= Jeremiah S. Jeremiah =

American judge

Jeremiah S. Jeremiah, Jr.

Chief Judge of the Rhode Island Family Court
- In office March 1987 – June 30, 2010
- Nominated by: Gov. Edward DiPrete
- Succeeded by: Haiganush R. Bedrosian

Executive Counsel to the Governor
- Nominated by: Gov. Edward DiPrete

Personal details
- Born: 1935 Cranston, Rhode Island, U.S.
- Died: July 19, 2015 (aged 79–80) Warren, Rhode Island, U.S.
- Spouses: Jane Penelope (m. 1955; died 1998) Theresa Candon Jeremiah (m. 2003)
- Children: 3
- Education: Boston University (BA, JD)

Jeremiah S. Jeremiah, Jr. (1935 – July 19, 2015) was an American jurist who served as the Chief Judge of the Rhode Island Family Court from March 1987 until June 2010.

== Early life and career ==
The son of Jeremiah S. Jeremiah and his wife, Lorna, Jeremiah Jr. was of Greek and Canadian descent. A lifelong resident of Cranston, Rhode Island, he had one sister, who also pursued a career in law and became a judge, Constance Messore.

He grew up with future U.S. Senator Jack Reed. Jeremiah attended Boston University, earning a bachelor's degree and then a Juris Doctor degree in 1961. He served in the U.S. Army Reserve from 1957 to 1967, as an artillery officer and battalion adjutant. For his service, he was awarded the Commander's Award for Public Service by the Department of the Army.

In 1963, Jeremiah was appointed as assistant city solicitor for the city of Cranston. In 1978 Jeremiah was promoted to city solicitor, serving in that position until 1984. When Cranston Mayor Edward DiPrete won the gubernatorial election in 1984, Jeremiah was appointed Executive Counsel to the Governor of the State of Rhode Island and served in that capacity from January 1985 until his appointment to the Family Court bench as an associate judge in March 1986.

== Judicial career ==
In March 1987, Governor DiPrete appointed Judge Jeremiah to be the chief judge of the Rhode Island Family Court.

As Chief Judge, Jeremiah oversaw the creation of the Juvenile Drug Court, the Family Treatment Court and the Mental Health Court Clinic. He also served on the board of trustees of the National Council of Juvenile and Family Court Judges and the Rhode Island Governor's Justice Commission.

Judge Jeremiah was named the National Council of Juvenile and Family Court Judges Judge of the Year in 2005. He was also awarded the “Distinguished Service to Literacy Award” by the American Bar Association and the Scripps Howard Foundation.

Jeremiah retired from the bench in June 2010. Associate Family Court Judge Haiganush R. Bedrosian succeeded him as Chief Judge.

== Controversies ==
In April 2012, community activist Anne Grant argued in an op-ed in The Providence Journal against a bill that would have created a special chief judge emeritus license plate for Judge Jeremiah's use. Among other things, Grant argued that Jeremiah's record and that of DiPrete, the Governor who appointed him to the bench and was later imprisoned for corruption, warranted a closer look at Jeremiah's actions as Chief Judge.

== Death ==
Judge Jeremiah died after a long illness on July 19, 2015.
