= Laurel Bestock =

American Egyptologist, archaeologist, and academic

- Citizenship: American
- Occupations: Archaeologist; Egyptologist
- Title: Joukowsky Family Associate Professor of Archaeology and the Ancient World and Egyptology and Assyriology, Brown University

Academic background
- Education: Brown University (B.A.); New York University Institute of Fine Arts (M.A., Ph.D.)
- Thesis: The Development of Royal Funerary Cult at Abydos: Two Funerary Enclosures from the Reign of King Aha

Academic work
- Discipline: Archaeology of Ancient Egypt and the Nile Valley
- Sub-discipline: Kingship, violence, art, monumental architecture, and cultural interactions
- Institutions: Brown University; New York University Institute of Fine Arts

Laurel Bestock is an archaeologist and Egyptologist, whose research focus is on kingship, violence, and art and architecture of ancient Egypt, Sudan, and the region of the Nile Valley. She is the Joukowsky Family Associate Professor of Archaeology and the Ancient World and Egyptology and Assyriology at Brown University, and she is also Executive Director of Excavations at Abydos and Visiting Research Professor at The Institute of Fine Arts, New York University.

== Education ==
Bestock received a Bachelor of Arts (B.A.) degree from Brown University in 1999, with a double concentration in Egyptology and in Old World Art and Archaeology. During her undergraduate studies, she was part of Martha Sharp Joukowsky's excavations at the Great Temple in Petra, Jordan in the summers of 1996-1998.

Bestock earned her Master of Arts (M.A.) and Doctor of Philosophy (Ph.D.) from the Institute of Fine Arts, NYU, in 2004 and 2007, respectively. Her dissertation at the IFA was titled, The Development of Royal Funerary Cult at Abydos: Two New Funerary Enclosures from the Reign of King Aha, which was subsequently published by Harrassowitz Verlag.

== Career and research ==
=== Academic career ===
While completing her doctoral studies, Bestock served for one semester as Adjunct Professor, Egyptian Archaeology at Hunter College, City University of New York. She then became a Research Associate for the Lila Acheson Wallace Egyptian art collection in the Metropolitan Museum of Art for one year.

In July 2008, Bestock returned to her undergraduate alma mater, Brown University, as Assistant Professor of Archaeology and the Ancient World and Egyptology and Ancient Western Asia (later renamed Egyptology and Assyriology) in July 2008. She was appointed to the position of Vartan Gregorian Assistant Professor of Archaeology and the Ancient World & Egyptology and Assyriology in 2013, until she was granted tenure and the title of Associate Professor of Archaeology and the Ancient World & Egyptology and Assyriology in 2016. Brown University's Corporation voted to award her a named chair position at its May 2025 meetings, when her title became Joukowsky Family Associate Professor of Archaeology and the Ancient World and Egyptology and Assyriology.

=== Archaeological research ===
Bestock is the co-director, with Christian Knoblauch (Swansea University), of the Uronarti Regional Archaeology Project (URAP), an excavation at Uronarti, Sudan. Beginning in 2012, the project is excavating and anyalyzing a 12th Dynasty fortress and surrounding buildings on the island of Uronarti, in Lower Nubia—updating and expanding on archaeological research undertaken in the 1920s and 1930s.

She is also co-director of Kiosk Archaeological Recording Platform, a system of recording archaeological data that was developed at Brown University and has been used by multiple Brown and non-Brown field projects, including sites in Italy, Peru, Egypt, Cyprus, and Providence, RI, and Wellesely, MA, in the United States.

In 2025, New York University's Institute of Fine Arts appointed Bestock the Executive Director of the University's Excavations at Abydos, in Egypt.

=== Media appearances ===
Bestock has made multiple appearances in high-profile media outlets, most notably on Episode 8 ("Egypt's Lost Wonders") of National Geographic TV's Drain the Oceans series and as a featured guest in Daily Motion's Wired video series, in which experts answer common questions about their field of research.

== Selected publications ==
- Bestock, Laurel. (2017). Violence and Power in Ancient Egypt: Images and Ideology before the New Kingdom (Abingdon and New York: Routledge). ISBN 978-1138685055
- Bestock, Laurel. (2009). The Development of Royal Funerary Cult at Abydos: Two New Funerary Enclosures from the Reign of King Aha. ISBN 978-3447058384.
