= List of honorary fellows of Clare College, Cambridge =

This is a list of Honorary Fellows of Clare College, Cambridge. See also Category:Alumni of Clare College, Cambridge.

- Desmond Ackner, Baron Ackner
- Peter Ackroyd
- Susan Alcock
- Sir Alex Allan
- Anthony Appiah
- Sir David Attenborough
- Sir Walter Bodmer
- Sir David Cannadine
- Fernando Henrique Cardoso
- Vivienne Faull
- Sir Roger Norrington
