= Andrew Scherer =

American anthropologist and archaeologist

Andrew K. Scherer
- Title: Director of the Joukowsky Institute for Archaeology and the Ancient World, Professor of Anthropology, and Professor of Archaeology and the Ancient World

Academic background
- Education: Texas A&M University
- Thesis: Dental Analysis of Classic Period Population Variability in the Maya Area (2004)

Academic work
- Discipline: Archaeology and anthropology
- Sub-discipline: mortuary archaeology, bioarchaeology, landscape archaeology, warfare and violence
- Institutions: Wagner College, Baylor University, and Brown University

Andrew K. Scherer is an anthropological archaeologist and biological anthropologist with a geographic focus in Mesoamerica (Maya). Scherer's research interests include mortuary archaeology, bioarchaeology, landscape archaeology, ritual practice, warfare and violence, political practice, and diet and subsistence. He has been Director of the Joukowsky Institute for Archaeology and the Ancient World at Brown University since July 2023.

== Early life and education ==
Among Scherer's earliest experiences with archaeology was his position as first Team Member (from July 2002 through March 2003) then Team Leader (January 2005) with Kenyon International Emergency Services, where he assisted with the processing of human remains from the World Trade Center disaster and American Airlines Flight 587, and repatriation of human remains from the December 26, 2004 Tsunami Disaster, Phukut and Krabi, Thailand.

Scherer studied anthropology at Texas A&M University. He completed a Doctor of Philosophy (PhD) degree in 2004. His doctoral dissertation was titled "Dental Analysis of Classic Period Population Variability in the Maya Area".

== Academic career ==
Scherer's first academic appointment was as Assistant Professor of Anthropology in the Department of Sociology and Anthropology at Wagner College, starting in August 2004. In 2007, he left Wagner to become Assistant Professor of Anthropology in Baylor University's Department of Anthropology, Forensic Science, and Archaeology.

In 2010, Scherer moved to Brown University where he was appointed Assistant Professor of Anthropology and Archaeology in the Department of Anthropology and in the Joukowsky Institute for Archaeology and the Ancient World. He became Associate Professor in July 2016, and Professor of Anthropology and Archaeology in July 2024. In July 2023, he was appointed Director of the Joukowsky Institute for Archaeology and the Ancient World at Brown.

Scherer is the Joukowsky Institute Representative to the Archaeological Centers Coalition, and serves on the Editorial Committee of Anales de Antropología, the Comité de Arqueología of Guatemala's Fundaciόn Defensores de la Naturaleza, and the Advisory Board of Friends of the Fundaciόn Defensores de la Naturaleza.

== Research ==
Scherer has conducted bioarchaeological research at Maya sites throughout Mexico and Guatemala, including Lacanja Tzeltal (Sak tzʼi'), Piedras Negras, Yaxha, and El Zotz.

Scherer co-directs an interdisciplinary archaeological research project that is exploring Classic Maya polities along the Usumacinta River in Mexico. In 2022, The New York Times reported that a team led by Scherer and the project's co-director, Dr. Charles Golden, working at a site later named Lacanjá Tzeltal, discovered artifacts and human remains that, based on later radiocarbon dating, established that the site had been "a — if not the — capital of the Sak Tz’i' dynasty." The project had previously been profiled by Archaeology Magazine, which focused on Scherer and Golden's discovery of the first known case of Maya kingdoms using walls to defend a border.

In a study released in April 2025 in Antiquity, Scherer, along with co-authors from the United States and Guatemala, posited that a painted altar outside the Maya city of Tikal, in Guatemala, found in the course of archaeological fieldwork, was created by an artisan trained at Teotihuacan. The discovery is significant not only because the altar is unique in its display of Teotihuacan architectural and artistic forms, but its inscriptions and artistic style are evidence of an active Teotihuacan presence at Tikal. Scherer was interviewed by National Public Radio about this discovery, and the news was also featured in the Associated Press, CNN, Washington Post, CBS News, Smithsonian Magazine, and other media outlets around the world.

Scherer is frequently cited in academic works and consulted by scientific news sources on topics relevant to Maya civilization, particularly the use of lidar in archaeology of Mesoamerica and mortuary archaeology.

== Selected works ==
- Román Ramírez, Edwin; Paiz Aragón, Lorena; Bass, Angelyn; Garrison, Thomas G.; Houston, Stephen; Hurst, Heather; Stuart, David; Corado Ochoa, Alejandrina; García Leal, Cristina; Scherer, Andrew; Piedrasanta Castellanos, Rony E. (2025). "A Teotihuacan altar at Tikal, Guatemala: central Mexican ritual and elite interaction in the Maya Lowlands". Antiquity. 99 (404): 462–480. doi:10.15184/aqy.2025.3.
- Scherer, Andrew; Garrison, Thomas (2024). Substance of the Ancient Maya: Kingdoms and Communities, Objects and Beings. University of New Mexico Press. ISBN 9780826366566.
- Scherer, Andrew; Tiesler, Vera (2018). Smoke, Flames, and the Human Body in Mesoamerican Ritual Practice. Washington, DC: Dumbarton Oaks, Harvard University Press. ISBN 9780884024262.
- Scherer, Andrew (2015). Mortuary Landscapes of the Classic Maya: Rituals of Body and Soul. Austin: University of Texas Press. ISBN 9781477300510.
- Scherer, Andrew; Verano, John (2014). Embattled Bodies, Embattled Places: War in Pre-Columbian Mesoamerica and the Andes. Washington, DC: Dumbarton Oaks, Harvard University Press. ISBN 9780884023951.
