= Martha Sharp Joukowsky =

American archaeologist (1936–2022)

- Born: Martha Content Sharp; September 2, 1936; Montague, Massachusetts, U.S.
- Died: January 7, 2022 (aged 85)
- Children: Artemis Joukowsky III (son)

Academic background
- Education: Pembroke College, Brown University; Pantheon-Sorbonne University; American University of Beirut

Academic work
- Discipline: Archaeology
- Sub-discipline: Near Eastern archaeology
- Institutions: Brown University; Archaeological Institute of America
- Main interests: Excavations at Petra in Jordan

Martha Sharp Joukowsky (September 2, 1936 – January 7, 2022) was an American archaeologist and a member of the faculty of Brown University known for her fieldwork at the ancient site of Petra in Jordan.

== Early life and education ==
Martha Sharp Joukowsky was the daughter of Waitstill Hastings Sharp and Martha Ingham Dickie, noted for aiding refugees, including Jews, escaping Nazi persecution in Czechoslovakia and France before and during World War II. Joukowsky was educated at Pembroke College (B.A. 1958), American University of Beirut (MA 1972), and Paris I-Sorbonne (Ph.D. 1982).

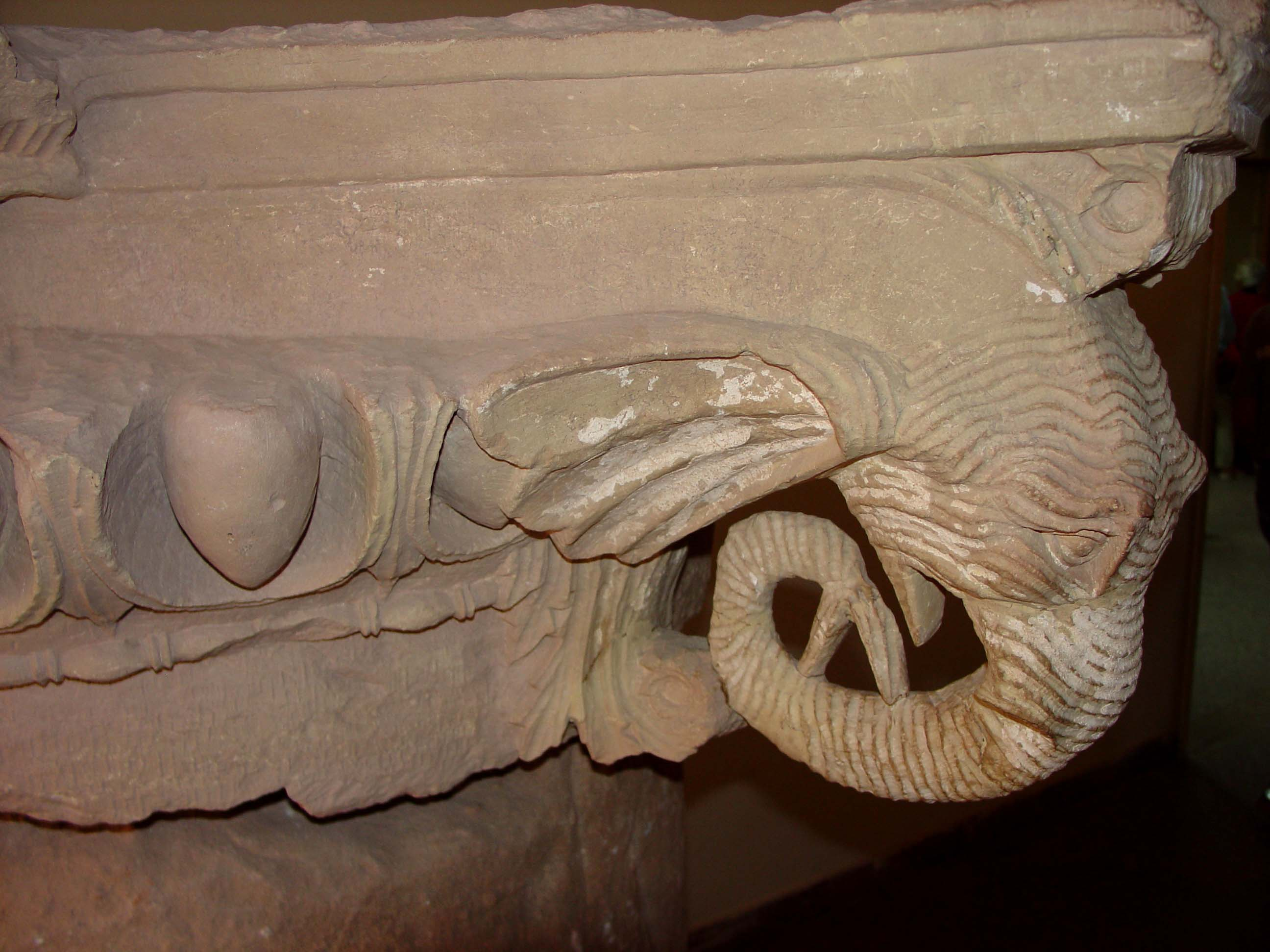
Elephant head capital from the Great Temple, Petra

== Academic career ==
From 1982 to 2002, Joukowsky was Professor in the Center for Old World Archaeology and Art and the Department of Anthropology at Brown University. Her archaeological fieldwork has included work in Lebanon (1967-1972), Hong Kong (1972-1973), Turkey (1975-1986), Italy (1982-1985), and Greece (1987-1990). Joukowsky conducted archaeological fieldwork at Petra for more than ten years, beginning in 1992. Her work, and that of Brown University, focused on Petra's so-called "Great Temple" during that time.

Martha Sharp Joukowsky was also elected as President (1989-1993) of the Archaeological Institute of America and was Trustee for the American University of Beirut, Lebanon. She also served as Trustee Emerita of Brown University.

== Personal life ==
Artemis A. W. Joukowsky, her husband, was chancellor of Brown University (1997–98) and together they created the Artemis A.W. and Martha Sharp Joukowsky Institute for Archaeology and the Ancient World at Brown University in 2004; the institute was first directed by Susan Alcock, who was succeeded in the post by Peter van Dommelen.

Joukowsky died on January 7, 2022, at the age of 85.

== Honours ==
In 1993, Joukowsky endowed an annual lecture series in her own name for the Archaeological Institute of America.

She accepted the Yad Vashem award on behalf of her parents in 2006.

== Selected publications ==
- Joukowsky, Martha Sharp (1980). A Complete Manual of Field Archaeology: Tools and Techniques of Field Work for Archaeologists. Prentice-Hall. ISBN 978-0131621640.
- Joukowsky, Martha Sharp (1988). The young archaeologist in the oldest port city in the world. Dar El-Machreq. ASIN B002SESBC0.
- Joukowsky, Martha Sharp (1996). Early Turkey: An Introduction to the Archaeology of Anatolia from Prehistory Through the Lydian Period. Kendall/Hunt Publishing Company. ISBN 9780787221416.
- Joukowsky, Martha Sharp (1996). Prehistoric Aphrodisias: an account of the excavations and artifact studies. Brown University/Universite Catholique de Louvain. ASIN B00JJ5G83U.
- Joukowsky, Martha Sharp (1998). Petra Great Temple, Volume I: Brown University excavations, 1993-1997. Brown University Petra Exploration Fund. ISBN 9780966802405.
- Cohen, Getzel M.; Joukowsky, Martha Sharp, eds. (2004). Breaking ground: pioneering women archaeologists. ISBN 978-0472031740.
- Joukowsky, Martha Sharp (2007). Petra Great Temple, Volume II: Archaeological Contexts of the Remains and Excavations. Brown University Petra Exploration Fund. ISBN 9780979744808.
