= Graduate Group in the Art and Archaeology of the Mediterranean World =

Interdisciplinary academic program

Coordinates: 39.9492°N 75.191143°W

The Graduate Group in the Art and Archaeology of the Mediterranean World (AAMW) is an interdisciplinary program for research and teaching of archaeology, particularly archaeology and art of the ancient Mediterranean (Greece and Rome), Egypt, Anatolia, and the Near East, based in the Penn Museum of the University of Pennsylvania.

== History ==
Doctoral work in Mediterranean and Near Eastern Archaeology has been a feature of the University of Pennsylvania since 1898, largely in response to the excavations undertaken by the Penn Museum. Nearly 200 dissertations in Old World Archaeology and Art have been produced at Penn in the course of the last century.

The eminent archaeologist Rodney Young, the director of the Penn Museum's excavations at Gordion that uncovered the royal tomb of King Midas, strengthened the graduate program during the 1960s and 1970s.

== Core faculty ==
The current Chair of the Program is Thomas F. Tartaron. Other notable faculty include Philip P. Betancourt, Lothar Haselberger, Holly Pittman, and C. Brian Rose.

== Current fieldwork ==
- "Mediterranean and Near Eastern Fieldwork at Penn". School of Arts and Sciences, University of Pennsylvania. Archived from the original on February 22, 2011.
- "Halil Rud Archaeological Project". School of Arts and Sciences, University of Pennsylvania. Archived from the original on February 22, 2011.
- "Mediterranean and Near Eastern Fieldwork at Penn". School of Arts and Sciences, University of Pennsylvania. Archived from the original on February 22, 2011.
- "Mediterranean and Near Eastern Fieldwork at Penn". School of Arts and Sciences, University of Pennsylvania. Archived from the original on February 22, 2011.
- "Mediterranean and Near Eastern Fieldwork at Penn". School of Arts and Sciences, University of Pennsylvania. Archived from the original on February 22, 2011.
- "Mediterranean and Near Eastern Fieldwork at Penn". School of Arts and Sciences, University of Pennsylvania. Archived from the original on February 22, 2011.
- "Mediterranean and Near Eastern Fieldwork at Penn". School of Arts and Sciences, University of Pennsylvania. Archived from the original on February 22, 2011.
- "Mediterranean and Near Eastern Fieldwork at Penn". School of Arts and Sciences, University of Pennsylvania. Archived from the original on February 22, 2011.

== Notable alumni ==
The AAMW program and its predecessors have graduated a number of prominent archaeologists, including:

- George Bass (PhD., 1964), professor emeritus at Texas A&M University and an early practitioner of underwater archaeology
- Crawford "Greenie" Greenewalt Jr. (PhD., 1966), past director of the excavations at Sardis and professor at the University of California, Berkeley
- Philip Betancourt (PhD., 1970), Director of the Institute for Aegean Prehistory and professor at Temple University
- G. Kenneth Sams (PhD., 1971), past director of the Gordion excavations and professor at the University of North Carolina at Chapel Hill
- Jeremy Rutter (PhD., 1974), ceramics specialist and professor at Dartmouth College
- Zahi Hawass (PhD., 1987), former Minister of Antiquities of Egypt
- Jodi Magness (PhD., 1989), co-director of the excavations in the late Roman fort at Yotvata, Israel and professor at the University of North Carolina at Chapel Hill

== See also ==
- Outline of archaeology
- University of Pennsylvania Museum of Archaeology and Anthropology
- Vrokastro
- Joukowsky Institute for Archaeology and the Ancient World
