= Brian Rose =

Brian or Bryan Rose may refer to:

- Brian Rose (cricketer) (born 1950), English former cricketer
- Brian Rose (baseball) (born 1976), American former baseball player
- Brian Rose (podcaster) (born 1971), American-born podcaster based in London
- Brian Rose (racing driver) (born 1979), American former stock car racing driver
- Brian Rose (boxer) (born 1985), British boxer
- C. Brian Rose, American archaeologist
- Bryan Rose (born 1943), New Zealand former long-distance runner
