= Crawford Hallock Greenewalt Jr. =

Classical archaeologist

- Born: June 3, 1937; Wilmington, Delaware, U.S.
- Died: May 4, 2012 (aged 74); Hockessin, Delaware, U.S.
- Education: Harvard University (BA); University of Pennsylvania (PhD)
- Known for: Archaeology at Sardis
- Scientific career
- Fields: Classical archaeology
- Workplaces: University of California, Berkeley
- Thesis: Lydian Pottery of the Sixth-century B.C.: The Lydion and Marbled Ware (1966)

Crawford Hallock Greenewalt Jr. (June 3, 1937 – May 4, 2012) was an American classical archaeologist at the University of California, Berkeley who made contributions to the study of Lydia through his excavations at Sardis.

== Biography ==
Greenewalt was the son of Crawford Hallock Greenewalt, a chemical engineer and later president of DuPont, and Margaretta L. Greenewalt. He had one brother, David Greenewalt, and one sister, Nancy G. Frederick. He attended the Tower Hill School, received a B.A. from Harvard University in 1959, and a Ph.D. in Classical Archaeology from the University of Pennsylvania in 1966. Greenwalt died of a brain tumor in 2012.

== Archaeology ==
Greenewalt first showed in interest in archaeology at age eight. While an undergraduate at Harvard, Greenewalt worked at the Sardis excavation, where he became known for his ability to crawl through the narrow tunnels constructed by earlier tomb robbers. After graduating in 1959, Greenewalt joined the Sardis excavation as a staff photographer. Greenewalt's Ph.D. thesis was on the Lydian pottery, like those recovered at the Sardis excavation. Greenewalt worked on the Sardis excavation every summer from 1959 to 2011. In 1976 he was made the field director of the excavation, a position he held until 2007 when he turned it over to Nicholas Cahill.

== Awards and honors ==
Greenewalt was a member of the American Philosophical Society, and an honorary member the German Archaeological Institute and Austrian Archaeological Institute. In 1993 he was awarded the Henry Allen Moe Prize in Humanities by the American Philosophical Society for his paper "When a Mighty Empire Was Destroyed" and for his work on reconstructing the history of Lydia. In 2012 he was awarded Archaeological Institute of America's Bandelier Award for Public Service to Archaeology for his work at Sardis.

The research library of archaeology at Ege University, İzmir, to which Greenewalt had left his private library, was named "Greenewalt Library" in 2015.

== Bibliography ==
- Fox, Margalit (May 20, 2012), "Crawford Greenewalt Jr., Who Shed Light on an Ancient City, Dies at 74", The New York Times, New York City, p. A22, archived from the original on June 12, 2022
- Maclay, Kathleen (April 26, 2012), "Crawford Greenewalt receives prestigious award for work at site of ancient city of Sardis", UC Berkeley News Center, University of California, Berkeley, archived from the original on May 31, 2012
- Maclay, Kathleen (May 10, 2012), "Noted classical archaeologist Crawford Greenwalt dies", UC Berkeley News Center, University of California, Berkeley, archived from the original on May 22, 2012
- "GREENEWALT, Crawford Hallock", San Francisco Chronicle, San Francisco, California: Hearst Corporation, p. Z99, May 19, 2012
- "Lydian Pottery of the Sixth-century B.C.: The Lydion and Marbled Ware", ScholarlyCommons: Repository, University of Pennsylvania, archived from the original on March 4, 2016
