= Beit al-Tutunji =

Early nineteenth-century historic house in Mosul, Iraq

Coordinates: 36°20′29.76″N 43°7′50.88″E

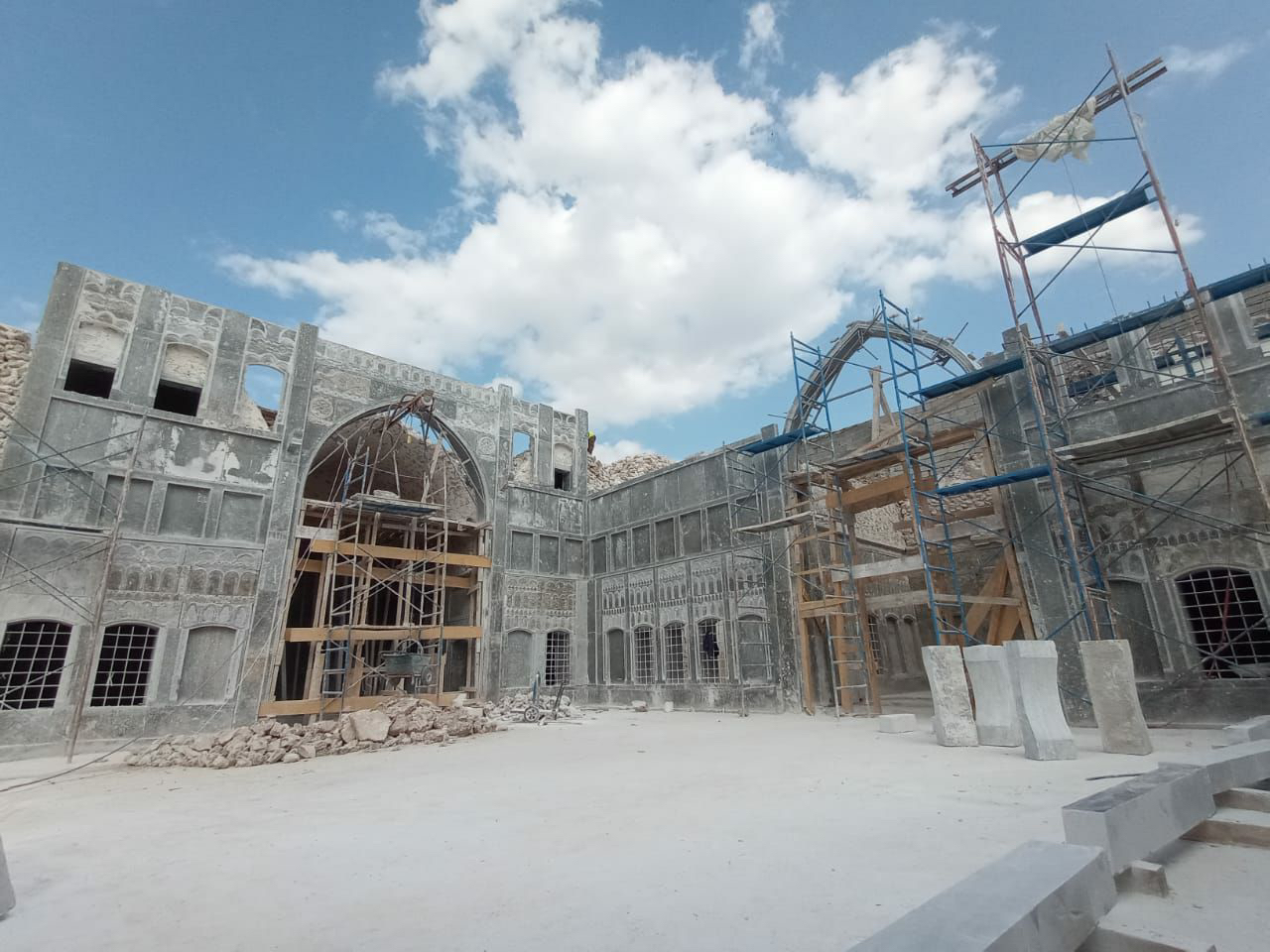
Beit al-Tutunji courtyard, Mosul, Iraq, during conservation and repair in 2021

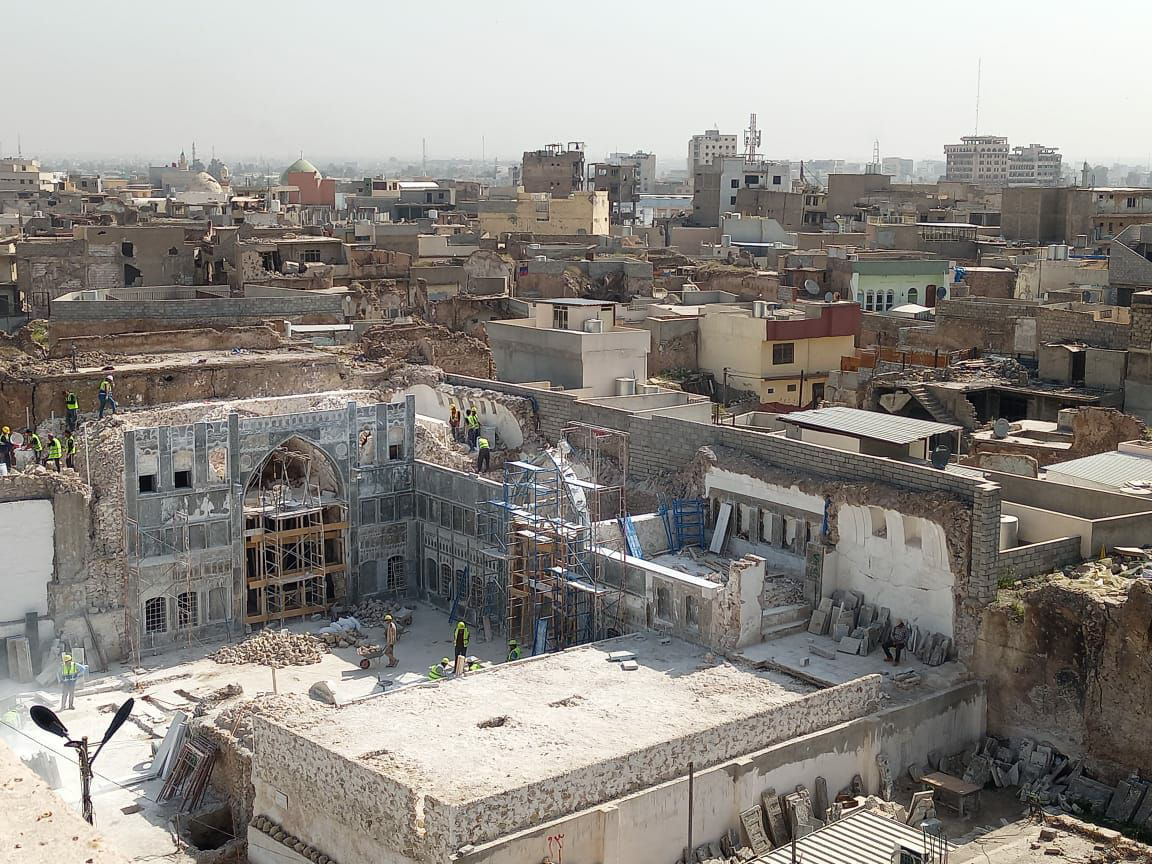
Beit al-Tutunji viewed from above with Mosul skyline

Beit al-Tutunji is an early nineteenth-century historic house in Mosul, Iraq that represents an example of Ottoman vernacular architecture. The house features a large courtyard and exterior walls decorated with inscribed bas-reliefs of local marble. During the occupation of Mosul by the Islamic State of Iraq and the Levant (ISIL) from 2014 to 2017, ISIL used the house as an artillery encampment. In 2017, U.S.-led international forces known as the Combined Joint Task Force (CJTF) launched airstrikes in an attempt to liberate the city from ISIL control, and destroyed the house in the process. Following the Iraqi government’s reoccupation of Mosul in 2017, restorations began on Beit al-Tutunji, with the goal of turning it into a municipal museum and cultural center. In 2024, the Nineveh Governorate reopened the Tutunji house to the public.

== Early history of the house and architecture ==
Construction of Beit al-Tutunji occurred in the early nineteenth century, likely between 1808 and 1817. Materials of construction included limestone, marble, granite, brick, and wood. The original occupant was the Ottoman governor of Mosul, who had mercantile connections. The family had the name “Tutunji”, which is why the house became known as Beit al-Tutunji, which means “house of the tobacco merchant” in Arabic. Its construction consists of stone rubble set in lime, with carved marble and plaster decorations. Exterior wall decorations contain inscriptions from the Koran, painted in blue on white background, and Arabic poetry and Arabesque motifs incised into local Mosul marble.

Beit al-Tutunji confirms the pattern of what Ahmad Abdul-Wahid Thanoon has described as the "traditional house architecture" of Old City Mosul. It contained certain basic components including a large central courtyard, an Iwan with a pointed arch, chambers (with windows opening to the central courtyard, not to the exterior) arranged in wings of the house, a basement, corridors, and hallways. It also contained a kitchen, food storage area, grain storage area (called al-ashkhim), stairs leading to the rooftop, and a well for water. Decorative elements, including those made from Mosul marble as arches, pillars, and door frames, were on the interior, while the exterior of the building is plain. The design of the basement and hallways kept the building cool in hot summers. The rooftop functioned as a space for sleeping in hot summers. The wood used for doorways would have originally been from the trees of the pomegranate or mulberry. The courtyard, according to Thanoon, was the "lung of the house" where most activities occurred. The focus of life in the courtyard (along with the fact that doors and windows of rooms opened into the courtyard) maintained the family's privacy.

In 1981, ownership of the house passed to the Iraqi State Board of Antiquities and Heritage (SBAH). By the early twenty-first century, Beit al-Tutunji had fallen into disrepair. The SBAH was restoring the building in 2014, with the goal of making it into a cultural center, when ISIL fighters arrived in 2014 and seized the premises.

== Destruction under ISIL ==
During their three-year occupation in Mosul beginning in 2014, ISIL used the Tutunji house as an explosive factory and a military encampment because it provided its forces with an effective location from which to project shells across the Tigris River into east Mosul. At the same time, ISIL targeted for destruction many historic sites, including places of worship, shrines, and cemeteries associated with both Muslim (Sunni and Shi'a) and minority communities, with the latter including various Christians and Yezidis. Some scholars have described the efforts of ISIL as an acts of "cultural genocide" of the city's "architectural heritage", while others have noted the lasting trauma that the destruction has had on a Mosul-centered collective identity.

At the end of the occupation in 2017, the CJTF targeted the Tutunji house with airstrikes, damaging much of it in the process. In this sense, reasons for the destruction of Beit al-Tutunji differ from those of many other architecturally and historically significant buildings that experienced damage in Mosul. ISIL did not destroy the house, and did not have ideological reasons for doing so, in contrast to most significant structures ruined during their tenure.

== Reconstruction ==
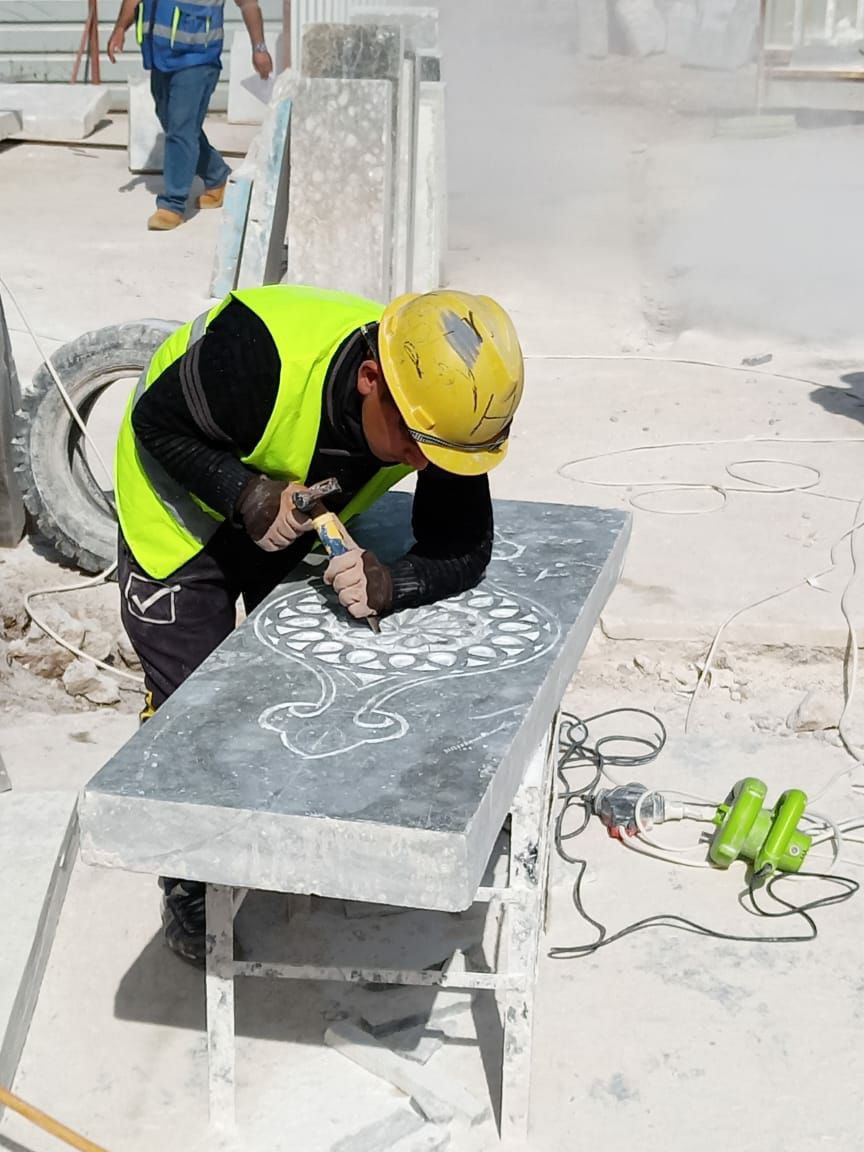
Beit al-Tutunji and the revived art of carving Mosul marble, 2021

Although the State Board of Antiquities and Heritage had nearly succeeded in restoring the house when ISIL occupied it in 2014, the al-Tutunji house was almost entirely in rubble when the conflict ended in 2016. Soon after, scholars at the University of Pennsylvania ("Penn"), led by Michael D. Danti and Richard L. Zettler, established the Iraq Heriage Stabilization Program (IHSP) to restore the Tutunji house in collaboration with scholars at the University of Mosul.

The Tutunji house became just one among many sites in Mosul and its environs that became focal points for conservation efforts, some of them in projects led by UNESCO, and others funded by donors from particular countries, such as Saudi Arabia and the United Arab Emirates, with a prime example being the historic Al-Nuri Mosque. Among sites selected for extensive conservation, Beit al-Tutunji stands out for being an example of secular, not religious, architecture.

Penn’s IHSP received funding for conservation work of Beit al-Tutunji from several major sources, including the U.S. State Department, the Swiss foundation known as the International Alliance for the Protection of Heritage in Conflict Areas (ALIPH), and the Gerda Henkel Foundation. The IHSP has used these funds to support restoration of the Tutunji house and other sites in Iraq, including Taq-i Kisra (also known as the Arch of Ctesiphon), which claims the largest single-span vault of unreinforced bricks in the world; and Mashki Gate in Nineveh (which ISIL bulldozed in 2016). Although the COVID-19 pandemic slowed the progress of restoration, IHSP had restored about 60% of the Tutunji house by October 2021.

In April 2020 in Abu Dhabi, the Aliph Foundation launched an additional emergency relief fund of $1 million (Dh3.6m). The goal of this funding was to support conservation projects including restoration of Beit al-Tutunji amid the COVID-19 pandemic.

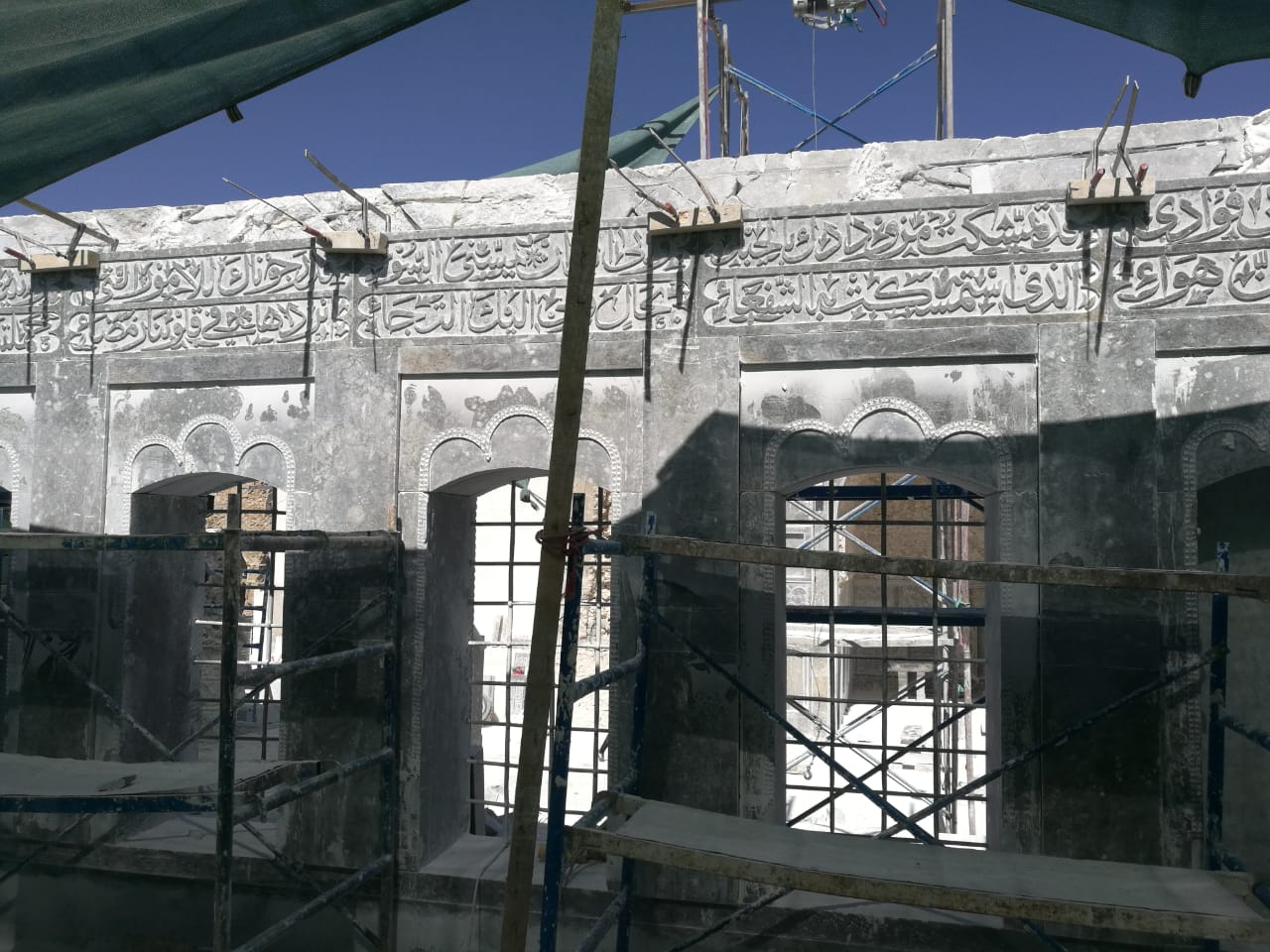
Arabic inscription in marble on the Tutunji House showing the Hamziyya of al-Busiri in praise of the Prophet Muhammad, Mosul, Iraq

Following mine clearance in the area by the Iraqi Army, reconstruction and conservation efforts began in 2020. Additionally, in order to preserve the craft of Mosul stone carving, the project created a workshop on site to train local community members in this skill, and preserve the unique cultural art of the house by creating marble bas-reliefs inscribed with Arabesque designs and Arabic calligraphy.

An inscription runs around the hall of the west wing of the house quoting hemistichs from the Hamziyya, a poem that praises the prophet Muhammad, composed by the Sufi poet Imam Muhammad al-Busuri (d. 1294). The lines translate to read, "I ask for your protection. My heart which has sinned is like air; I hold on to the rope of your love like one smitten; God will keep me from harm when I take refuge in you; We resort to you in the most scorching of matters."
