= Holly Pittman =

Art historian and archaeologist

Academic work
- Discipline: Art History
- Institutions: University of Pennsylvania

Holly Pittman is a Near Eastern art historian and archaeologist, and an expert in Near Eastern glyptic art. She is the Bok Family Professor in the Humanities and a Professor in the History of Art Department of the University of Pennsylvania and serves as a curator in the Near East Section of the University of Pennsylvania Museum of Archaeology and Anthropology. Before joining the University of Pennsylvania, she was a curator of Ancient Near Eastern Art at the Metropolitan Museum of Art from 1974 to 1989. Since 1972, she has conducted archaeological excavations throughout the Middle East, including projects in Syria, Turkey, Cyprus, Iran, and Iraq. In 2019 she began directing new excavations at the site of Lagash in southern Iraq.

== Education and career ==
Pittman began her undergraduate career at Bryn Mawr College, where she was first interested in chemistry and later studied ancient history. She completed her BA at Binghamton University and received her MA (1976) and PhD from Columbia University in 1990. She studied with Dr. Edith Porada in the Department of Art History and Archaeology at Columbia and wrote a dissertation, Glazed Steatite Glyptic Style: The Structure and Function of an Image System, which was awarded distinction. While studying at Columbia, Pittman also worked as a curator of Ancient Near Eastern Art at the Metropolitan Museum of Art.

In 1989, Pittman joined the History of Art Department at the University of Pennsylvania as an associate professor. From 2000 to 2009 she was the College for Women Class of 1963 Endowed Term Professor in the Humanities and was the History of Art Departmental Chair. In 2010 she became the Bok Family Professor in the Humanities. Pittman also serves as a curator in the Near Section of the University of Pennsylvania Museum of Archaeology and Anthropology. She was the director of the Center for Ancient Studies from 1996 to 1999 and 2003 to 2007, for which she is now a member of the Executive Committee.

== Excavations ==
Holly Pittman has conducted excavations in Cyprus, Turkey, Syria, Iran, and Iraq. Most notably she worked at the site of Konar Sandal near Jiroft in south-central Iran from 2004 to 2008, which revealed a previously unknown Early Bronze Age civilization with connections to the Indus Valley, Mesopotamia, and Central Asia. In 2019, she reinitiated excavations at the site of Lagash in southern Iraq.

== Research and publications ==
Pittman is best known for her work on glyptic art and she has published extensively on 3rd millennium seals and sealings and Early Bronze Age administrative systems. She has edited and contributed to several volumes on the art and archaeology of the Near East as well as publications related to exhibitions. Since 2007, Pittman has directed the Al-Hiba Publication Project.

== Museum Curation ==
=== At the Penn Museum ===
==== Middle East Galleries: Journey to the City (2017–present) ====
Holly Pittman worked with a team of 10 curators and 16 conservators to create the Penn Museum's new permanent Middle East Galleries. It took three years to curate this large exhibit which spans 7,000 years of human history, from the earliest cities to today's modern metropolises. Pittman went on record stating that one of her favorite objects in the gallery is a translucent obsidian bowl which demonstrates remarkable craftsmanship. She remarked that “Through these galleries we are trying to tell the story of humanity, of people who were not so different from you or me.”

==== Iraq's Ancient Past: Discoveries from the Ur's Royal Cemetery (2009–2017) ====
Incorporating many of the same artifacts as "Treasures from the Royal Tombs of Ur", Pittman and co-curator Richard L. Zettler reinterpreted the excavations at Ur in the special exhibit “Iraq’s Ancient Past: Discoveries from the Ur’s Royal Cemetery”. Like the exhibit's previous iteration, it includes several objects which the art critic and former Metropolitan Museum of Art Director Thomas Hoving called “the finest, most resplendent and magical works of art in all of America.” In addition, the exhibit brings together the ancient past and the present by exploring pressing issues of preserving Iraq's cultural heritage during the country's ongoing military conflicts.

==== Treasures from the Royal Tombs of Ur (Traveling Exhibit) (1993–2003) ====
Together with Penn Museum curator Richard L. Zettler, Pittman curated this traveling exhibit which displayed more than 200 ancient Sumerian artifacts from the city of Ur. These objects, many of which are now on display in the Penn Museum's permanent Middle East Galleries, include the so-called “Ram in a Thicket”, and Queen Puabi’s elaborate headdress. The artifacts visited eight cities, including Chicago, Illinois and Knoxville, Tennessee, before returning to the Penn Museum in 2001.

=== At the Metropolitan Museum of Art ===
==== Ancient Art in Miniature: Exhibition of Cylinder and Stamp seals in the collection of Martin Cherkasky (1987) ====
Pittman curated this exhibit following the Met’s acquisition of 250 stamp and cylinder seals from donors Martin and Sarah Cherkasky. The exhibit, which included both the recently donated seals and a selection from the Met’s permanent collection, highlighted the importance of stamp and cylinder seals in the study of the art and archaeology of the ancient Near East. The use of stamp seals preceded writing in Near Eastern society, and they were the major form of seal used beginning in 6th century BC.

==== Assyrian Relief Galleries (1979) ====
Working with co-curators Vaughn Crawford and Prudence Harper, Pittman curated this exhibit as the first stage in the reinstallation of the Met's permanent Ancient Near Eastern Art galleries. This gallery includes the Assyrian relief sculptures from the palace of Ashurnasirpal II. Notably, they are positioned as they would have been displayed in his palace in Nimrud.

==== Ancient Near East Galleries (1978) ====
Working with a team of several co-curators, Pittman reimagined the display of the Met’s Ancient Near Eastern art collection after retrieving them from storage following the construction of the Lila Acheson Wallace Galleries of Egyptian Art.

==== Scythian Treasures from the Hermitage (1975) ====
As an assistant for her first curatorial efforts, Pittman helped curate this exhibit which displayed renowned Scythian gold objects as well as important bronze, wood, leather, and felt artworks. The exhibit received positive reviews from the New York Times, which recognized leather cutout figures of elks and the felt swan of the fifth century B.C. as especially interesting artworks.

== Selected publications ==
- Pittman, Holly. “The First Cities.” Journey to the City: A Companion to the Middle East Galleries at the Penn Museum. Steve Tinney and Karen Sonik, eds., 45–64.
- Hatfield, Gary, and Holly Pittman, editors. Evolution of Mind, Brain, and Culture. University of Pennsylvania Press, 2013.
- Madjidzadeh, Youssef, and Holly Pittman. "Excavations at Konar Sandal in the region of Jiroft in the Halil Basin: first preliminary report (2002–2008)." Iran 46.1 (2008): 69–103.
- Pittman, Holly. The Glazed Steatite Glyptic Style : the Structure and Function of an Image System In the Administration of Protoliterate Mesopotamia. Berlin: D. Reimer, 1994.
- Pittman, Holly, and Joan Aruz. Ancient Art In Miniature: Near Eastern Seals From the Collection of Martin and Sarah Cherkasky. New York: The Metropolitan Museum of Art, 1987.
- Pittman, Holly, and Edith Porada. Art of the Bronze Age: Southeastern Iran, Western Central Asia, and the Indus Valley. Metropolitan Museum of Art, 1984.
