= Joukowsky Institute for Archaeology and the Ancient World =

Research and teaching center in Brown University

Coordinates: 41.82515°N 71.39999°W

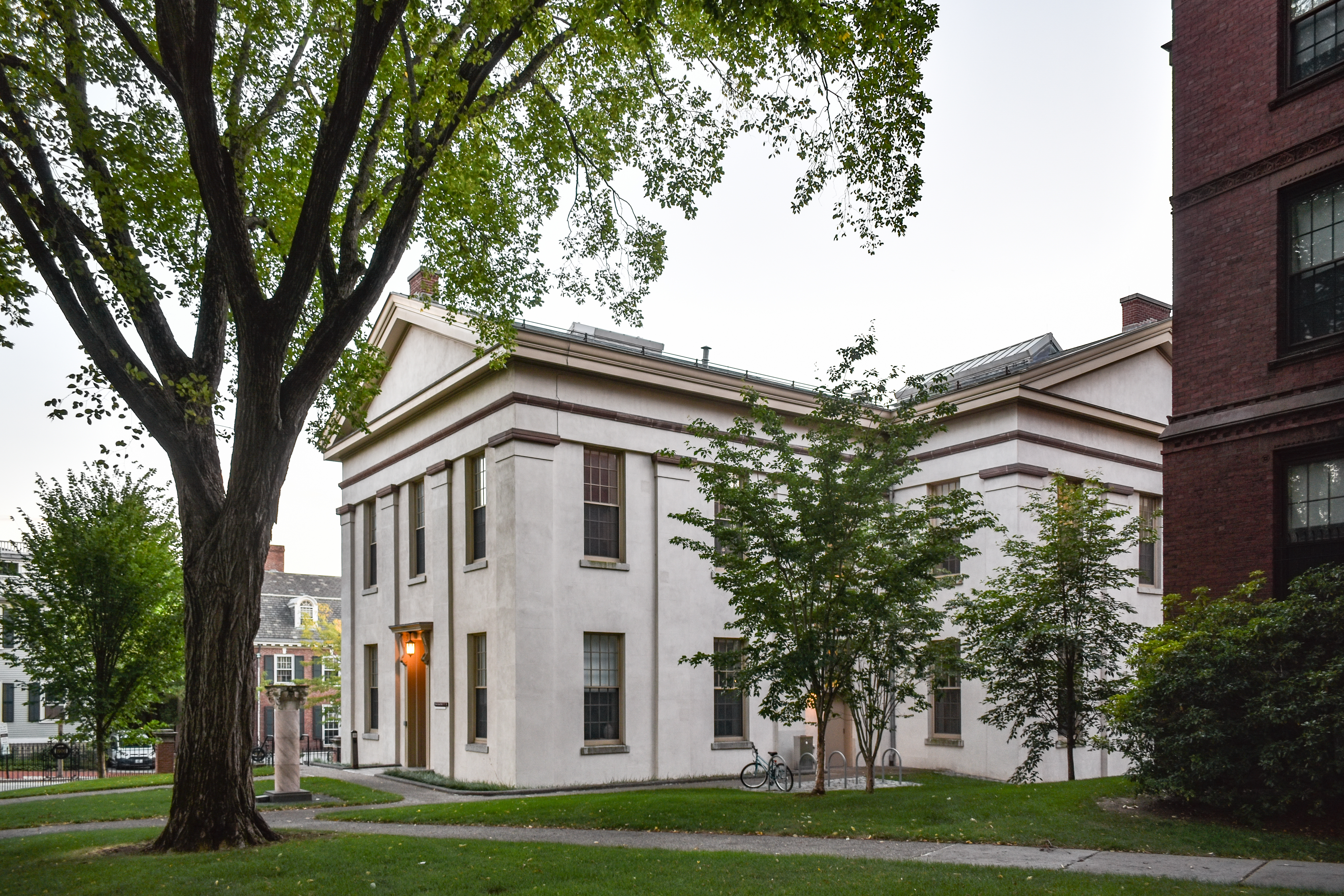
- Rhode Island Hall, home of the Joukowsky Institute
- Established: 2004; 21 years ago
- Director: Andrew Scherer
- Location: Providence, RI

The Joukowsky Institute for Archaeology and the Ancient World is an interdisciplinary center at Brown University focused on research and teaching of archaeology, with an emphasis on the archaeology and art of the ancient Mediterranean, Egypt, and the Near East. Brown's undergraduate and graduate programs in archaeology are organized through the institute.

== History ==
The Joukowsky Institute was established in 2004, with an eight–figure gift from Artemis Joukowsky and Martha Sharp Joukowsky. Artemis had previously served as the university's Chancellor while Martha was professor emerita of Old World Archaeology and Art.

The Institute continued and expanded the activities of Brown's former Center for Old World Archaeology and Art (COWAA), which Sharp Joukowsky directed until her retirement in 2004. COWAA was founded in 1978 by R. Ross Holloway, professor of classics and Rudolf Winkes, historian of ancient Roman art. Martha Sharp Joukowsky joined the faculty soon after its establishment and expanded the center's scope to include the Middle East.

In 2006, Susan E. Alcock began as the institute's inaugural director Peter van Dommelen succeeded Alcock, becoming Director of the Institute in July 2015. The current director, Andrew Scherer, has been Director of the Institute since July 2023.

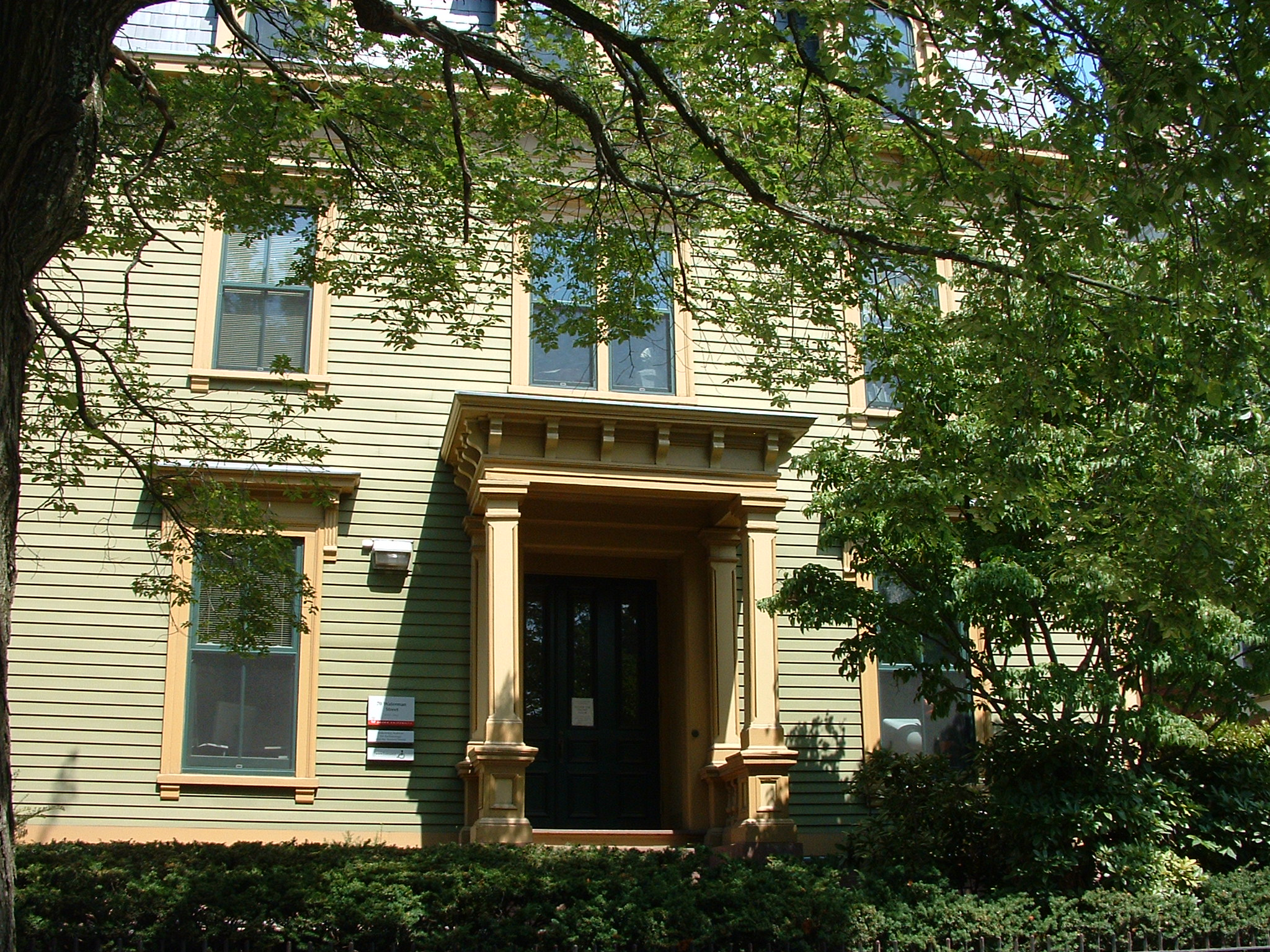
70 Waterman St, the original location of the institute

The institute began in 70 Waterman St, a facility renovated for use with funding from the Joukowskys in 1981. Beginning in 2006, Rhode Island Hall, on Brown's Main Green was extensively renovated for use by the institute. Led by Anmahian Winton Architects, the renovation cost a total of $12 million; the building opened in September 2009.

The Joukowsky Institute holds its own collection of several thousand archeological objects, independent from the Haffenreffer Museum of Anthropology. Among these items are a numismatic collection and materials excavated by Brown archeologists at Petra in Jordan. In November and December 2020, during the COVID-19 pandemic, the Institute held a series of online lectures themed around epidemics and pandemics in Antiquity.

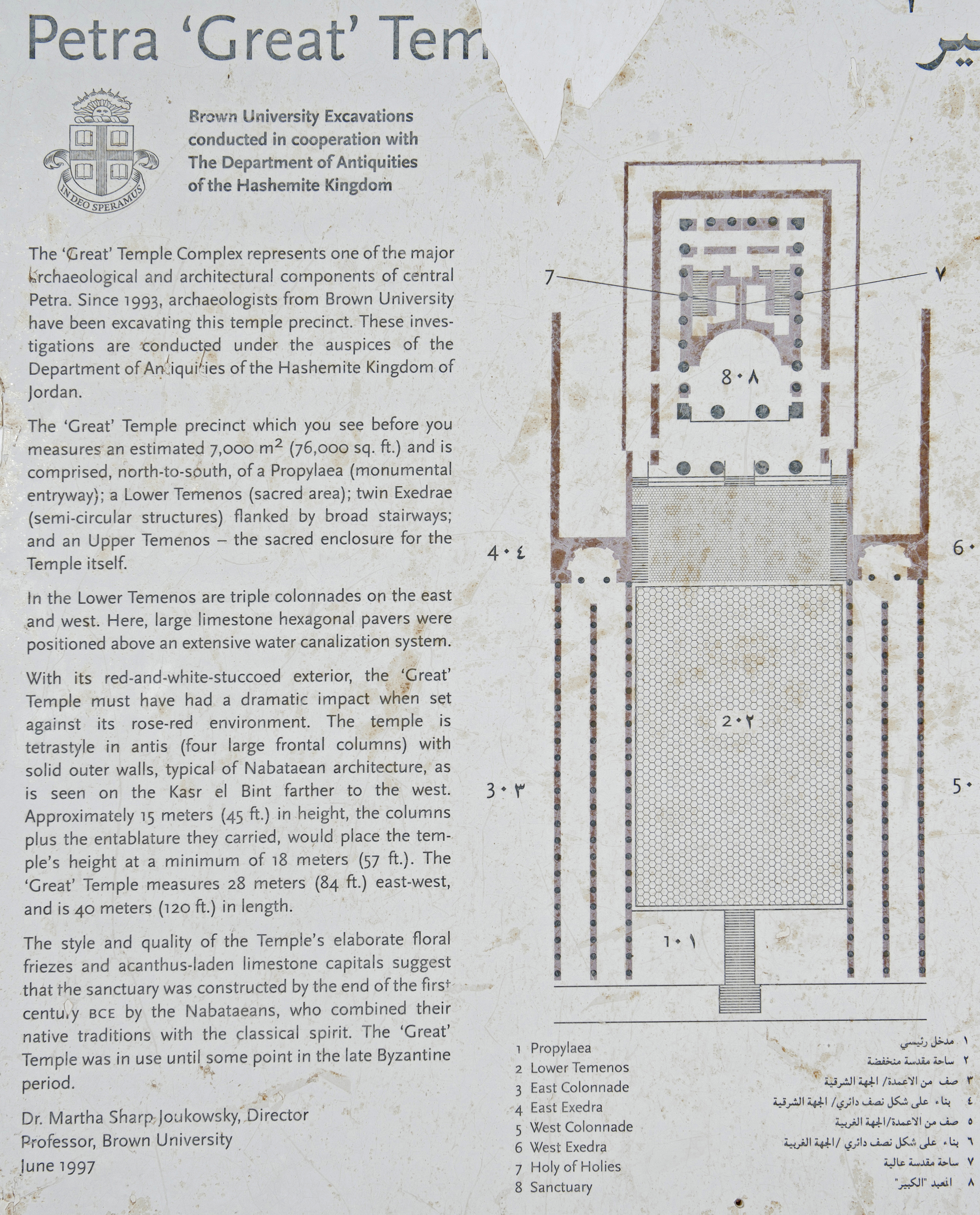
A plaque from Petra describing excavations by Brown researchers

== Core faculty ==
Andrew Scherer is director of the institute, having succeeded Peter van Dommelen in 2023. The inaugural director of the institute was Susan E. Alcock, who was director from 2006 to 2015. Other notable faculty include James P. Allen, John F. Cherry, Yannis Hamilakis, Johanna Hanink, Susan Ashbrook Harvey, and Stephen D. Houston.

== Current fieldwork ==
- Archaeology of College Hill, Providence, RI (2006–)
- Brown University Abydos Project, Egypt
- Brown University Labraunda Project, Turkey
- Brown University Petra Terraces Archaeological Project, Jordan
- Koutroulou Magoula Archaeology and Archaeological Ethnography Project, Greece
- MonArch: Wesleyan-Brown Monastic Archaeology Project, Soissons, France (1982–)
- Notion Archaeological Survey, Turkey
- Proyecto Paisaje Piedras Negras-Yaxchilan, Guatemala
- The S'Urachi Project: Cultural Encounters and Everyday Life around a Nuraghe in Classical and Hellenistic Times, Sardinia, Italy
- Survey and Landscape Archaeology on Montserrat, West Indies
- Uronarti Regional Archaeology Project, Sudan

== Publications ==
The Joukowsky Institute's publication series, Joukowsky Institute Publications (JIP), operates under the general editorship of Professor John F. Cherry. The first book in the series (JIP I) was published by Oxbow Books in December 2009. The series succeeds “Archaeologia Transatlantica,” published by the Center for Old World Archaeology and Art between 1981 and 2004.

- Counts, Derek B.; Tuck, Anthony S., eds. (2009). Mediterranean Studies in Honor of R. Ross Holloway. Joukowsky Institute Publications. Vol. 1. Oxbow Books. ISBN 9781842173794.
- Bonde, Sheila; Houston, Stephen, eds. (2013). Re-Presenting the Past: Archaeology through Text and Image. Joukowsky Institute Publications. Vol. 2. Oxbow Books. doi:10.2307/j.ctvh1dr6h. ISBN 9781782972310.
- Moser, Claudia; Feldman, Cecelia, eds. (2014). Locating the Sacred: Theoretical Approaches to the Emplacement of Religion. Joukowsky Institute Publications. Vol. 3. Oxbow Books. doi:10.2307/j.ctvh1dqff. ISBN 9781782976165.
- Campbell, Roderick, ed. (2014). Violence and Civilization: Studies of Social Violence in History and Prehistory. Joukowsky Institute Publications. Vol. 4. Oxbow Books. doi:10.2307/j.ctvh1dscc. ISBN 978-1782976202.
- Harmansah, Ömür, ed. (2014). Of Rocks and Water: Towards an Archaeology of Place. Joukowsky Institute Publications. Vol. 5. Oxbow Books. doi:10.2307/j.ctvh1dt5x. ISBN 9781782976714.
- Rutz, Matthew T.; Kersel, Morag M., eds. (2014). Archaeologies of Text: Archaeology, Technology, and Ethics. Joukowsky Institute Publications. Vol. 6. Oxbow Books. ISBN 9781782977667.
- Cherry, John F.; Rojas, Felipe, eds. (2015). Archaeology for the People. Joukowsky Institute Publications. Vol. 7. Oxbow Books. ISBN 9781785701078.
- Anderson, Benjamin; Rojas, Felipe, eds. (2017). Antiquarianisms: Contact, Conflict, Comparison. Joukowsky Institute Publications. Vol. 8. Oxbow Books. doi:10.2307/j.ctvh1dmc4. ISBN 9781785706844.
- Miguel Ángel Cau Ontiveros; Catalina Mas Florit, eds. (2019). Change and Resilience: The Occupation of Mediterranean Islands in Late Antiquity. Joukowsky Institute Publications. Vol. 9. Oxbow Books. ISBN 9781789251807.

== See also ==
- Outline of archaeology
- Petra
- Graduate Group in the Art and Archaeology of the Mediterranean World at the University of Pennsylvania
