= Lothar Haselberger =

Lothar Haselberger is a German-American academic architectural historian, archaeologist, classical scholar and author. He is the Morris Russell and Josephine Chidsey Williams Professor in Roman Architecture at the University of Pennsylvania in the Department of the History of Art and the Graduate Group in the Art and Archaeology of the Mediterranean World. He is Corresponding Member of the German Archaeological Institute and serves in the external review boards of its Jahrbuch and Römische Mitteilungen. Haselberger received his Ph.D. in Engineering from the Technical University of Munich.

== Bibliography ==
- Mapping Augustan Rome, principal investigator and author. Portsmouth: Journal of Roman Archaeology, suppl. 50 (revised edition, 2008).
- Imaging Ancient Rome: Documentation – Visualization – Imagination. Third Williams Symposium on Classical Architecture; editor, together with John Humphrey. Portsmouth: Journal of Roman Archaeology, suppl. 61 (2006).
