= John F. Cherry =

British-American prehistorian and archaeologist

John F. Cherry is a British-American prehistorian and archaeologist, specialising in Aegean prehistory and survey archaeology. He is Joukowsky Family Professor in Archaeology and Professor of Classics at the Joukowsky Institute for Archaeology and the Ancient World at Brown University. He previously taught at the University of Cambridge and the University of Michigan.

== Early life and education ==
From 1966 to 1969, he studied Latin and Greek at the University of Bristol, graduating with a first class honours Bachelor of Arts (BA) degree. He then studied classical archaeology at the University of Texas at Austin, graduating with a Master of Arts (MA) degree in anthropology in 1973. Returning to England, he studied for a Doctor of Philosophy (PhD) degree at the University of Southampton: his supervisor was Colin Renfrew, and his doctoral thesis was titled "Diachronic island archaeology in the Aegean: a case study on Melos " (1981).

== Academic career ==
Cherry started his teaching career as a junior research fellow and lecturer at the University of Sheffield between 1978 and 1980. In 1980, he joined the Faculty of Classics, University of Cambridge as an assistant lecturer in classical archaeology. He was elected a Fellow of Fitzwilliam College, Cambridge in 1981, and was Tutor and Director of Studies in Classics and in Archaeology & Anthropology at the college until he left Cambridge. In 1985, he was promoted to lecturer in classical archaeology, and taught Aegean prehistory. As a doctoral supervisor, his students included John Bennet (completed 1986), Sturt Manning (completed 1995) and Cyprian Broodbank (completed 1996).

In 1993, Cherry moved to the University of Michigan where he had been appointed Professor of Classical Archaeology and Greek. From 1994 to 2005, he was director of Michigan's Interdepartmental Program in Classical Art and Archaeology. He was also Curator of the Kelsey Museum of Archaeology between 2002 and 2005. Among his doctoral students at Michigan were John Robb (completed 1995), Joseph L. Rife (completed 1999), Camilla MacKay (completed 1999), Bryan E. Burns (completed 1999), and Josephine Shaya (completed 2002).

In 2006, he moved to Brown University as a professor of the Joukowsky Institute for Archaeology and the Ancient World. He was appointed Joukowsky Family Professor of Archaeology in 2008. He teaches courses on Mediterranean archaeology, Classical archaeology, and archaeological theory.

Cherry co-edited the journal World Archaeology from 1988 to 1997, and has been co-editor of the Journal of Mediterranean Archaeology since 1990.

=== Research ===
He currently co-directs the Survey and Landscape Archaeology on Montserrat project (SLAM) in the West Indies, and has co-directed the Vorotan Project in Southern Armenia and archaeological surveys of Melos, Northern Keos and the Nemea Valley in southern Greece.
