= Philip Betancourt =

American archaeologist (born 1936)

Philip P. Betancourt
- Born: Felipe Pablo Andreas Betancourt; 1936 (age 89–90)
- Education: University of Pennsylvania (PhD)
- Occupations: Archaeologist, educator, author
- Known for: scholar of Aegean Bronze Age
- Children: 2, including John Gregory Betancourt, Michael Betancourt

Philip P. Betancourt (born 1936 as Felipe Pablo Andreas Betancourt) is an American archaeologist, educator, and author. He is a specialist in the Aegean Bronze Age. Betancourt was the Laura H. Carnell Professor of Art History and Archaeology at Temple University's Tyler School of Art, and was an adjunct professor at the University of Pennsylvania in the Graduate Group in the Art and Archaeology of the Mediterranean World and the Department of the History of Art. He previously served as the director of the Institute for Aegean Prehistory.

== Biography ==
Betancourt received his Ph.D. in Archaeology from the University of Pennsylvania. He was elected a Fellow of the American Academy of Arts and Sciences in 2007.

Betancourt's sons are author and publisher John Gregory Betancourt, and artist and critical theorist Michael Betancourt.

== Bibliography ==
- The Origin and Diffusion of Metallic Shaft-hole Implements in the Aegean Early Bronze Age (as Felipe Pablo Betancourt). (1970) University Microfilms International.
- The History of Minoan Pottery. (1985) Princeton University Press. ISBN 0691035792
- Chrysokamino I: The Metallurgy Workshop and its Territory. (2006) American School of Classical Studies. ISBN 0876615361
- Introduction to Aegean Art, 2007
- The Bronze Age Begins: The Ceramics Revolution of Early Minoan I and the New Forms of Wealth that Transformed Prehistoric Society. (2008) INSTAP Academic Press. ISBN 978-1-931534-52-9
