= Richard L. Zettler =

American archaeologist (born 1949)

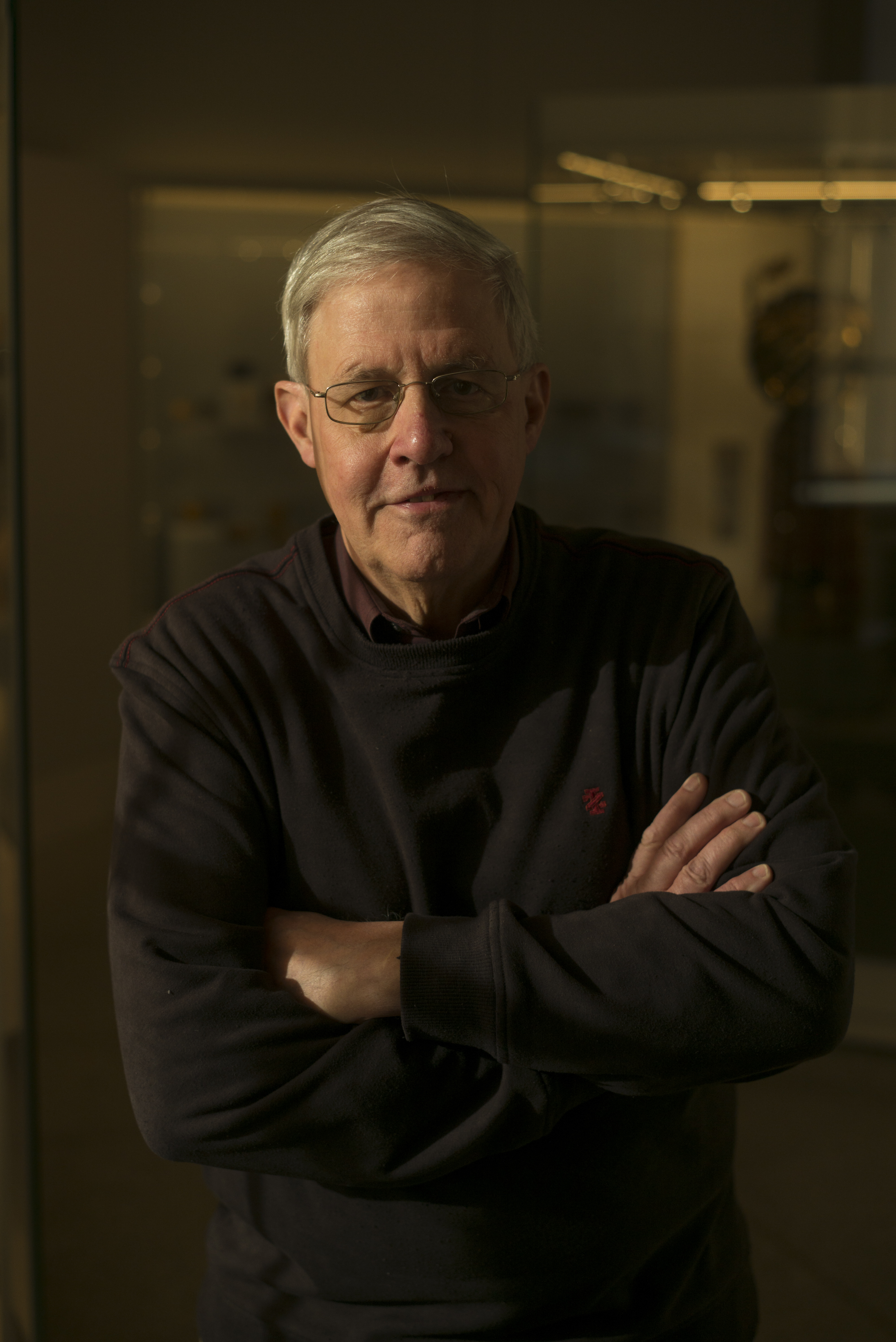
Professor Richard L. Zettler in the Penn Museum

Richard L. Zettler (born 1949) is an American archaeologist of Early Bronze-Age Mesopotamia, with special interests in urban development and the organization of complex societies. At the University of Pennsylvania, he is a professor in the Department of Near Eastern Languages and Civilizations at the University of Pennsylvania and serves as Associate Curator-in-Charge of the Penn Museum’s Near East section. Working in partnership with colleagues from the University of Mosul and with Iraq’s State Board of Antiquities and Heritage, Zettler secured a three-year grant from the U.S. State Department in 2018 to identify and where possible to restore historic structures damaged by the Islamic State (ISIS) fighters who held Mosul from 2014 to 2017. This project has since expanded into the Mosul Heritage Stabilization Program (MHSP), which has also received funds from the Swiss foundation known as the International Alliance for the Protection of Heritage in Conflict Areas (ALIPH).

== Personal life, education, and career ==
Richard Zettler was born in Topeka, Kansas to Dorothy M. Zettler and Richard L. Zettler, Sr., and grew up in Hamilton, Ohio. He earned a B.A. degree from the University of Notre Dame in 1972. He earned his PhD in Near Eastern Languages and Civilizations at the University of Chicago in 1984, for a dissertation entitled, “The Ur III Inanna Temple at Nippur”, which he wrote under the supervision of McGuire Gibson, Miguel Civil, and Helene Kantor. During his doctoral studies, he held a Ryerson Fellowship, the Mesopotamian Fellowship of the American Schools of Oriental Research, a Mrs. Giles Whiting Foundation Fellowship, and a fellowship from the Metropolitan Museum of Art. He taught at the University of California, Berkeley in the 1985-86 year. In 1986, he joined the faculty at the University of Pennsylvania, and was based for many years in the Anthropology Department. He shifted to the Department of Near Eastern Languages and Civilizations (NELC) in 2006, and served as NELC’s chair from 2011 to 2015.

== Research career, publications, and curated exhibits ==
Richard Zettler has conducted archaeological excavations at sites in Syria, Turkey, and Iraq. From 1989 to 2007, he excavated at Tell es-Sweyhat, an Early Bronze Age site occupied from the third millennium BCE. He has published studies and excavation reports on the Ur III Temple of Inanna and Kassite buildings at Nippur, and on settlement patterns in Tell es-Sweyhat. He co-curated the Penn Museum’s traveling exhibition on the “Treasures from the Royal Tomb at Ur”.

Richard Zettler has also written studies on the history of American archaeologists in the late Ottoman and early post-Ottoman Middle East, and on the history of the Penn Museum. One article appeared, for example, in a volume considering the legacies of the first Ottoman director of antiquities, Osman Hamdi Bey, who received an honorary doctorate from Penn. Another examined the Penn Museum’s late nineteenth-century excavations in Nippur – a site at which he himself has conducted extensive research.

== Heritage conservation ==
Within a year of the U.S. invasion of Iraq in 2003, Richard Zettler began to address public concern about the looting of antiquities in Iraq. In an interview with the Philadelphia Inquirer, he expressed concern about the security of standing monuments, including mosques, as well as a reconstructed 2,000-year-old ziggurat at the site of Ur, and an archway at Ctesiphon from 129 B.C. He also expressed concerns about mounds of buried ruins that archaeologists had not yet excavated. National Public Radio interviewed him on the subject of Iraqi antiquities looting as well in 2004. In 2018, Zettler secured a three-year grant from the U.S. State Department to identify and where possible restore cultural heritage sites – including churches, mosques, shrines, museums, and stately homes – that Islamic State forces damaged in and near Mosul, Iraq. With colleagues at the University in Mosul and Iraq’s State Board of Antiquities and Heritage, Zettler also secured funds from the Swiss organization known as the International Alliance for the Protection of Heritage in Conflict Areas (ALIPH). The result is the collaborative project known as the Mosul Heritage Stabilization Program (MHSP).

In 2019 the MHSP began work to restore a nineteenth-century Muslim merchant’s house – the Tutunji House (Beit al-Tutunji), built between 1808 and 1817 – which offers an important example of late Ottoman domestic vernacular architecture. The MHSP established a program to train local workers in carving Mosul marble with Arabesque motifs and Arabic calligraphy – a traditional artisanal craft of the area – to produce relief tiles to adorn the walls.

The MHSP was also planning work on restoring the Yazidi shrine of Lalish, in cooperation with Yazidi community leaders; and on restoring a church, chapel, and other buildings associated with the Chaldean Catholic Monastery of St. George, east of Mosul, in cooperation with monks of the Order of Hormizd.
