= C. Brian Rose =

American archaeologist

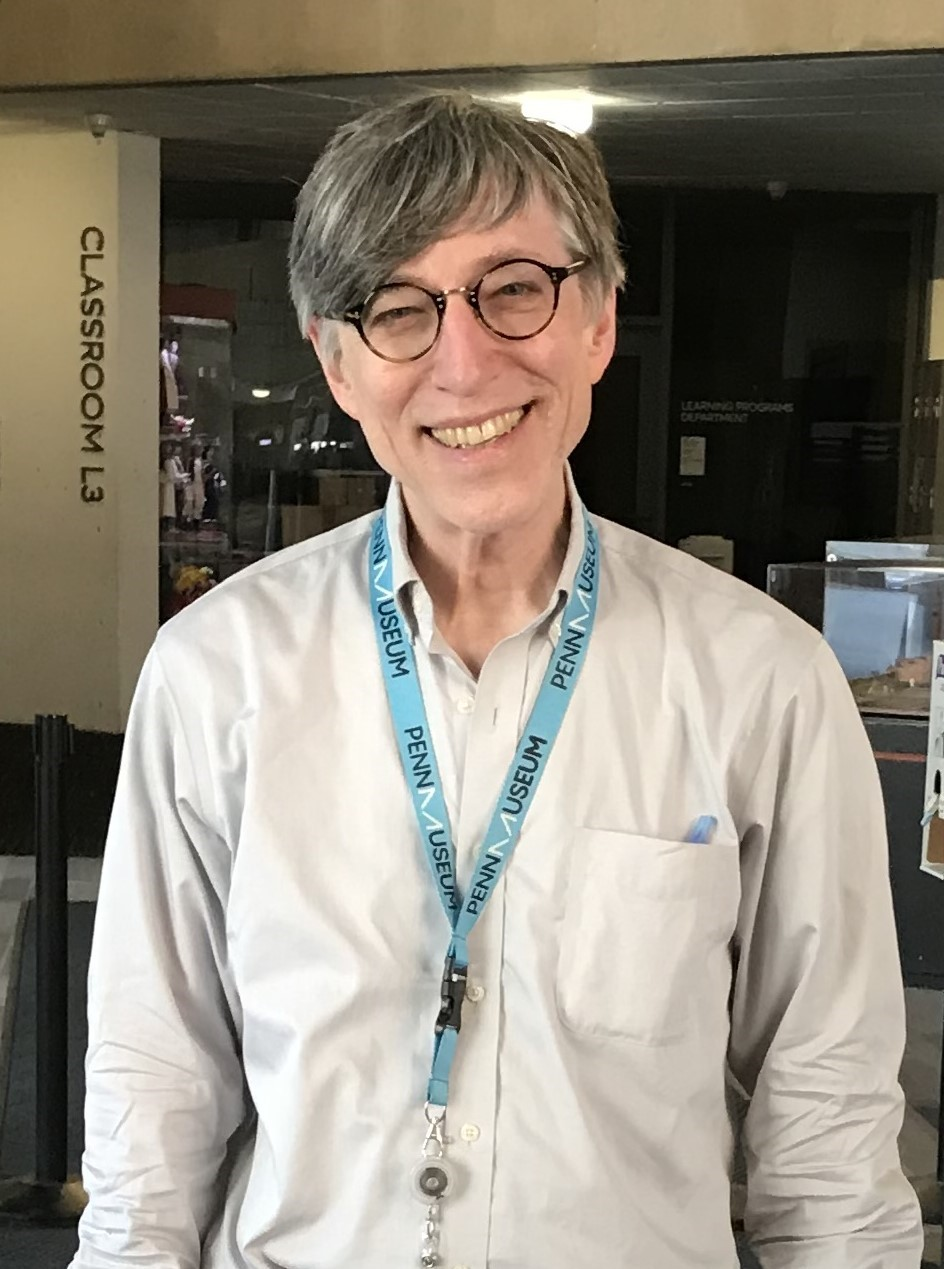
Brian Rose

Charles Brian Rose is an American archaeologist, classical scholar, and author. He is the James B. Pritchard Professor of Archaeology at the University of Pennsylvania in the Classical Studies Department and the Graduate Group in the Art and Archaeology of the Mediterranean World. He is also Peter C. Ferry Curator-in-Charge of the Mediterranean Section of the Penn Museum, and was the museum's Deputy Director from 2008 to 2011. He has served as the President of the Archaeological Institute of America, and currently serves as director for the Gordion excavations and as Head of the Post-Bronze Age excavations at Troy. Between 2003 and 2007 he directed the Granicus River Valley Survey Project, which focused on recording and mapping the Graeco-Persian tombs that dominate northwestern Turkey.

From 1987 to 2005 he taught in the Classics Department at the University of Cincinnati, serving as head of the department from 2002 to 2005, and as Cedric Boulter Professor of Classical Archaeology. He acts as Advisor on History and Global Awareness to Fair Observer, an online magazine covering global issues from a plurality of perspectives. Rose received his B.A. from Haverford College, and his Ph.D. in Art History and Archaeology from Columbia University in 1987 for thesis titled Julio-Claudian dynastic group monuments. He has been a Trustee of the American Academy in Rome (2001–2019), and served as chair of the executive committee of the board of trustees and as vice chair of the board of trustees. In 2017 he was elected President of the American Research Institute in Turkey, a position he held for six years.

Rose received the Gold Medal of the Archaeological Institute of America in 2015. He has also received fellowships from the American Academy in Rome, the American Academy in Berlin, the National Endowment for the Humanities, the American Council of Learned Societies, the Samuel H. Kress Foundation, the Loeb Classical Library Foundation, the Institute for Advanced Study at Princeton, and the American Research Institute in Turkey. In 1994, he and his collaborator, Manfred Korfmann, received the Max Planck Prize of the Alexander von Humboldt Foundation. In 2012 he was elected to the American Academy of Arts and Sciences, and he is a corresponding member of the German Archaeological Institute and the Austrian Archaeological Institute.

His publications have focused on the archaeological sites of Troy and Gordion, and on the political and artistic relationship between Rome and the provinces. For over a decade, Rose offered pre-deployment education and training for armed-forces personnel bound for Iraq and Afghanistan to emphasize cultural heritage awareness and protection. Soldiers learn about the regions’ historical backgrounds, heritage and resources, site recognition, emergency salvage, and conservation. For over a decade he served on the advisory council of the Iraqi Institute for the Conservation of Antiquities and Heritage, and continues to serve on the board of directors of the Council of American Overseas Research Centers (CAORC).

== Bibliography ==
- Dynastic Commemoration and Imperial Portraiture in the Julio-Claudian Period. (1997) Cambridge University Press. ISBN 0521453828
- "Forging Identity in the Roman Republic: Veristic Portraiture and Trojan Ancestry," in the proceedings of the joint American Academy in Rome/British School in Rome conference Role Models: Identity and Assimilation in the Roman World and in Early Modern Italy, Rome, March 2003. (2008) University of Michigan Press, 97–131. ISBN 0472115898
- Charles Brian Rose; G Darbyshire (Eds.). The new chronology of Iron Age Gordion. Philadelphia : University of Pennsylvania Museum of Archaeology and Anthropology, 2011. ISBN 9781934536551.
- The Archaeology of Greek and Roman Troy. Cambridge University Press, 2014. ISBN 9780521762076.
- "The Archaeology of Phrygian Gordion, Royal City of Midas". Philadelphia : University of Pennsylvania Museum of Archaeology and Anthropology, 2012. ISBN 9781934536483.
- Troia 1987–2012. Grabungen und Forschungen I: Forschungsgeschichte, Methoden, und Landschaft, (co-editor with Ernst Pernicka and Peter Jablonka). Habelt Verlag, 2014. ISBN 9783774939028.
- “The Parthians in Augustan Rome,” American Journal of Archaeology 109 (2005), 21–75.
