= Plan de Ayutla (archaelogical site) =

Mayan archaeological site in Chiapas, Mexico

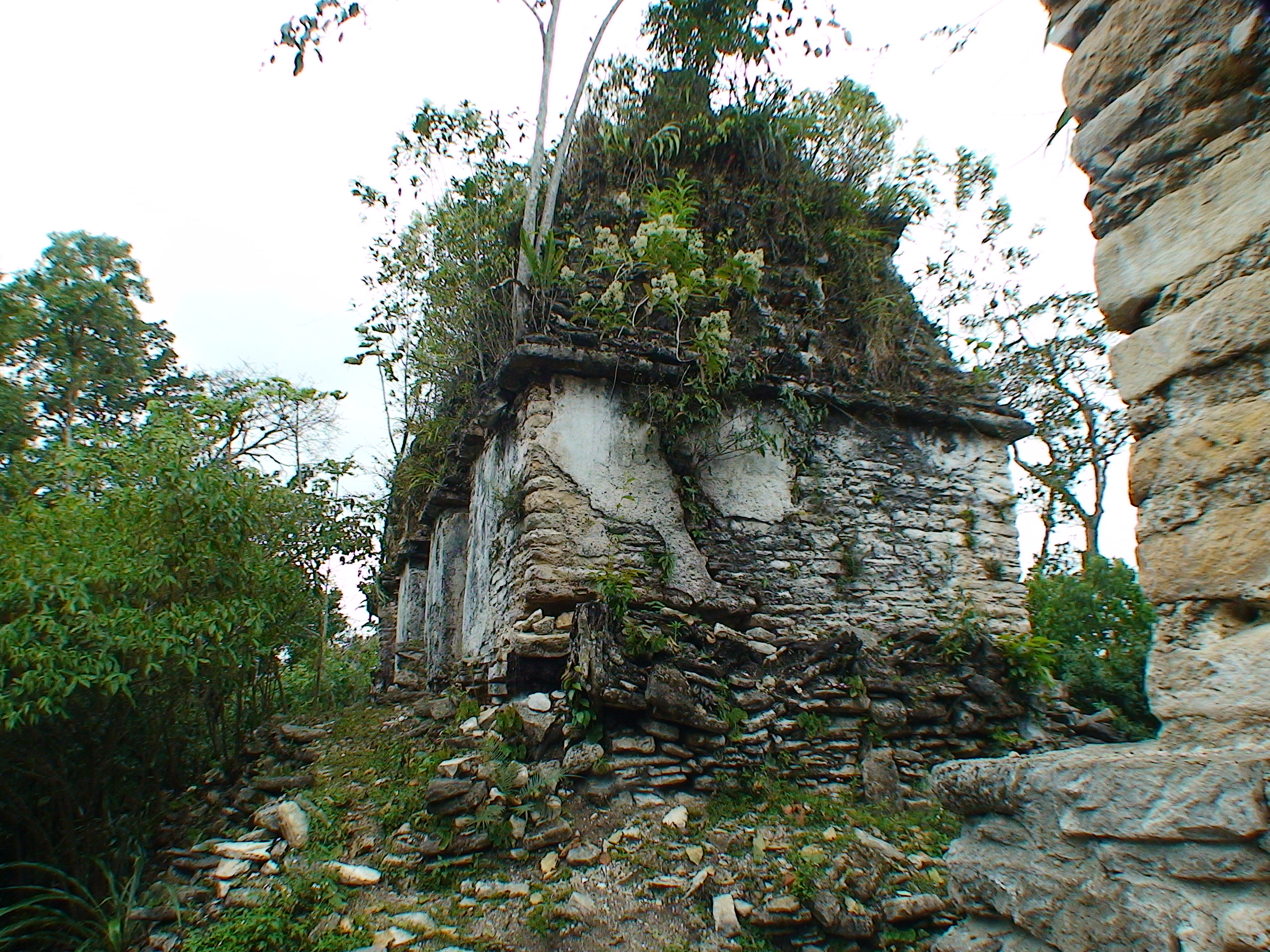
- Structure in the North Acropolis

- Location within Mexico Plan de Ayutla (archaelogical site) (Mexico)
- 16.7850°N 91.2799°W
- Periods: 50 CE to 1100 CE
- Cultures: Maya
- Location: Nueva Palestina, Chiapas, Mexico
- Region: Chiapas

History
- Built: Early Classic
- Abandoned: 1100 CE

Site notes
- Architectural style: Early to Late Classic Maya
- Excavation dates: 2003–2012
- Archaeologists: Luis Alberto Martos López
- Restored by INAH (2008–2012) Responsible body: INAH

Plan de Ayutla, possible ‘Ak’e’ is an archaeological site of the pre-Columbian Maya civilization. It is located in the municipality of Ocosingo of the Mexican state of Chiapas. The ruins are notable for having the earliest urban remains in the Upper Usumacinta region, as well as a unique ancient theater for elite use. The ancient identity of the site is subject to debate.

== Etymology ==
The modern name comes from a nearby Tzeltal community, itself named after the Plan de Ayutla. Alternatively, the site could be the ancient Akʼe, which means "Turtle". Archaeologists previously considered Plan de Ayutla a strong candidate for the ancient site of Sak Tzʼiʼ, meaning "White Dog."

== Location ==
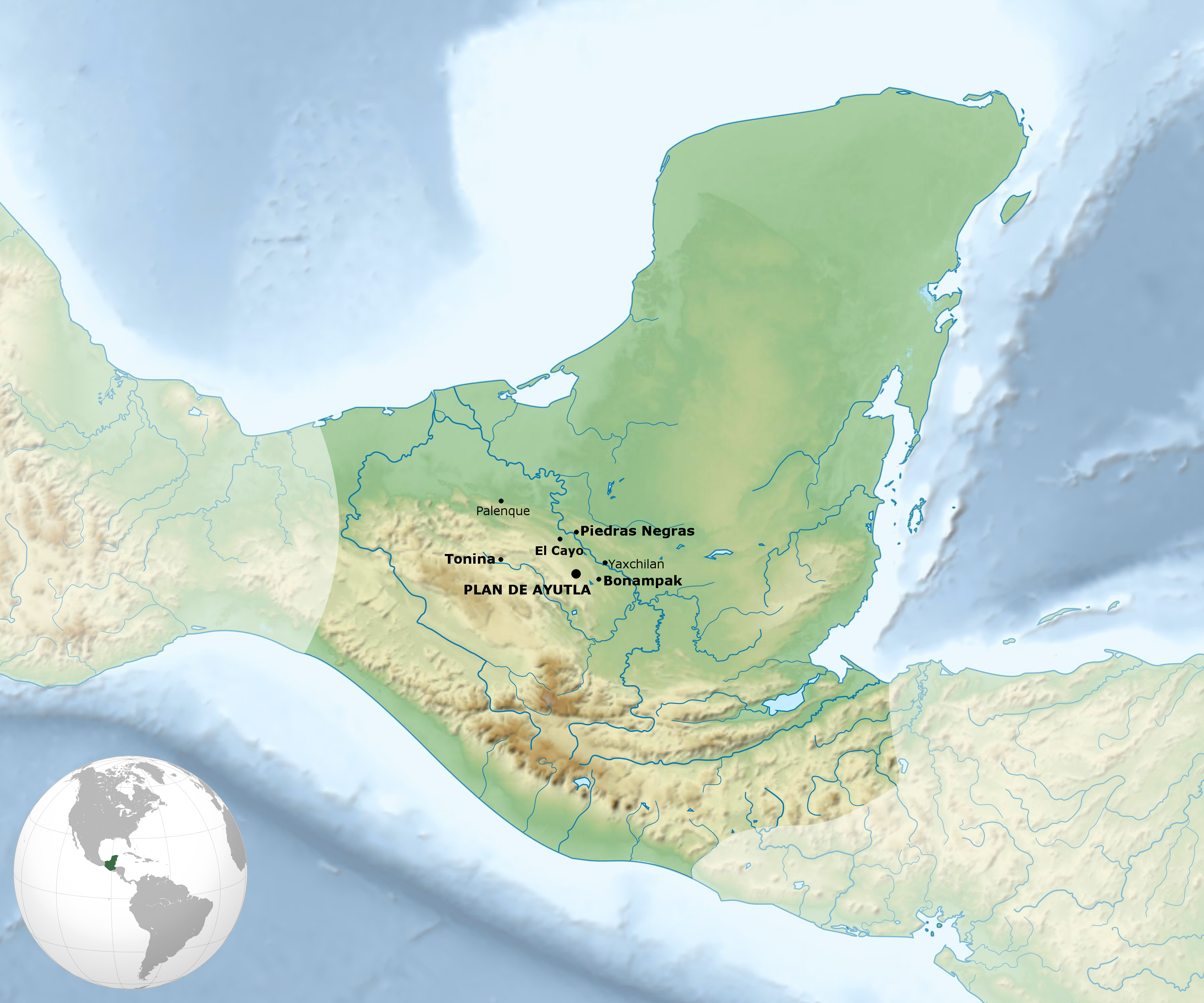
A map of the Upper Usumacinta Maya polities with Plan de Ayutla Bolded

Plan de Ayutla is in the Upper Usumacinta area, about 3.5 km (2.2 mi) from the small community of the same name as the site. It is in a mountainous area of the Lacandon Jungle known as the Sierra de Jalapa. The site is part of the municipality of Ocosingo, State of Chiapas in southeast Mexico, close to the border with Guatemala. It is about 35 km (22 mi) northwest of the Bonampak.

== Identity of the site ==
Archaeologists consider that Plan de Ayutla may be one of two ancient sites known from inscriptions found elsewhere: Ak'e or Sak Tz'i'. So far, no conclusive evidence has been found as to the identity of the site.

=== Identification as Sak Tz'i' (2003 – 2013/2018) ===
The archaeologist who argued and championed the identification of Plan de Ayutla as Sak Tz'i' in a considerably consistent manner was Luis Alberto Martos López, as his investigations in Plan de Ayutla from 2003 to 2013 seemed to confirm the location predicted by Anaya and colleagues.

Ancient Sak Tz'i' was involved in wars with Yaxchilan, Bonampak-Lacanha, Tonina and Piedras Negras. Plan de Ayutla is in a location that is between all these sites.

Sak Tz'i' had important ties to Piedras Negras at several points in its history. Plan de Ayutla's North Acropolis is very similar to the Grand Acropolis of Piedras Negras, which could be an indicator of an important link between the two sites.

=== Identification as Ak'e' (2009/2018 – present) ===
The case for Ak'e takes into account that the identification of Ak'e as the exclusive emblem glyph Bonampak is problematic, and that the ruling dynasty of this city may have come from elsewhere - perhaps Plan de Ayutla - before installing itself at Bonampak. This would explain why Plan de Ayala also shares important architectural features with Tonina, overlord of Bonampak, such as the layout of the ballcourt, column shaped altars and roof ornaments on Structure 13.

Against this theory, archaeologists note that Plan de Ayutla's double-gallery buildings are similar to those of nearby Ojo de Agua and Nuevo Jalisco, and dissimilar to those of Bonampak and its neighbor, Lacanha. These differences may indicate different political entities.

The capital of Sak Tz’i’ (an Ancient Maya kingdom) now named Lacanjá Tzeltal, was revealed by researchers led by associate anthropology professor Charles Golden and bioarchaeologist Andrew Scherer in the Chiapas in the backyard of a Mexican farmer in 2020.

Multiple domestic constructions used by the population for religious purposes. “Plaza Muk’ul Ton” or Monuments Plaza where people used to gather for ceremonies was also unearthed by the team.

== History ==
The first architectural evidence at the site dates from ca. 150 B.C.E., but evidence of an urban settlement appears sometime after ca. 50 B.C.E The discovery of an ancient residential complex dating from somewhere between 50 B.C.E. and 50 C.E. makes Plan de Ayutla the earliest occupied city in the Upper Usumacinta region so far.

If Sak tzʼi was indeed Sak Tzʼiʼ, its history is tied to the political turmoil that was particularly intense in the region between 600 and 800 C.E. A stela from Piedras Negras depicts the capture of Lord Kʼabʼ Chan Teʼ of Sak Tzʼiʼ in 628. Epigraphy around these events is not conclusive. One hypothesis argues for the survival of Kʼabʼ Chan Teʼ as a vassal of Piedras Negras who then aids his new overlord against Bonampak and La Mar in 641. Another theory has Kʼabʼ Chan Teʼ surviving but then retaliating against Piedras Negras, Bonampak and La Mar, defeating at least the latter two sites. To make matters more complicated, the Kʼabʼ Chan Teʼ mentioned 641 may be another ruler of the same name, since Kʼabʼ Chan Teʼ is a recurring name among Sak Tzʼiʼ rulers. In any case, either as a vassal or an opponent of Piedras Negras, Sak Tzʼiʼ ruled a polity extending from at least La Mar to Bonampak in the seventh century.

Aj Sak Maax was the ruler of Sak Tzʼiʼ from the 750s and at least until 772. During his reign, the site of El Cayo appears to be subordinate to both Sak Tzʼiʼ and Piedras Negras. This would place Sak Tzʼiʼ as either an ally or a vassal of Piedras Negras that in turn was lord of El Cayo.

Aj Sak Maax was no longer king in 787 when Yeteʼ Kʼinich of Sak Tzʼiʼ had two of his lords captured in what appears to have been a rebellion by its former vassal Bonampak with assistance from Yaxchilan. These are the events that are commemorated at the famous murals of Bonampak. At some point after 789, Tonina attacked Jatsʼ Tokal Ekʼ Hiix, then ruler of Sak Tzʼiʼ.

Evidence of fine paste ceramics appears at Plan de Ayutla during the last phase of construction around 800–850 AD. These ceramics are associated with Chontal. Around 850 C.E. Plan de Ayutla seems to have been governed by a multepal or ruling council, as was happening in other cities at the time. The destruction of the likely seat of this government may indicate the attempts of a new ruling dynasty to come to power. The last inscription from the region mentions a vassal of yet another Kʼabʼ Chan Teʼ of Sak Tzʼiʼ in 864. The new dynasty must have failed, and the city was abandoned violently between 1000 and 1100 C.E.

=== Rulers of Sak Tzʼiʼ ===
Name	Dates
U Kʼabʼ	c. 564
Kʼabʼ Chan Teʼ I	c. 594–641
Kʼabʼ Chan Teʼ II?	c.653–693
Aj Sak Maax	c.754–772
Yehtʼ Kʼinich	c. 787
Jatsʼ Tokal Ekʼ Hiix	c.796?
Kʼabʼ Chan Teʼ III	c. 864

=== Modern history ===
The site has been known to the Lacandon people for some time. After hearing reports of the site, archaeologist Peter Schmidt was guided by them to Plan the Ayutla. He published the first report of the site in 1975. The site lay ignored by archaeologists until Alejandro Tovalin of the Bonampak project made a new visit in 1994. In 2001 the local community began clearing the jungle around the site hoping to make it attractive to tourists and requested a visit by archaeologists. This led to another visit and eventually to formal excavations starting in 2003 under Luis Alberto Martos López. Tovalín had only reported on the North Acropolis, but in 2004 Martos realized that it was only one of three.

Restoration work began in 2008 and has focused on the North Acropolis and the Ballcourt, with the aim of opening the site to the public in 2012.

== Site description ==
The extent of the site is no more than 24 ha (0.093 sq mi), however, the core is only a third of that. 72 buildings are spread out throughout the site. The core of the site was built around three natural hills that were built up into three acropolises. The intervening spaces between and around them became three main plazas, used for civic and religious activities. These three plazas can be subdivides into seven smaller ones. The better preserved buildings are on the acropolises, while the plazas are surrounded by mounds of rubble and dirt.

The architecture shares affinities with other sites such as Yaxchilan, Palenque, Lacanha and Bonampak but nevertheless also has unique elements. The key example of these is Structure 13 on the North Acropolis (see below).

The site was subjected to heavy looting, which damaged many of the structures. All stelae have been removed and the lack of inscriptions of the site is notable.

=== The West Plaza ===
This plaza is divided into two by two steps and a rectangular building.

- **Plaza Ajkʼol** ("Upper" in the Tzeltal language) is a sunken enclosure between the North and West Acropolises and five buildings to the northwest, with Yolil plaza to the southeast.
- **Structure 18** is a long, narrow terrace on the bottom of the West Acropolis over Plaza Ajkʼol that may have been a wall or a processional way.
- **Plaza Yolil** ("Central") is also bounded by the same Acropolises and a ballcourt (Structure 39) to the southeast which divides it from Plaza Alan.
- **Structure 39**, between Plaza Yolil and Plaza Alan, is the largest ballcourt found so far in the Upper Usumacinta area. It is made up of six buildings and is 65 m (213 ft) in length. It is similar to that of Tonina, and instead of a central ballcourt makers has a single column in the middle. Structure 39 is the center of the site, in between the three acropolises and the three plazas, which indicates its importance.

=== The Central and East Plazas ===
A large plaza occupies the center of the site, with two separate spaces named in Tzeltal: Alan (Lower) and Mukuʼl (Great). Mukuʼl occupies the space between North and East Acropolises. South of Plaza Alan are Plazas Tut (Small) and Bejaʼ (of the Arroyo or stream). The latter is named after a ravine that crosses it. Plaza Tonnaʼ (of the Stone Houses) extends northeast from Plaza Mukuʼl and has four residential complexes around it.

=== The North Acropolis ===
The North Acropolis is a Maya Palace, a complex that includes elite dwellings, temples and spaces for meetings. It was built around a natural hill that was modified to accommodate the structures. The hill measures 45 m (148 ft) in height, and at least 19 structures were built on it. On the north side, a series of four structures on rising terraces makes the acropolis similar to that of Piedras Negras. The presence of fine-paste ceramics and other items on the complex indicates that it was occupied through the Late Classic.

In 2012, a theater dating from the Terminal Classic (ca. 800–900 C.E.) was discovered here. A patio surrounded by buildings dating from 250–500 C.E. was customised to make way for three wide bleachers. The external wall of another structure was demolished to make way for a stage. Judging by its size and location, it was intended for a select group of 120 people at most. The theater may have been part of a program to legitimise a new dynasty at Plan de Ayutla that seems to have come to power around 850 C.E. At the same structure, a bath for a member of the elite was discovered, complete with a drainage system. It is one of only four discovered in Mexico that date from pre-Hispanic times (the others being at Palenque, Tonina and Teotihuacan). Ceramics used to hold water for the bath were discovered in an adjoining room.

Also, in 2011, the remains of an earlier patio surrounded by residential structures were discovered under later buildings of the acropolis, dating from between 50 B.C.E. and 50 C.E. These kind of constructions have not been found at other sites in the region until ca. 250 C.E. The structures have rounded corners, a feature of early Maya architecture. Most of the buildings had their upper parts torn down and used to fill the earlier structure with rubble in order to build the more recent structures.

- On the south side, **Structures 1,2 and 3** tower over the complex. All three had vaulted roofs, a narrow entryway and three inner chambers, and have architectural affinities to Palenque.
- **Structure 4** is on the second terrace from the top. It was built ca. 800 C.E. Metal cooking utensils have been found here dating from 900–1000 C.E., making archaeologists think that this was a kitchen or pantry. Two burials from the same period have been discovered nearby within a modified staircase. One of the remains is female and was buried with female clay figurines and cooking utensils.
- **Structure 6** was an L-shaped building with two temples at its ends. It was apparently the seat of the ruling council that seems to have governed the site for at least part of the Terminal Classic, and was later walled in.

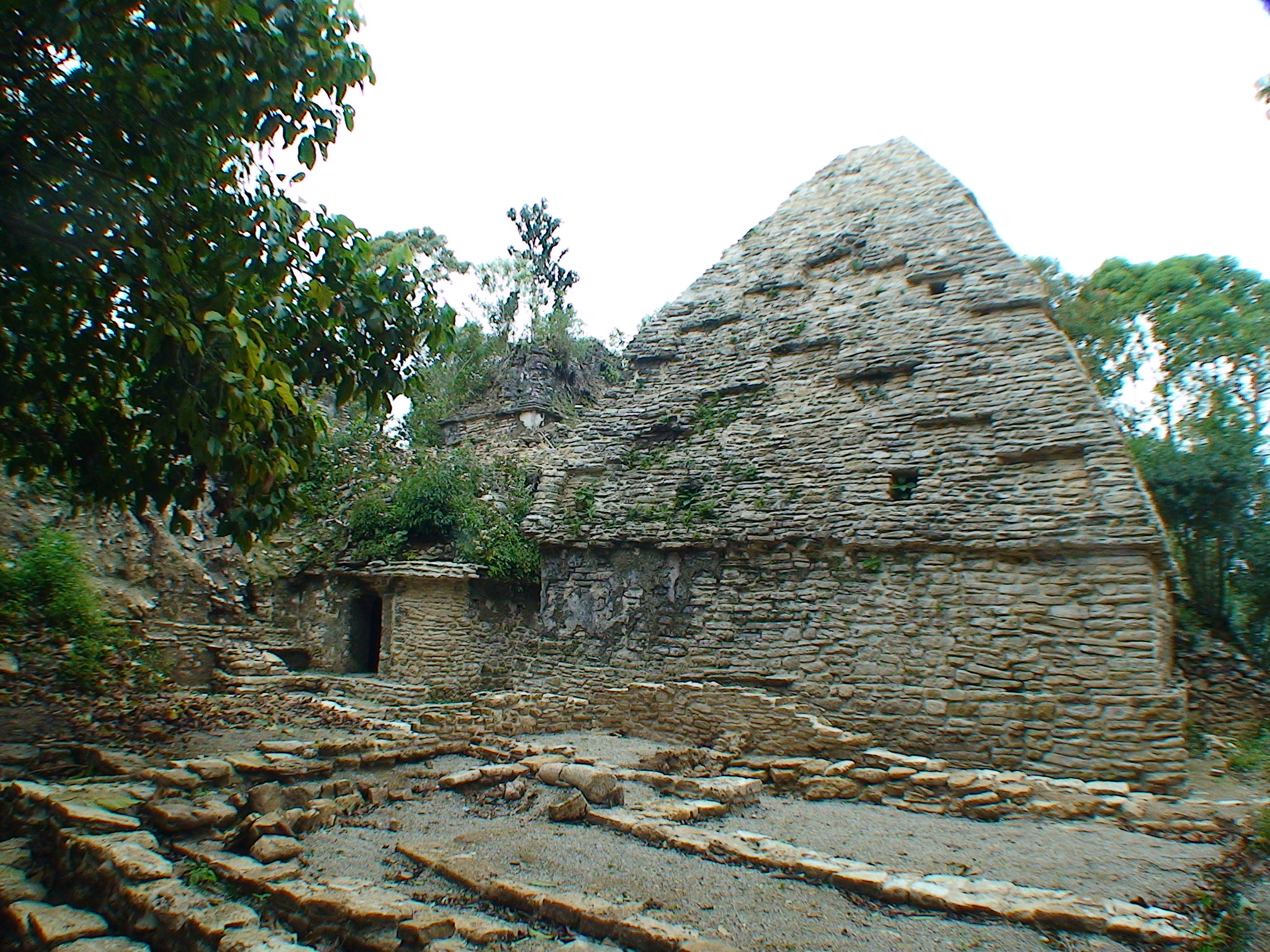
Structure 13. Structure 1 is visible in the background. Note the roof decoration.

- **Structure 13** is a distinctive building dating from the Early Classic. It has one of the tallest vaults discovered in the Maya world, measuring 8 m (26 ft). It was painted in black - a rare color for the inside of buildings among the Maya. The exterior of the roof is decorated with unique stepped patterns. Also, two additional chambers were discovered above the main chambers that may have been a second story or a structural reinforcement. Graffiti on the building show a throne, a lord and the building itself, leading archaeologists to speculate that this was the dwelling of the ruler of Plan de Ayutla. Due to a system of openings, three rectangles of light can be observed on the ceiling of Structure 13 in mid-July, the beginning of the agricultural cycle.

=== The East Acropolis ===
Also built on an adapted natural hill, the acropolis consists of four buildings around a central plaza. Archaeologists suspect that a staircase once descended to the southeast, towards Plaza Tut. A burial has been found at the foot of this possible stairway, with the presence of fine paste ceramics that associate it with the Late Classic. The exact nature of this complex has not been determined, but the massive Structure 58 suggests residential use, while a looted tomb suggests funerary use.

- **Structure 58** is the largest structure on the East Acropolis, on the southwestern side of the plaza. It was probably once a very large vaulted structure. It may have been a residential structure.

=== The West Acropolis ===
The tallest acropolis was built into a ridge that extends from the southwest, and that is 65 m (213 ft) tall at the site of the ruins. The small spaces here lead archaeologists to believe it was for the use of a select elite, while the nature of the structures indicate religious use.

- **Structure 25** is a large temple built on a cross-shaped platform. The inner sanctuary had another gallery built around it at a later construction phase. This makes it similar to the temples of the Cross Group in Palenque.
- **Structure 26** was a large stepped platform accessible from the north by a stairway that no longer exists, with a ruined temple on top of it.
- **Structure 27** is a rectangular building with three entrances.
- **Structure 31** occupies the highest place in the site and contains the only writings found so far on the site. It is a single room building on a three-stepped platform. The base and sides of the building were once adorned with stucco friezes, now badly eroded but on which fragmentary writing can be seen. The western side had the most intact glyphs, but they have so far resisted decipherment. Epigraphers think they be in an early style of writing dating to the Early Classic (ca. 375 C.E.). It has been nicknamed the **Temple of Inscriptions**.
- **Structure 32** was a stepped platform of five levels with a staircase and temple on top of it.
