= Great Temple (Petra) =

Temple complex in Jordan

Coordinates: 30.3288°N 35.4423°E

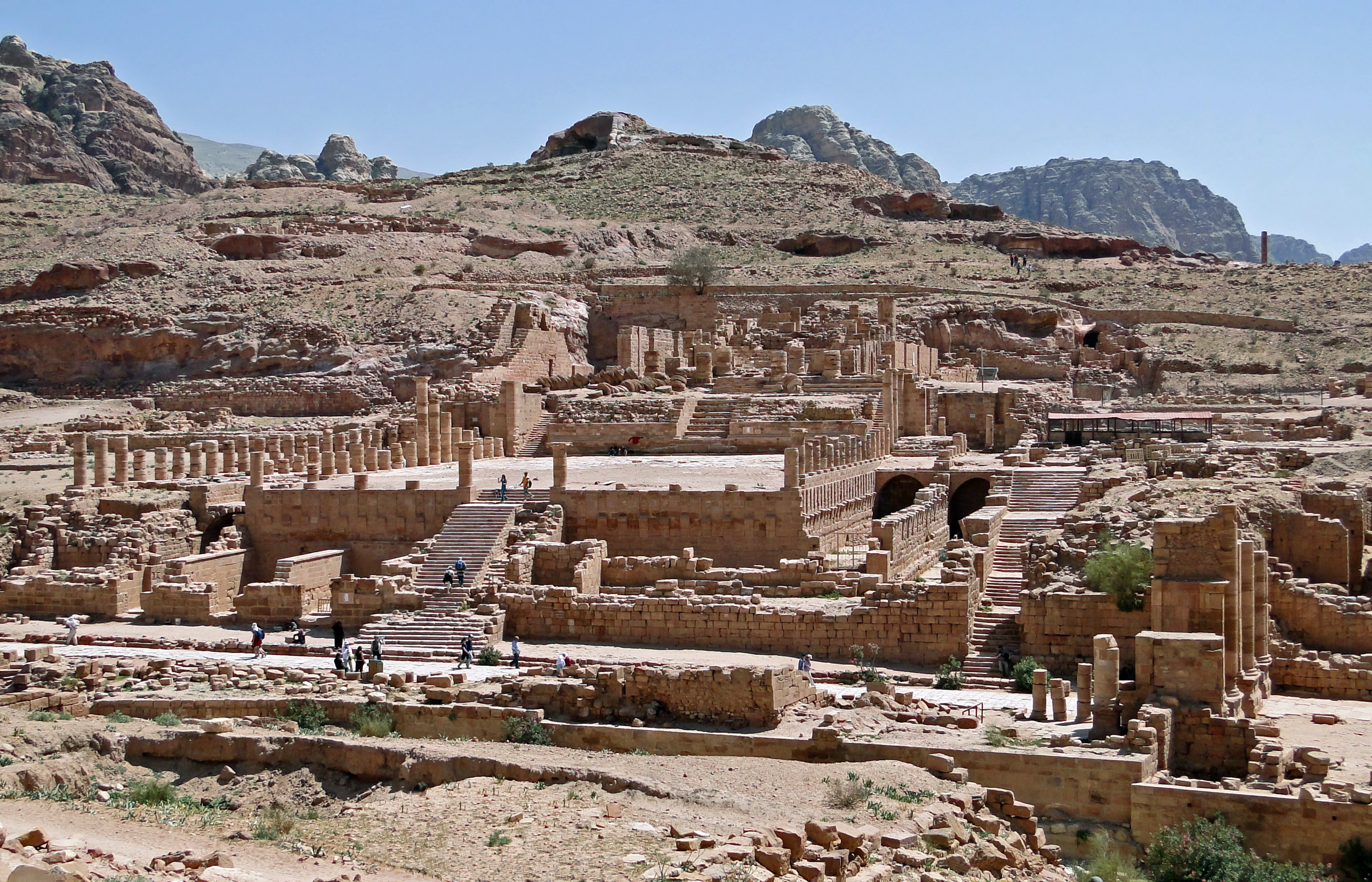
The Great Temple of Petra

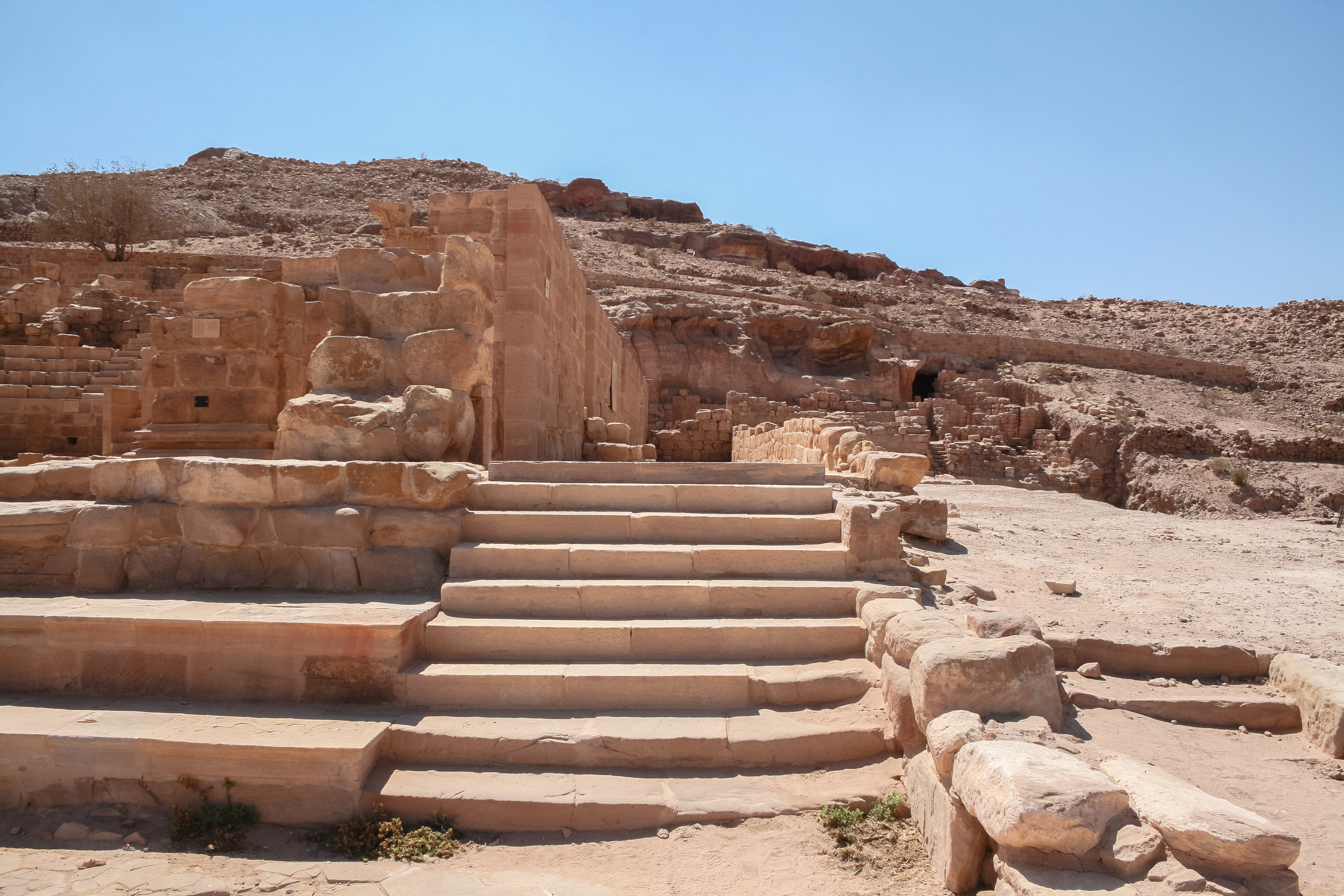
View from the steps in front of it

The Great Temple at Petra is a grand monumental complex that lies south of the Colonnaded Street at Petra. It covers an area of ~7,560 m^{2}. The complex was probably completed in the early first century AD, under the rule of Nabataean king Aretas IV, as suggested by architectural and sculptural details.

The "Great Temple" occupied a prime spot in ancient Petra: from its ruins one can now see the Siq to the Southeast, the Qasr al-Bint to the West, and the Lower Market/Petra Pool Complex to the East. It is unclear whether the complex was a religious or administrative building, and – if it was indeed religious – how exactly it functioned or to what deity it was dedicated.

== History of research ==
In the 1890s, the ruins were superficially explored by German archaeologists R. E. Brünnow and A. von Domaszewski. Walter Bachmann then surveyed Petra as a member of the Preservation branch of the German-Turkish army, and was the first scholar to identify the monument by its current name in his 1921 revision of the Petra city plan. Martha Sharp Joukowsky of Brown University initiated archaeological excavations in 1993 and her team's research has informed the bulk of scholarly interpretations.

== Architecture ==
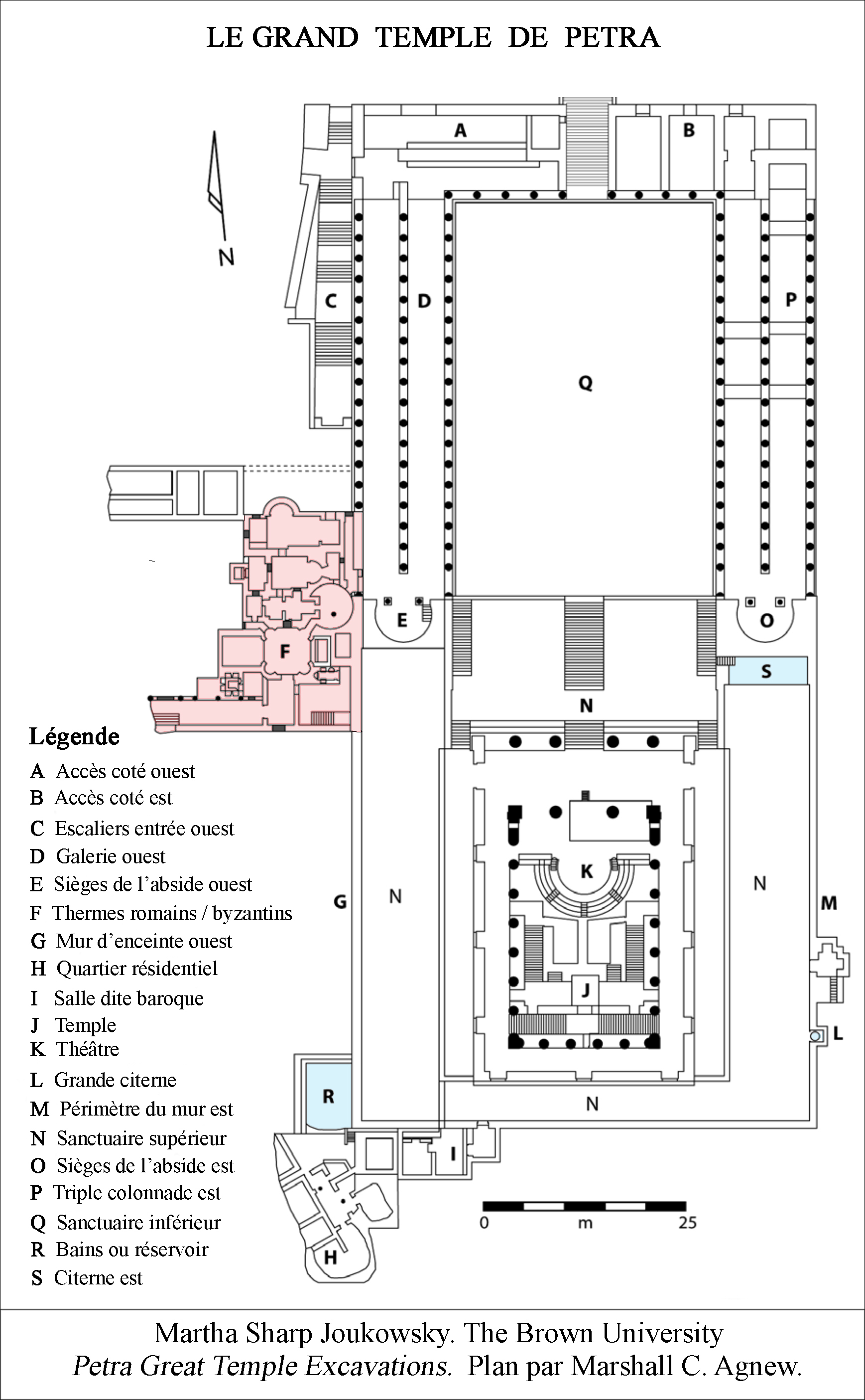
Plan of the Great Temple

The Great Temple is a rectangular complex aligned on a northeast–southwest axis.

From the colonnaded street, one ascends about ~8 m up a flight of stairs that is about 17 m wide into the Propylaeum. This monumental stairway was altered both immediately after the building of the Great Temple and during the construction of the Colonnaded Street in ca. 76 CE. The Propylaeum and street sit at ~8 m under the Lower Temenos, which itself is 6 m beneath the Upper Temenos and the bulk of the temple. The "temple" proper lies immediately south of the Upper Temenos.

Two exedra (semicircular recesses with benches) lie to the east and west of the monumental stairway that joins the Lower and Upper Temenos. The temple itself was built with four frontal columns stuccoed in red, yellow, and white for stark contrast against the sandstone environment, and would hypothetically have stood at 20m. Such a height is comparable to that of the Qasr al-Bint's current 23 m, but not as grand as the Khazneh/Treasury, whose facade reaches 39 m. A theater-like structure (theatron) with about 600 seats dominates the interior of the temple beyond the Upper Temenos, where traces of extensive decoration remain in gold leaf and colored stucco.

Water management also plays a significant role in the architecture of the "Great Temple," as two sizable cisterns of 59 m^{3} and 327 m^{3} (approximately 59,000 and 327,000 liters' capacity respectively) have been found. The cisterns feed into a subterranean canalization system, which runs the length of the temple and then joins the citywide water distribution system. These channels may then have led to the Qasr al Bint and Wadi Siyagh.

== Significant finds ==
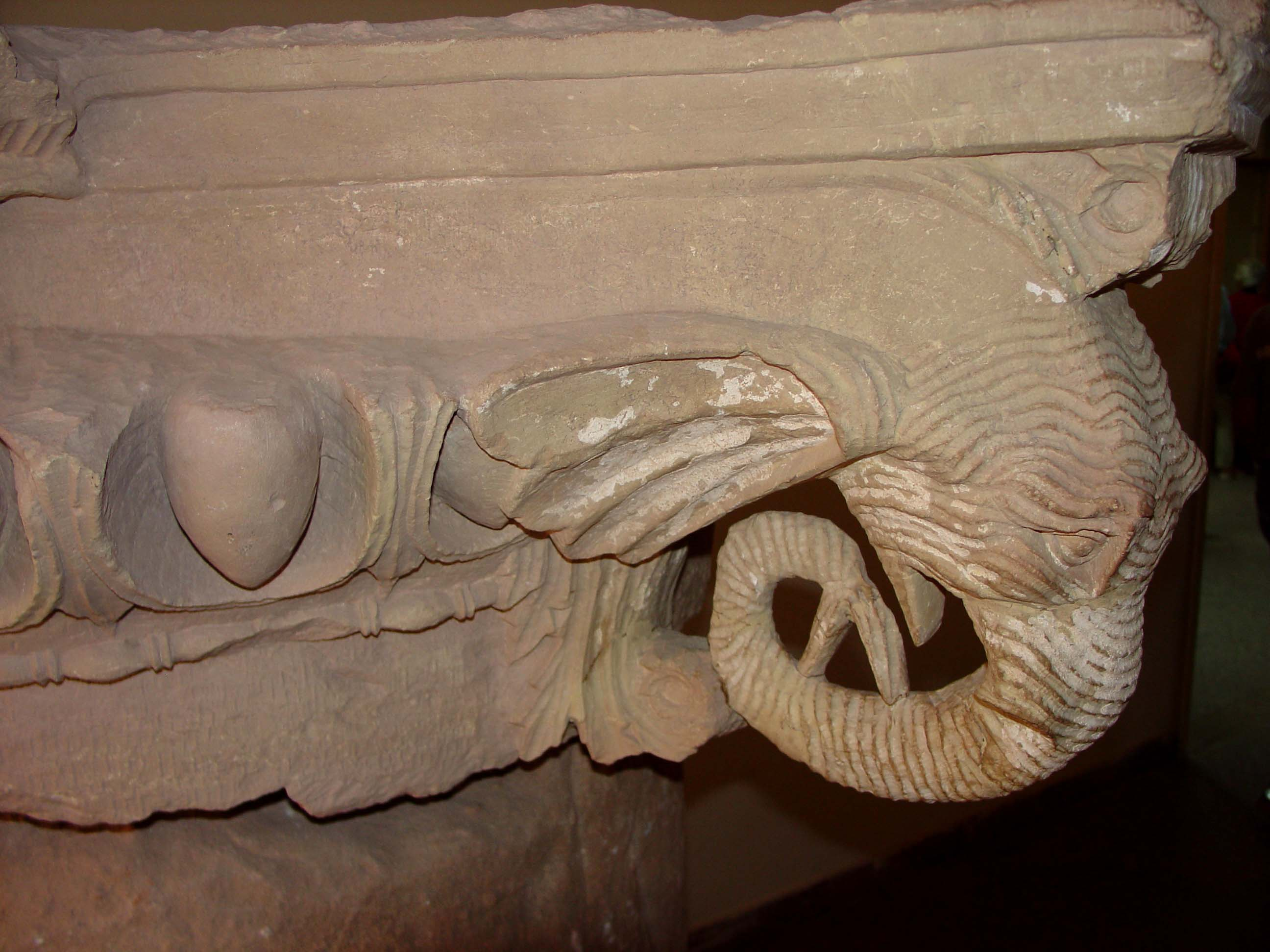
Elephant-Headed Capitals

Even before systematic excavation, carved architectural fragments (debris from earthquakes) were scattered around the precinct.

Among the most spectacular finds discovered through excavation are two largely intact elephant-headed capitals, with four heads in place of an Ionic capital's volutes. These were found near the Lower Temenos in 2000, with 328 fragmented elephant-head elements found in total. In addition to the capitals, excavators found eight limestone relief panels depicting male and female busts, speculatively identified as in reference to Apollo/Ares, Aphrodite/Amazon, Tyche/Fortuna, and others.

Other finds included lamps, coins, Roman glass, ceramic figurines and vessels, with multiple Corinthian acanthus capitals and floral friezes. These artifacts point towards the construction of the "Great Temple" as beginning in the mid-late first century BCE.

Nabataean painted ceramics, painted and inscribed plaster, and a bronze plaque have been recovered in the Upper Temenos. To the southeast of the Upper Temenos, a cultic or votive figure carved in bas relief was found, rendered as holding a sword or dagger and hidden by an ashlar perimeter wall. This figure suggests that the so-called "Great Temple" may have been used as a place of worship.

== Interpretations ==
At the center of discussion about the "Great Temple" is whether Bachmann's postulation about the structure's function as a temple is correct. Joukowsky argues that due to the presence of a "theater" as opposed to a canonical cella (the main chamber of a canonical Greek or Roman temple), the building cannot have been repurposed to serve as a religious space.

Joukowsky makes the argument that the temple proper is comparable to what Arthur Segal describes as "ritual theaters", whose defining characteristic is a view of a notable natural or man-made feature. As excavation has proven that the cavea (seating area) predates the stage and had existed for a time without it—allowing for spectators to look out at the Wadi Musa—Segal's definition may be applicable to the "Great Temple".

As also happens with other religious buildings in Petra, it is unclear what deity, if any, the Nabataeans would have worshipped at the "Great Temple". Votive figures like the sword-carrying one found in its southernmost passageway are common elsewhere in Petra, and may have been left by stonemasons asking deities to bless their work, or communicating their remorse at altering natural rock formations. Aniconic baetyls make it conceivable that the Nabataeans’ principal deity Dushara or his partner Al-'Uzzá could have been venerated in this structure.

Some scholars foreground civic functions, examining the "Great Temple" with reference to standard Greco-Roman spaces such as the bouleuteria (council chambers) and comitium/curia (Roman political meeting place). The interpretation of the "Great Temple" as an administrative center is arguably supported by several references to a boule or council in the extant papyri from the late 1st to early 2nd century CE Babatha archive. Babatha was a Jewish woman whose letters have illuminated much about Nabataea and Roman Provincia Arabia, with most of the letters pertaining to transactions and legal ownership of property. Another find that upholds the option is a Roman Imperial inscription in Latin. Likewise dated to the second century, it acknowledges the emperor of the time by name and titulature, and was found in a western chamber of the temple.
