= Peter van Dommelen =

Dutch archaeologist (born 1966)

Peter Alexander René van Dommelen
- Title: Joukowsky Family Professor of Archaeology

Academic background
- Education: Leiden University
- Thesis: On colonial grounds: A comparative study of colonialism and rural settlement in first millennium BC west central Sardinia (1998)

Academic work
- Discipline: Archaeology and classics
- Sub-discipline: Archaeology of the Western Mediterranean; Phoenician-Punic archaeology
- Institutions: University of Glasgow; Brown University

Peter Alexander René van Dommelen (born 1966, Terneuzen) is a Dutch archaeologist and academic, who specialises in the archaeology of the Western Mediterranean and Phoenician-Punic archaeology. From July 2015 through June 2023, he was Director of the Joukowsky Institute for Archaeology and the Ancient World at Brown University.

== Early life and education ==
Van Dommelen was born in the Netherlands and took part in his first excavation while in high school. He studied classics and archaeology at Leiden University in the Netherlands. He graduated with two Master of Arts (MA) degrees in 1990, and completed a Doctor of Philosophy (PhD) degree in 1998. His doctoral thesis was titled "On colonial grounds. A comparative study of colonialism and rural settlement in first millennium BC west central Sardinia".

== Academic career ==
From 1993 to 1997, during his doctoral studies, van Dommelen was a graduate research assistant in the Department of Archaeology at Leiden University. In 1997, he moved to the University of Glasgow, Scotland, where he had been appointed a lecturer in archaeology. He was promoted to senior lecturer in 2005 and appointed Professor of Mediterranean Archaeology in 2008.

In 2012, van Dommelen moved to Brown University in the United States where he had been appointed Joukowsky Family Professor of Archaeology and Professor of Anthropology. In July 2015, he was appointed Director of the Joukowsky Institute for Archaeology and the Ancient World at Brown, stepping down from that role in 2023.

Van Dommelen was founding co-editor of Archaeological Dialogues from 1994 to 2005 and its managing editor from 2003 to 2005. Since 2006, he has been co-editor of the Journal of Mediterranean Archaeology. Since 2007, he has been co-editor of World Archaeology, a peer-reviewed academic journal covering all aspects of archaeology.

== Selected works ==
- Van Dommelen, Peter (1998). On colonial grounds: a comparative study of colonialism and rural settlement in first millennium BC west central Sardinia. Leiden: University of Leiden. ISBN 978-9076368023.
- Van Dommelen, Peter; Gómez Bellard, Carlos (2008). Rural landscapes of the Punic world. London: Equinox. ISBN 978-1845532703.
- Rowlands, Michael; Van Dommelen, Peter (2013). Material culture and postcolonial theory. Routledge. ISBN 978-0415247283.
- Van Dommelen, Peter; Knapp, A. Bernard, eds. (2010). Material connections in the ancient Mediterranean: mobility, materiality, and Mediterranean identities. Abingdon, Oxon: Routledge. ISBN 978-0415586689.
- Knapp, A. Bernard; van Dommelen, Peter, eds. (2015). The Cambridge prehistory of the Bronze and Iron Age Mediterranean. Cambridge University Press. ISBN 978-0521766883.
