= Susan E. Alcock =

American classical archaeologist

- Awards: Distinguished Lecture in Archaeology

Academic background
- Education: Yale University; University of Cambridge
- Thesis: Greek society and the transition to Roman rule

Academic work
- Discipline: Archaeology
- Institutions: University of Michigan; Brown University; University of Michigan-Flint

Susan Ellen Alcock is an American archaeologist specializing in survey archaeology and the archaeology of memory in the provinces of the Roman Empire. Alcock grew up in Massachusetts and was educated at Yale and the University of Cambridge. She is now the inaugural holder of the Barnett Family Professorship of Classical Archaeology at the University of Oklahoma, where she teaches courses in the Department of Classics & Letters.

== Early life and education ==
From 1979 to 1983, Alcock studied at Yale University, graduating summa cum laude with a Bachelor of Arts degree in Archaeology and History. She then studied classics at Clare College, Cambridge, graduating from the University of Cambridge with a starred first class BA in 1985; as per tradition, this BA was promoted to a Master of Arts (MA Cantab) degree in 1989. She remained at Cambridge to undertake postgraduate research, and completed her PhD in 1989 with a doctoral thesis titled "Greek society and the transition to Roman rule".

== Career ==
Alcock served as the Director of the Joukowsky Institute for Archaeology and the Ancient World and Professor of Classics at Brown University from January 2006 until 2015. Before that, she was the John H. D'Arms Professor of Classical Archaeology at the University of Michigan. She was co-director of the Pylos Regional Archaeological Project in southwestern Greece, then co-director of the Vorotan Project in southern Armenia, and is now director of the Brown University Petra Archaeological Project. In 2000 she was awarded a MacArthur Fellowship.

In 2015, Alcock was appointed Special Counsel for Institutional Outreach and Engagement and Arthur F. Thurnau Professor of Classical Archaeology and Classics at the University of Michigan, and became the Interim Provost and Vice Chancellor for Academic Affairs at the University of Michigan-Flint in July 2018. In 2022, she left to join the teaching faculty as Professor of Classical Archaeology at the University of Oklahoma-Norman.

== Publications ==
- Graecia Capta: The Landscapes of Roman Greece (Cambridge 1993) ISBN 9780521568197
- (editor with Robin Osborne) Placing the Gods: Sanctuaries and Sacred Space in Ancient Greece (Oxford 1994) ISBN 9780198149477
- (editor) The Early Roman Empire in the East (Oxford 1997, Oxbow 2010) ISBN 9781900188524
- Archaeologies of the Greek Past: Landscape, Monuments and Memory (Cambridge 2001/2002) ISBN 9780521890007
- (edited with John Cherry and Jas Elsner) Pausanias: Travel and Memory in Roman Greece (New York 2001)
- (editor with Terence D'Altroy, Kathleen Morrison and Carla Sinopoli) Empires: Perspectives from History and Archaeology (Cambridge 2001) ISBN 9780521112345
- (editor with Ruth Van Dyke) The Archaeology of Memory (Oxford 2003)
- (editor with John Cherry) Side-by-Side Survey: Comparative Regional Analysis in the Mediterranean Region (Oxford 2004, Oxbow 2016) ISBN 9781785701580
- (editor with Lauren Talalay) In the Field: The Archaeological Expeditions of the Kelsey Museum of Archaeology (Ann Arbor 2006)
