= Katharine Kniskern Mather =

American geologist with US Army

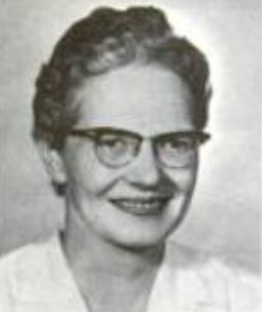
- Katharine Selden Kniskern, from a 1963 publication of the United States federal government
- Born: Katharine Selden Kniskern; 1916; Ithaca, New York
- Died: 1991 (aged 74–75); Jackson, Mississippi
- Occupation: geologist
- Years active: 1942 to 1982
- Known for: career with the U. S. Army Corps of Engineers
- Awards: Federal Woman's Award (1963)

Katharine Selden Kniskern Mather (October 21, 1916 – February 4, 1991) was an American geologist with the United States Army Corps of Engineers, conducting research on cement and concrete.

== Early life ==
Katharine Selden Kniskern was born October 21, 1916, in Ithaca, New York, the daughter of Walter Hamlin Kniskern and Katharine Emily Selden Kniskern. Her parents both graduated from Cornell University. Her father was a chemical engineer. She attended St. Catherine's School in Richmond, Virginia, and earned a degree in geology at Bryn Mawr College in 1937. She pursued further geological studies as a graduate student at Johns Hopkins University from 1937 to 1940.

== Career ==
Mather was a research associate at the Field Museum of Natural History in Chicago, from 1940 to 1941. From 1942 to 1982, she was a geologist with the U. S. Army Corps of Engineers, based in Vicksburg, Mississippi at the Waterways Experiment Station (WES). She was chief of the petrography and x-ray branch in the Concrete Laboratory from 1947 to 1976, and chief of the Engineering and Science Division from 1976 to 1980.

She served on the board of directors of the American Concrete Institute from 1968 to 1971, and as president of the Clay Minerals Society in 1973.

She was editor of The Journal of the Mississippi Academy of Sciences in the 1960s. Her research usually focused on cement and concrete, with technical publications such as "Applications of Light Microscopy in Concrete Research" (1953), "Examination of Cores from Four Highway Bridges in Georgia" (1973), "Concrete Weathering at Treat Island, Maine" (1980), and "Condition of Concrete in Martin Dam after 50 Years of Service" (1981).

She and her husband were avid butterfly collectors, and co-wrote Butterflies of Mississippi (1958).

== Awards ==
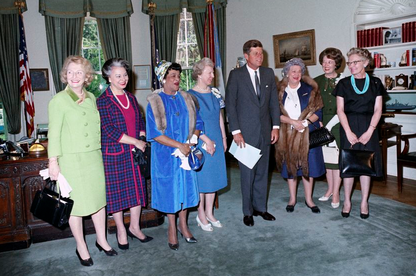
President John F. Kennedy with 1963 Federal Woman's Award winners. From left to right: Katie Louchheim, Bessie Margolin, Eleanor L. Makel, Verna C. Mohagen, President Kennedy, Blanche W. Noyes, Eleanor C. Pressly, Katharine Mather. Photograph by Cecil W. Stoughton.

Mather received several awards and honors for her work, including these:

- C-9 Sanford E. Thompson Award, American Society for Testing and Materials (1953)
- Wasson Medal for Research, American Concrete Institute (1955, with Tom Kennedy)
- Department of the Army Decoration for Exceptional Civilian Service (1962)
- Federal Woman's Award (1963)
- Department of Defense Decoration for Distinguished Civilian Service (1964)
- Woman of the Year Award, Jackson Business and Professional Women's Club (1968)
- Waterways Experiment Station Woman of the Year (1974)
- Honorary Doctor of Science, Clarkson University (1978)
- Arthur R. Anderson Award, American Concrete Institute (1982)
- WES Gallery of Distinguished Former Employees (1984)

President Lyndon B. Johnson named Mather to the President's Study Group on Careers for Women in 1964. In 1986, the Mississippi Academy of Sciences recognized her contributions in 1980 and 1986. She was elected a fellow of the Mineralogical Society of America.

== Personal life ==
Katharine Kniskern married fellow geologist Bryant Mather (1916-2002) in 1940. She died on February 4, 1991, aged 75 years, in Jackson, Mississippi. Her papers are held in the Archives of Women in Science and Engineering, Special Collections Department, Iowa State University. The American Concrete Institute named the Katharine and Bryant Mather Fellowship in honor of the Mathers.
