= Eleanor C. Pressly =

American mathematician and aeronautical engineer

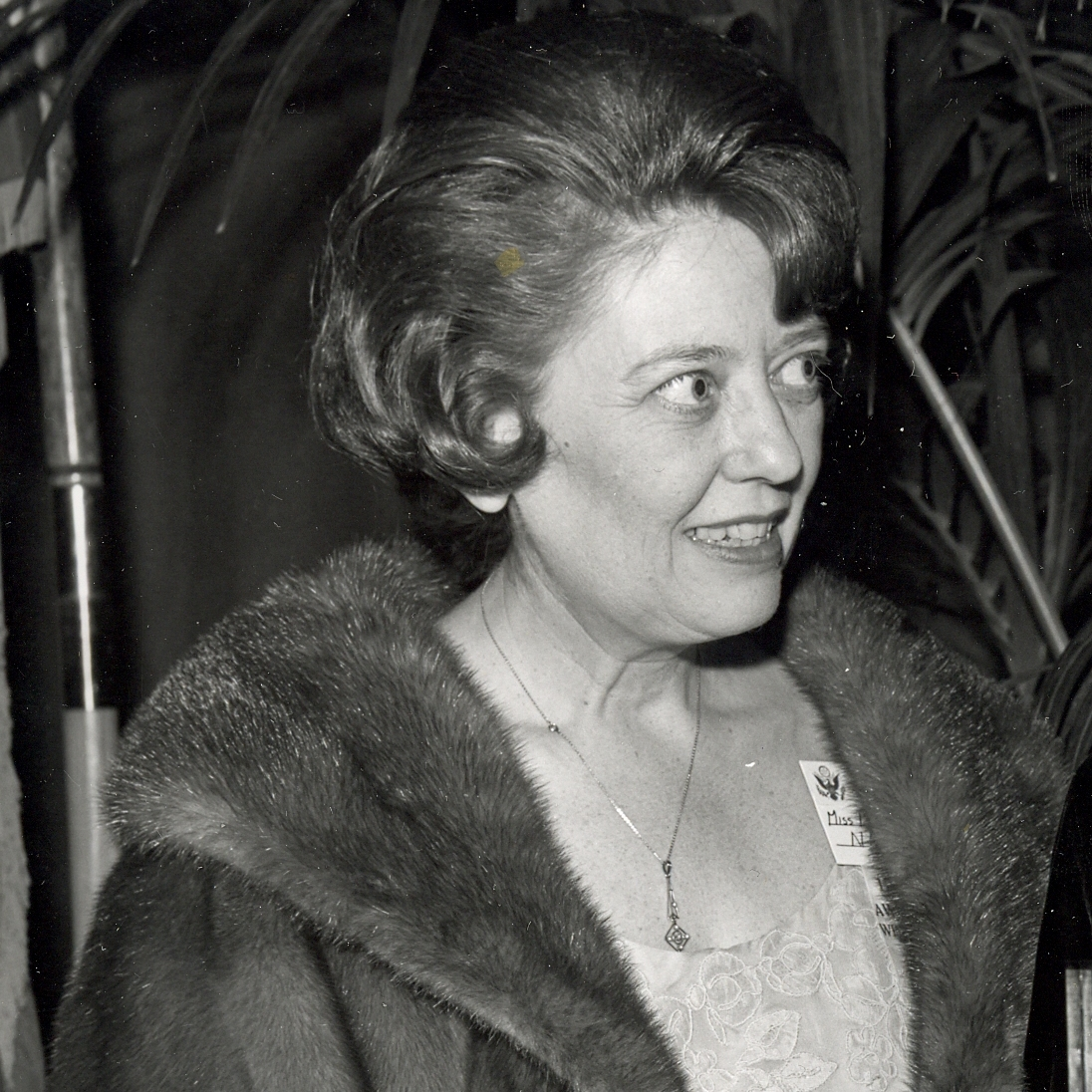
- Portrait in 1964
- Born: 1918; Due West, South Carolina, U.S.
- Died: May 10, 2003 (aged 84); Rockville, Maryland, U.S.
- Education: Erskine College (BS); Duke University (MS)
- Occupations: Mathematician; aeronautical engineer
- Known for: Aerobee; Sounding rockets Goddard Space Flight Center

Eleanor Crockett Pressly (1918 – May 10, 2003) was an American mathematician and aeronautical engineer in the sounding rocket program at NASA's Goddard Space Flight Center. She worked on the Aerobee rocket with James Van Allen and John W. Townsend Jr. in the late 1950s.

== Early life ==
Pressly was born in Due West, South Carolina in 1918, the only child of Samuel Agnew Pressly and Georgia Crockett Pressly. She earned a bachelor's degree at Erskine College in 1938, and a master's degree in mathematics at Duke University in 1943.

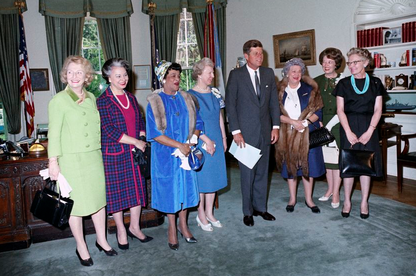
President John F. Kennedy with 1963 Federal Woman's Award winners. From left to right: Katie Louchheim, Bessie Margolin, Eleanor L. Makel, Verna C. Mohagen, President Kennedy, Blanche W. Noyes, Eleanor C. Pressly, Katharine Mather. Photograph by Cecil W. Stoughton.

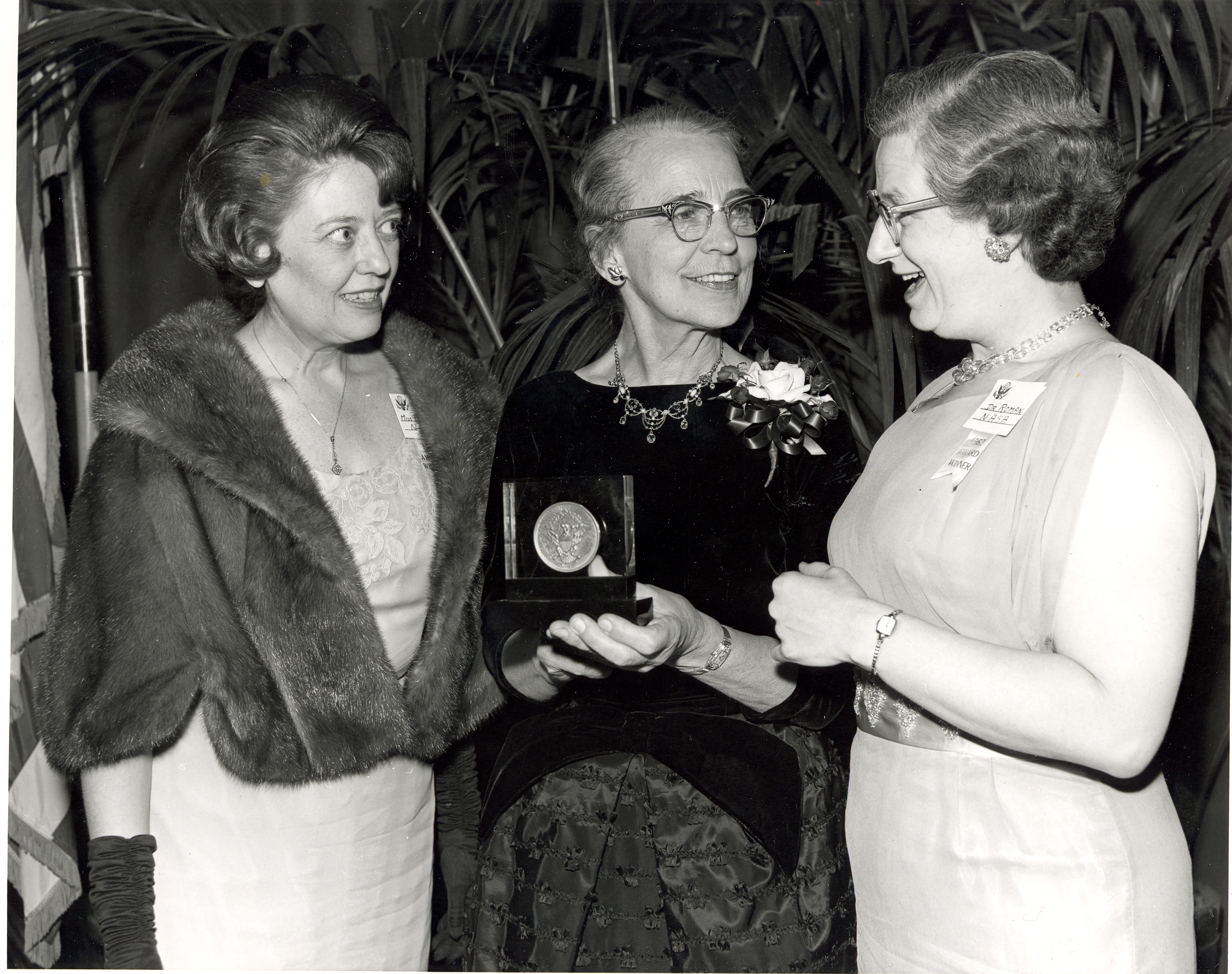
Eleanor Pressly, Evelyn M. Anderson, and Nancy Roman, from a 1964 awards ceremony

== Career ==
During World War II, Pressly taught mathematics to air corps students at Winthrop College and worked at Radio Research Laboratory at Harvard University. After the war, she was a mathematician and aeronautical research engineer at the United States Naval Research Laboratory and was a member of the American Rocket Society. She also oversaw launches at White Sands Missile Range and Fort Churchill in Manitoba. "No matter how many times it happens, I can never get over the excitement of a launching," she told an interviewer in 1957.

Pressly transferred to the Goddard Space Flight Center soon after it opened in 1958, and was head of the Vehicles Section in the Spacecraft Integration and Sounding Rocket Division, in charge of probes launched into the upper atmosphere. She developed the Aerobee Jr., co-developed Aerobee-Hi 150, and oversaw the design of the Aerobee Hi 150 A, all sounding rockets used during the International Geophysical Year (1957–1958). When James E. Webb spoke to the General Federation of Women's Clubs in 1962, he mentioned Pressly by name as one of the women in a "position of importance" at NASA.

In 1963 Pressly was one of the six recipients of the Federal Woman's Award, given to career federal employees who made significant contributions to their programs. In 1964, Lady Bird Johnson invited Pressly to the White House again, for a luncheon about women in the space program. In 1966, she chaired a panel at the Conference on Unguided Rocket Ballistics in El Paso, Texas. In 1981 she was honored with the Mary Mildred Sullivan Award from the Erskine Alumni Association.

== Publications ==
Publications by Pressly included "Counting with Geiger Counters" (Review of Scientific Instruments 1949, with Homer E. Newell), Upper Atmosphere Research Report Number 21. Summary of Upper Atmosphere Rocket Research Firings (Naval Research Laboratory, February 1954, with Charles P. Smith Jr.), "A Mass Spectrometric Study of the Upper Atmosphere" (1954, with John W. Townsend Jr. and Edith B. Meadows), "Future Sounding Rockets" (1958, with Newell and Townsend) "The Aerobee Rocket" (1958, with Townsend and James Van Allen), and "The Sounding Rocket as a Tool for College and University Research" (NASA, December 1962).

== Personal life ==
Pressly died in Rockville, Maryland, in 2003, aged 84 years. Her only noted survivor was a cousin.
