= Bessie Margolin =

American lawyer

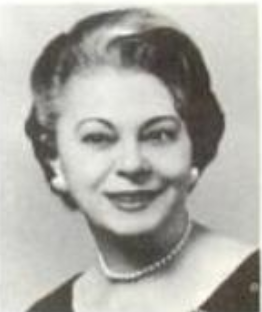
- Margolin in 1963
- Born: 1909; New York City, New York, U.S.
- Died: June 19, 1996 (aged 86–87); Arlington, Virginia, U.S.
- Education: Tulane University (BA, LLB); Yale University (LLM, SJD)
- Awards: Federal Woman's Award (1963)

Bessie Margolin (1909 – June 19, 1996) was an American lawyer and activist. She was a U.S. Department of Labor attorney from 1939 until 1972, arguing numerous cases before the Supreme Court. Margolin undertook a large amount of litigation related to the Fair Labor Standards Act, creating a vast body of law in the area of employment standards in the process.

== Early life ==
Margolin's parents, who escaped persecution against Jews in Russia, immigrated to New York City shortly before her birth. Her mother died while Margolin was still young, and she spent the rest of her childhood at the Jewish Children's Home in New Orleans. She graduated from Isidore Newman School in 1925. In 1929, Margolin received her bachelor's degree from Tulane University's Newcomb College. She went on to earn her law degree at Tulane and then undertook further legal studies at Yale University. She received her doctorate in law from Yale in 1933.

Following her graduation from Yale, Margolin joined the Tennessee Valley Authority as an attorney. As Margolin later stated, "Government attracts the competent women [attorneys] because they have no alternative," referencing the fact that, at the time, most prestigious law firms would not hire women.

Her career at the TVA was somewhat clouded by allegations that she had an affair with Larry Fly, then general counsel of the agency. In early 1943, after Margolin had left the TVA and following a Federal Communications Commission investigation into Congressman Eugene Cox (D-GA) for accepting a bribe from radio station WALB, the United States House of Representatives created a special investigative committee, chaired by Cox, to look into the FCC. This committee used the affair allegations to convince Fly, by then chairman of the FCC, to cooperate with the committee.

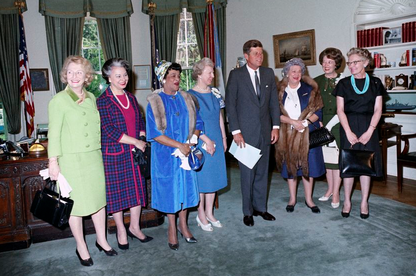
President John F. Kennedy with 1963 Federal Woman's Award winners. From left to right: Katie Louchheim, Bessie Margolin, Eleanor L. Makel, Verna C. Mohagen, President Kennedy, Blanche W. Noyes, Eleanor C. Pressly, Katharine Mather. Photograph by Cecil W. Stoughton.

== Department of Labor career ==
In 1939, Margolin joined the Department of Labor. She became an expert on the Fair Labor Standards Act and was eventually promoted to Assistant Solicitor in charge of Supreme Court appellate litigation. In this role, and in her later role as Associate Solicitor, Margolin argued 27 cases before the Supreme Court. Of these 27 cases, the Department of Labor position prevailed in 25 of them, an impressive 93% success rate. As Associate Solicitor, Margolin supervised 33 other attorneys, making her one of the senior female attorneys in the entire federal government.

Of the many cases Margolin argued before the Supreme Court, particular importance is attached to the following examples. In McComb v. Jacksonville Paper Co., 336 U.S. 187 (1949)., Margolin's arguments resulted in a decision that the department need not show that violations of a court decree to comply with provisions of the Fair Labor Standards Act were willful in order for a court to find the respondent in contempt. This particular decision brought to an end litigation between the company and the department that had lasted more than five years, and it confirmed that contempt of court could be used by the department to enforce the requirements of the Fair Labor Standards Act. The case of Mitchell v. Lublin, McGaughy & Asso., 358 U.S. 207 (1959)., argued by Margolin, provided a clear definition of "engaged in commerce" and thus made clear what types of employees were covered under the Fair Labor Standards Act. The decision clarified that the department's enforcement authority included those who work on plans, drawings and specifications.

The respect that the Supreme Court justices had for Margolin is shown in Maneja v. Waialua Agricultural Co., 349 U.S. 254, 255 (1955)., which indicates that the court specifically invited her to argue before the court as amicus curiae.

Following World War II, Margolin was temporarily assigned to the War Department at the Nuremberg trials. In this role, she drafted the original regulation under which the tribunals were constituted.

In 1963, Hale Boggs recommended to President Lyndon Johnson that Margolin be appointed to the United States Court of Claims. As then Secretary of Labor Willard Wirtz told President Johnson, Margolin was a "top notch" attorney and referenced her excellent record arguing before the Supreme Court. In the end, however, President Johnson appointed Wilson Cowen to the post.

Margolin retired from the Department of Labor in 1972. Several Supreme Court justices, including Chief Justice Earl Warren, came to her retirement dinner. At the dinner, Warren said that Margolin's work had made federal wage and hour law "meaningful and responsible."

== Other ==
In 1966 Margolin became a co-founder of the National Organization for Women.

== Later life ==
Following her retirement, Margolin served as an arbitrator and occasionally taught at the George Washington University Law Center. Following a stroke, she died at Arlington Hospital, Virginia.
