= Boni & Liveright =

American trade book publisher

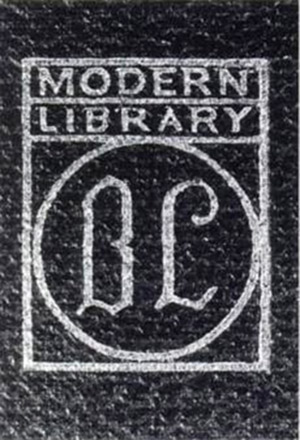
- First colophon used between 1917 and 1924
- Status: Revived in 2012
- Founded: 1917
- Founders: Albert Boni; Horace Liveright
- Successor: W. W. Norton & Company
- Country of origin: United States
- Headquarters location: New York City
- Publication types: Books

Boni & Liveright (pronounced "BONE-eye" and "LIV-right") is an American trade book publisher established in 1917 in New York City by Albert Boni and Horace Liveright. Over the next sixteen years the firm, which changed its name to Horace Liveright, Inc., in 1928 and then Liveright, Inc., in 1931, published more than a thousand books. Before its bankruptcy in 1933 and subsequent reorganization as Liveright Publishing Corporation, Inc., it had achieved considerable notoriety for editorial acumen, brash marketing, and challenge to contemporary obscenity and censorship laws. Their logo is of a cowled monk.

It was the first American publisher of William Faulkner, Ernest Hemingway, Sigmund Freud, E. E. Cummings, Jean Toomer, Hart Crane, Lewis Mumford, Anita Loos, and the Modern Library series. In addition to being the house of Theodore Dreiser and Sherwood Anderson throughout the 1920s, it notably published T. S. Eliot's The Waste Land, Isadora Duncan's My Life, Nathanael West's Miss Lonelyhearts, Djuna Barnes's Ryder, Ezra Pound's Personae, John Reed's Ten Days That Shook the World, and Eugene O'Neill's plays. In his biography of Horace Liveright, Firebrand, author Tom Dardis noted B&L was "the most magnificent yet messy publishing firm this century has seen." In 1974, Liveright's remaining backlist was bought by W. W. Norton & Company. Norton revived the name as an imprint in 2012 as Liveright Publishing Corporation.

== Early history ==
=== Beginnings; The Modern Library ===
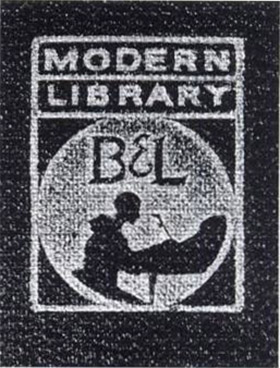
Second colophon used between 1924 and 1925

With outside investment that principally came from Horace Liveright's father-in-law, paper executive Herman Elsas, Boni & Liveright incorporated on February 16, 1917. Though Liveright had no publishing experience (he had been a bond and paper salesman), Albert Boni recently had run a Greenwich Village bookshop with his brother, Charles. Boni's association with Village bohemia and his earlier success publishing a line of inexpensive, pocket-sized classics called the Little Leather Library served as inspiration for B&L's debut list called The Modern Library of the World's Best Books. A mix of well-known and hard-to-find literature priced at 60 cents apiece and bound in lambskin, the Modern Library in 1917, according to biographer Walker Gilmer, "reflected the avant-garde influence of [Albert Boni's] Washington Square book-borrowing friends: Wilde, The Picture of Dorian Gray; Strindberg, Married; Kipling, Soldiers Three; Stevenson, Treasure Island; Wells, The War in the Air; Ibsen, A Doll's House, An Enemy of the People, and Ghosts; France, The Red Lily; de Maupassant, Mademoiselle Fifi, and Other Stories; Nietzsche, Thus Spoke Zarathustra; Dostoyevsky, Poor Folk; Maeterlinck, A Miracle of Saint Anthony; and Schopenhauer, Studies in Pessimism."

Boni & Liveright, like other new publishers of the era such as Alfred A. Knopf, sold to customers predominantly in the Northeast and California.

The success was immediate and demand for more titles forced Boni & Liveright to expand the initial list to 36 before the year ended. It would quickly become the cornerstone for the young company and allow the firm to take on riskier books and high-profile authors. The sale of the Modern Library to Bennett Cerf has been noted by biographer Tom Dardis as a critical tactical error and major loss of revenue that likely crippled the firm in their final years of operation.

=== Horace Liveright and modernism ===
Third colophon used between 1925 and 1929. Designed by Lucina Bernhard.

Only a year and a half after co-founding Boni & Liveright, Albert Boni departed the company due to differences with Horace Liveright. Boni claimed that he won a coin toss over the opportunity to buy out the other's share, but then his backing investor dropped out, leaving him no alternative than to sell to Liveright. Though not as politically extreme as Albert Boni, Horace Liveright enjoyed the mantle of radical publisher as he quickly established an openness to new literary trends and avant-garde ideas.

In 1917, Alfred Knopf, then another newly established New York publishing house, published Ezra Pound's Lustra to poor reviews and sales. The following year Boni & Liveright agreed to publish a collection of prose by Pound, Instigations, which included an essay by Ernest Fenellosa. Boni & Liveright bought Pound's next volume of poetry, Poems: 1918–1921; the publisher's inclusion of the date in the title was considered daring and innovative.

In addition to publishing Ezra Pound's poetry, Liveright engaged Pound as a translator and scout in Europe. Pound would encourage his friends T. S. Eliot and James Joyce to publish their latest works with Horace Liveright, who Pound praised "as a pearl among publishers." While The Waste Land would appear on their list in 1922, Boni & Liveright would ultimately give up their pursuit of Ulysses, due to the overwhelming legal challenges surrounding the controversial work. It would finally be published in America by Bennett Cerf, a former vice president of Boni & Liveright, at Random House in 1934. Liveright published Pound's Personae in 1925, retaining rights to the work well into the 1940s after the company collapsed and merged with Random House.

Despite being commercially risky for the times, Boni & Liveright would introduce many now influential experimental writers to the American reading public, including Cummings, Crane, H.D., Hemingway, and Toomer. The two Faulkner novels (Soldiers' Pay and Mosquitoes) are considered among the lesser works of the Nobel Prize-winner but still contain modernist devices (such as stream of consciousness) that reflect the direction he took in later fiction.

The one exception to this risk-taking investment was Eugene O'Neill. While most of Liveright's avant-garde publications failed to earn out their advances during the 1920s (Hart Crane would die $210 in debt to the house), O'Neill's plays were frequently amongst the firm's top-selling books. After winning the Pulitzer Prize for Beyond the Horizon in 1920, the Greenwich Village playwright reached national attention. The B&L edition of Strange Interlude would sell more than 100,000 copies, becoming the bestselling play of the decade. In all, Liveright would publish thirteen of O'Neill's dramas, but would have to relinquish those rights in 1933 during bankruptcy proceedings.

=== Society for the Suppression of Vice ===
If publishing the literary new guard brought more acclaim than cash flow to the press, sex, or the suggestion of it, created commercial opportunity for Boni & Liveright. Many of its bestselling books were considered scandalous or titillating for the period, inviting the scrutiny of figures like John Sumner and the New York Society for the Suppression of Vice. Throughout the 1920s – decades before Barney Rosset's landmark legal battles at Grove Press – Horace Liveright frequently fought off censors and obscenity legislation. The publicity surrounding these battles only stoked the curiosity of readers further and forced the publisher to reprint otherwise unexceptionally sensational works.

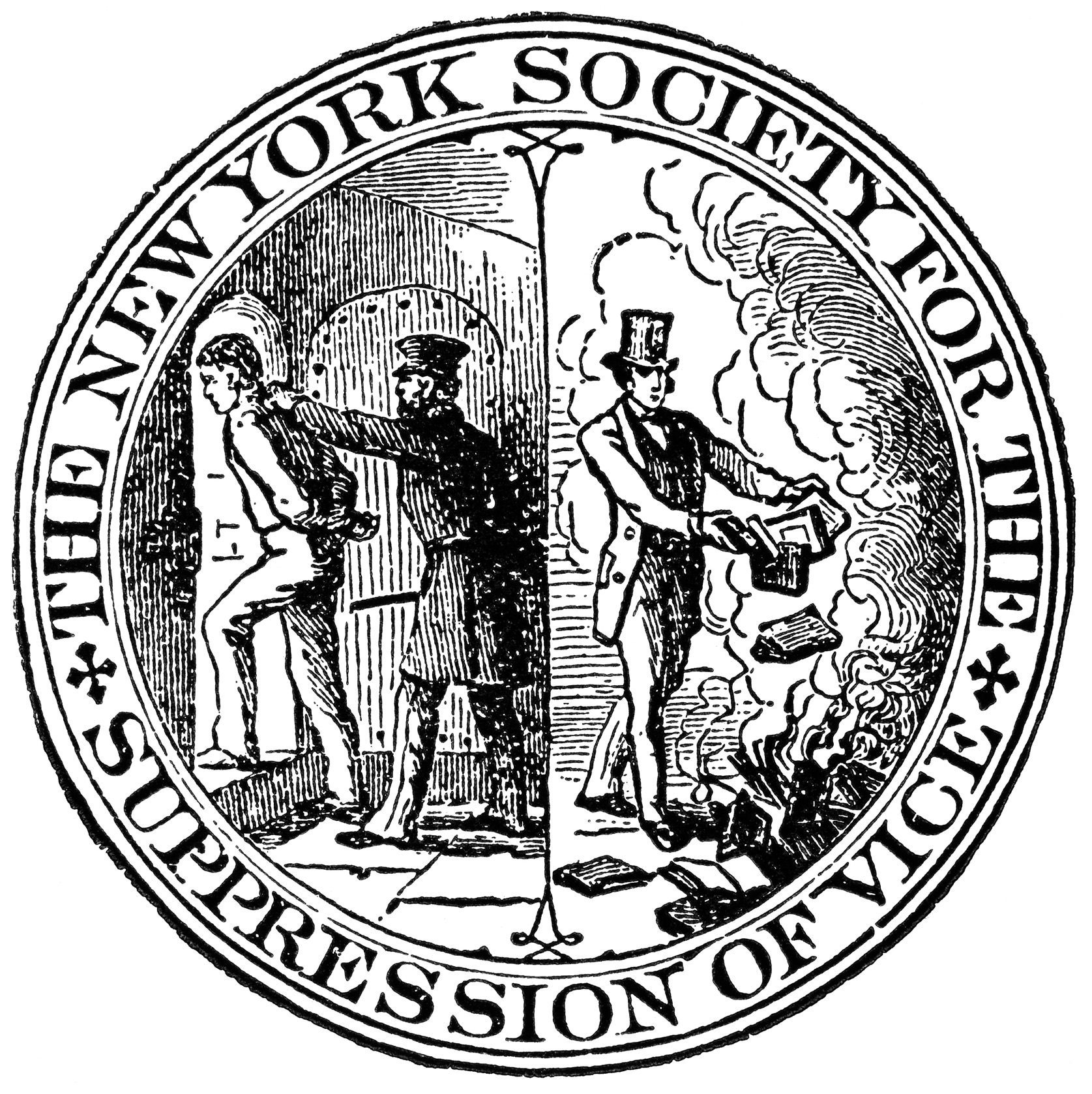
In the 1920s much of the modernist material published by Boni & Liveright was challenged by the New York Society for the Suppression of Vice.

The publisher mostly got around these challenges by issuing limited editions available only by subscription (as in the case of George Moore and Waldo Frank's novels). Yet B&L could not escape the scorn of John Sumner who, as successor to Anthony Comstock at the New York Society for the Suppression of Vice, regularly threatened suit against publishers of risqué or prurient material. The New York Society, alongside Boston's Watch and Ward Society (giving rise to the term "Banned in Boston"), informally enforced prevailing state laws prohibiting the distribution of inappropriate literature. What defined inappropriate would lead to some of the most notable fights between Liveright and Sumner.

The first was over a modern translation of Petronius's Satyricon, a nearly 2,000-year-old classic that Sumner deemed offensive for a passage referring to orgies and homosexuality. The case against Boni & Liveright would drag out for several months in the courts and in the press (where Liveright passionately spoke out against censorship) but be ultimately dismissed by a grand jury in October 1922. Undeterred, Sumner returned by working with state assemblymen to propose a Clean Books Bill in the Albany legislature.

Introduced in 1923, the bill broadly defined objectionable literature so any portion of obscene, lewd, or indecent text could serve as sufficient evidence to have a whole work banned. Liveright was nearly alone amongst New York publishers to publicly oppose the legislation, writing prominent editorials in defense of free speech and leading a contingent of authors, journalists, and lawyers to fight the bill in Albany in April 1923. His lobbying efforts were bolstered by the support of James "Jimmy" Walker, future mayor of New York but then a minority leader of the State Senate, who coached Liveright on how to lobby the legislators. On May 3, 1923, after a rousing speech by Walker belittling the bill, in which he joked "No woman was ever ruined by a book", the Clean Books Bill was defeated.

Though the New York Society for the Suppression of Vice and the Watch and Ward Society would threaten the publisher several more times in the late 1920s – notably for the novels Replenishing Jessica by Maxwell Bodenheim and An American Tragedy by Theodore Dreiser – Liveright and his lawyers (including Arthur Garfield Hays and Clarence Darrow) often won in the court of public opinion. Only when on the verge of bankruptcy in 1930 did Liveright capitulate to Sumner and destroy the plates of "an allegedly obscene work called Josephine, the Great Lover".

=== Notable staff ===
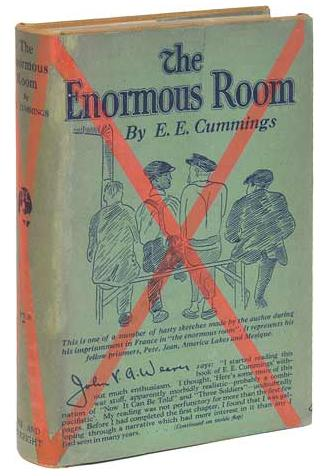
E. E. Cummings's The Enormous Room was published by Boni & Liveright in 1922.

Throughout the teens, 1920s and early 1930s, many notable writers, editors, and future publishers worked for Boni & Liveright. The core of his staff included T.R. Smith in editorial, Manuel Komroff in production, Julian Messner in sales, and Arthur Pell (who would ultimately succeed Liveright as president) in accounting.

T.R. "Tommy" Smith was hired in 1919 to replace Thomas Seltzer, Albert Boni's uncle, as editor-in-chief. Well-connected and exceptionally bright, Smith, next to Horace Liveright, became B&L's most important editorial guiding force. An "authority on the erotic and the pornographic and, happily, one who knew the difference between them, [he] seemed to be able to smell out best-sellers and masterpieces alike." He would stay with the firm through its bankruptcy in 1933.

In 1919, Liveright also hired Edward Bernays to consult on publicity. Bernays, who was Sigmund Freud's nephew and a pioneer of modern public relations, helped define propaganda as an effective marketing tool. According to Bernays's memoirs Liveright singled out five titles for him to initially promote: "they covered sex, prohibition, psychoanalysis, radicalism, women's place in society." He would publish two of his influential books on public relations with Boni & Liveright as well as broker Freud's association with the publishing house.

Richard Simon, who co-founded Simon & Schuster in 1924, worked in sales for B&L during the early 1920s. Bennett Cerf was vice president between 1923 and 1925, before buying the Modern Library list and later starting, with Donald Klopfer, Random House. Donald Friede, another vice president, co-founded Covici-Friede publishers.

Lillian Hellman and the critic Louis Kronenberger were readers for Boni & Liveright. And several staff members, including Isidor Schneider, Kronenberger, Komroff, Edith M. Stern, and Leane Zugsmith published books of their own with B&L.

=== Legacy ===
Because of its outside status, Boni & Liveright, along with the two other firms founded and run by Jewish-Americans in the late teens – Knopf and Huebsch – took considerably more risks than the established and traditional publishers of the day. Edward Bernays in his memoirs noted that until then other firms "were run like conservative banking houses." Bennett Cerf observed: "There had never been a Jew in American publishing, which was a closed corporation to the rising tide of young people described in Our Crowd. Suddenly there had burst forth on the scene some bright young Jews who were upsetting all the old tenets of the publishing business – and the flashiest of all was certainly Liveright."

B&L's challenges to obscenity laws, innovative marketing, and its willingness to publish difficult, politically charged, or unconventional authors helped transform, according to Tom Dardis, "the staid, self-satisfied atmosphere of American publishing into an exciting, pulsing forum in which contemporary American writing could come of age."

== Later history ==
=== Surviving bankruptcy ===
Fourth colophon used between 1929 and 1933. Designed by Rockwell Kent.

Though Boni & Liveright's titles were consistently on bestseller lists during the 1920s, the firm survived on the barest of margins. Lavish ad campaigns, expensive offices (where Liveright famously entertained his friends and authors at 61 West 48th Street), generous advances, and the loss of revenue from the Modern Library backlist stretched finances, but it would be Horace Liveright's poor investment decisions outside book publishing that ultimately jeopardized the company's solvency.

Described by colleagues as a gambler, Liveright frequently lost money on the stock market, particularly following the advice of his friend and banker Otto Kahn. He also branched out in theatrical production and despite some successes (for example with the stage version of Dracula), most Liveright-backed plays and musicals were financial disasters. Following the collapse of the stock market in 1929, book sales slumped and Horace Liveright was forced to sell the bulk of his shares in Horace Liveright, Inc. (as the firm was recently renamed), resigning from the company in August 1930. He worked briefly for film studios before he died from pneumonia and emphysema on September 24, 1933, at the age of forty-nine. As its lists shrank in the early 1930s, so did the firm's revenues. Now under the helm of its longtime treasurer, Arthur Pell, Liveright Inc. fell into involuntary bankruptcy in May 1933, selling off many of their assets. However Pell did retain much of the backlist (including important works by Freud, Toomer, Loos, Cummings, and Crane) in a reorganization of the company called Liveright Publishing Corporation. That entity remained independent, publishing new books as well as repackaging backlist, until 1969 when it was sold to Harrison Blaine of New Jersey, Inc., a private holding company which also owned The New Republic. Between 1969 and 1974, a new staff attempted a revival, publishing about 50 original books and about 50 reissues from the backlist.

=== More recent developments ===
Liveright Publishing
- Stylized colophon as of 2019
- Status: Active
- Founded: Acquired by W. W. Norton & Company in 1974
- Country of origin: United States
- Headquarters location: New York City
- Publication types: Books
- No. of employees: 12
- Official website: wwnorton.com/liveright

In September 1974, W. W. Norton & Company bought the company where it has remained a wholly owned subsidiary.

In April 2012, Liveright Publishing inaugurated its first original list in four decades.

== Sources ==
- Dardis, Tom. (1995) Firebrand: The Life of Horace Liveright. Random House. ISBN 978-0679406754
- Egleston, Charles – editor. (2004) Dictionary of Literary Biography: The House of Boni & Liveright, 1917–1933: A Documentary Volume. USA: Gale. ISBN 0-7876-6825-7
- Gilmer, Walker. (1970) Horace Liveright Publisher of the Twenties. New York: David Lewis. ISBN 0-912012-02-1
- Sieburth, Richard. "Editor's Afterword". in Ezra Pound's New Selected Poems and Translation. (2010). New York: New Directions.
- Welky, David. (2008) Everything was Better in America: Print Culture in the Great Depression. University of Illinois.
