= Eleanor L. Makel =

American medical doctor and government official (1914–1992)

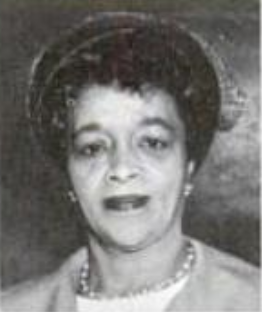
- Eleanor L. Makel, from a 1963 publication of the United States Civil Service Commission.
- Born: March 17, 1914; Philadelphia, Pennsylvania, U.S.
- Died: March 1, 1992 (aged 77); Washington, D.C., U.S.
- Occupations: medical doctor, hospital administrator, federal official
- Known for: 1963 Federal Woman's Award recipient

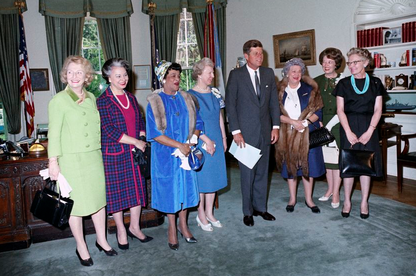
President John F. Kennedy with 1963 Federal Woman's Award winners. From left to right: Katie Louchheim, Bessie Margolin, Eleanor L. Makel, Verna C. Mohagen, President Kennedy, Blanche W. Noyes, Eleanor C. Pressly, Katharine Mather. Photograph by Cecil W. Stoughton.

Eleanor L. Makel (March 7, 1914 – March 1, 1992) was an American medical doctor, hospital administrator, and government official. During the administration of John F. Kennedy, Makel was one of the highest ranking black women in the federal government.

== Early life ==
Eleanor Lewis Makel was from Philadelphia, Pennsylvania, the daughter of Alexander E. Makel and Florence (Flora) Lewis Makel. Her parents ran a clothing store; her mother was active in the African Methodist Episcopal Church and in the Progressive Business Association. Eleanor Makel attended Howard University, graduating in 1938. In 1943 she graduated from Meharry Medical College.

== Career ==
Makel was the first woman doctor admitted to a residency in internal medicine at the Freedman's Hospital in Washington. She also worked at the District of Columbia Health Department, and in the student health program at Howard University, early in her career. She was a medical officer in the U. S. Department of Health, Education and Welfare, based at St. Elizabeths Hospital from 1953. She was the first black person to hold a professional staff position at the hospital.

In 1963 Makel was one of the six recipients of the Federal Woman's Award, presented to career federal employees who made significant contributions to their programs. Makel was one of the highest ranking African-American women in the federal government during the Kennedy administration. By 1971 she was Director of the Medical and Surgical Branch at St. Elizabeths. In 1980, she was among the hospital administrators accused of discriminatory promotion in the lawsuit Daye v. Harris. She gave an oral history interview about her career in medicine and government in 1983, for the Women in the Federal Government Oral History Project at Harvard University.

Makel also held a teaching position at the George Washington University School of Medicine.

== Personal life ==
Eleanor L. Makel married Gerald E. Roberts, a law librarian. She died in 1992, aged 77 years, in Washington, D.C.
