= Little Leather Library Corporation =

American publishing company

The Little Leather Library Corporation was an American publishing company founded in New York City by Charles and Albert Boni, Harry Scherman, and Max Sackheim. From 1916 to 1923(?) the Little Leather Library Corporation issued 101 literary classics in miniature editions and sold over 25 million little books through department stores, bookstores, drugstores, and by mail.

Sometime in the 1920s, Robert K. Haas acquired a controlling interest and he renamed the company Robert K. Haas, Inc., sometime before it stopped publishing new titles in 1925.

Scherman, Sackheim, and Haas created the Book of the Month Club in 1926.

== History ==
The Little Leather Library Corporation was conceived of by publisher brothers Charles and Albert Boni in about 1914. Inspired by the example of a cigarette company that gave away free miniature copies of works by William Shakespeare with each tobacco purchase, the brothers created a prototype — a miniature copy of Romeo and Juliet. In 1916 they showed their prototype to ad men Harry Scherman and Maxwell Sackheim, who worked at J. Walter Thompson Company.

Scherman suggested approaching the manufacturer of a product the high cost of which might justify inclusion of a premium. Growing up in Philadelphia, Scherman was familiar with the Whitman's Candy Company of Philadelphia and in 1916 proposed to Whitman's the concept of the “Library Package”, a box that would include a copy of a literary classic enclosed with Whitman's chocolates. Whitman’s Co. ordered a total of 15,000 copies of fifteen of Shakespeare's plays. The team scrambled to collect the $5,000 startup capital needed to print the books, which they acquired with the help of A. L. Pelton.

The enterprise prospered. Scherman resigned from J. Walter Thompson to become president of the Little Leather Library Corporation and oversee production. After the Whitman’s order came additional titles, sold by Woolworth's for ten cents each. In 1917, it is estimated Woolworth's ordered over 1 million copies. The Little Leather Library Corp. later issued a set of “Thirty World’s Greatest Masterpieces,” capitalizing on the clamor for access to liberal culture and providing consumers with a “handsome mahogany or quartered oak bookrack ... attractive enough to ornament any library table” for purchasers to display their refinement. In the first year, sixty titles — all in the public domain — were published, and one million were sold in a little over a year.

== World War I ==
World War I affected production and distribution of the Little Leather Library titles. As leather prices rose, primarily due to the demand for leather during World War I, the publishers switched to synthetic bindings which, it turned out, smelled bad in hot weather. Despite that setback, by 1920 the Little Leather Library had marketed over twenty-five million volumes, many of them by mail.

During World War I, the Little Leather Library Corporation marketed their volumes as gifts to send to soldiers and sailors overseas as “Something that will make their minds normal, and keep them normal.” A box, ready for shipping to overseas soldiers, was offered with the purchase of ten books.

Whitman’s modified its Library Package and renamed it “Service Chocolates—Sweets with a book," a “vest-pocket edition of classics”, packed with the company’s chocolates, that could be purchased and sent overseas to American troops.

== Mail-Order Markets ==
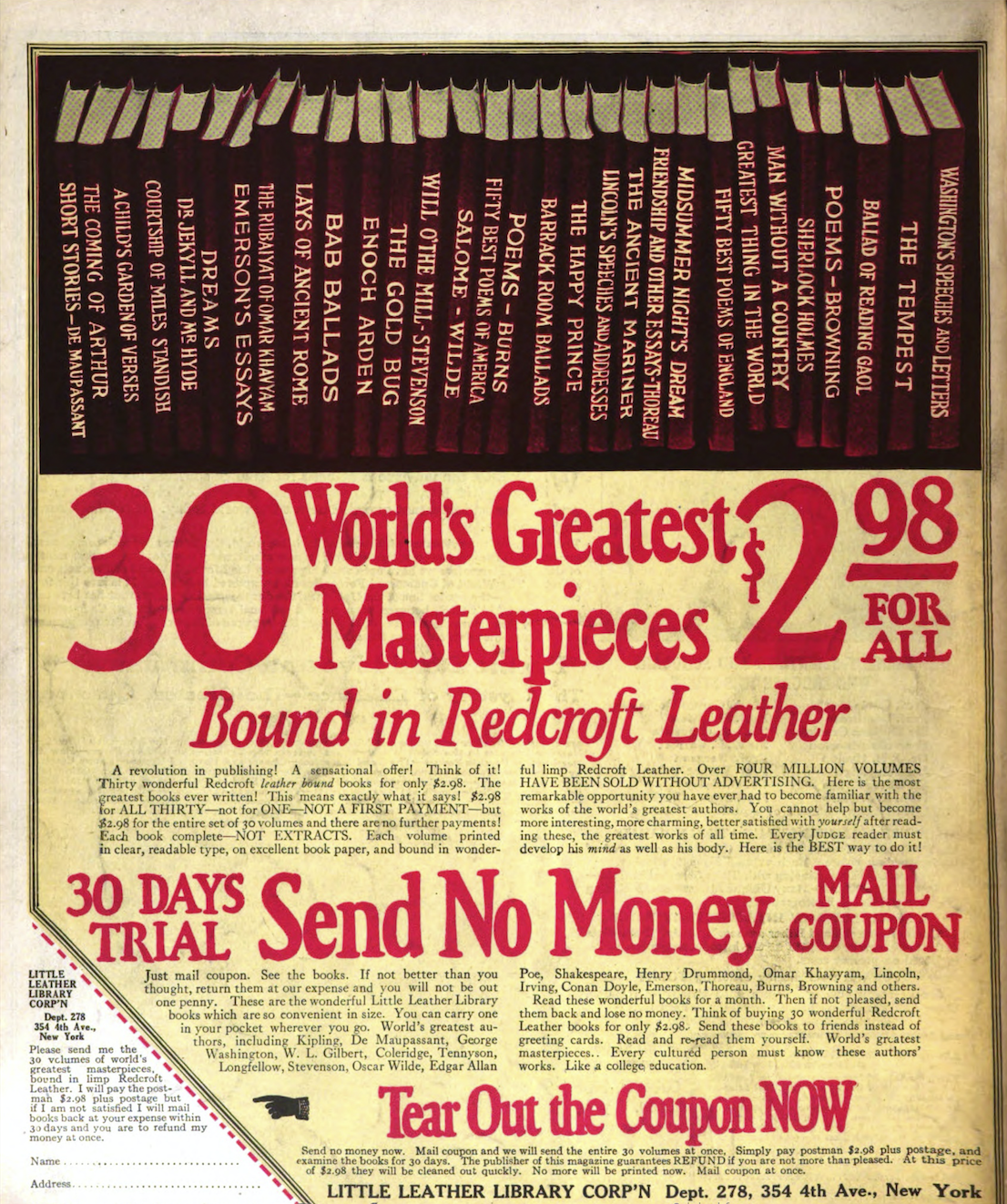
Advertisement for the Little Leather Library Corporation in Judge, 26 Feb 1921.

In 1920, Scherman and Sackheim began marketing the books directly by mail. The mail-order scheme relied on a combination of publication advertising and direct circulating to reach those who bought only by mail as well as individuals who might never set foot in traditional bookstores . A 30-volume set was marketed at $2.98.

In 1917, the Boni brothers sold their interest in the company and went on to other undertakings, including the founding of the Modern Library with Horace Liveright. In 1920, aware that they must be approaching a saturation point, Scherman and Sackheim decided to diversify and formed the advertising firm of Sackheim & Scherman. Their experiences at the Little Leather Library Corporation taught them that although they had tapped a profitable wellspring of customers by operating outside retail outlets, they could not be profitable unless buyers were "hooked" to return for continuing purchases. They took these lessons with them to their next enterprise, the Book-of-the-Month Club, which they founded in 1926.

The company was eventually bought out by Robert K. Haas, who worked for the mail-order subsidiary of J. Walter Thompson. In 1922 he purchased a seventy-five-percent controlling interest in the Little Leather Library Corporation and renamed the company as published by the new Robert K. Haas, Inc. (Little Leather Library changed to Little Luxart Company, as embossed on the back cover of the new shiny red leatherette books.) But by 1925, the company was no longer publishing new volumes. The publishing house of Funk & Wagnalls contracted for 250,000 thirty-volume sets from Robert K. Haas, Inc, which they offered to send free to any subscriber who would promise to take The Literary Digest for a year.

== 21st Century Market Value ==
Although its heyday was brief, the company’s successful marketing strategies meant that the market was flooded with millions of copies of the volumes. It is easy to find copies on the market; many families have incomplete or full sets passed down through the generations. A boxed set of 30 volumes might sell from $50 to $100.
