= Makel =

Makel is a surname. Notable people with the surname include:

- Eleanor L. Makel (1914–1992), American doctor and government official
- Lee Makel (born 1973), English footballer
