= Axel Rosin =

Axel Gerhardt Rosin
- Born: December 11, 1907; Berlin, Germany
- Died: March 27, 2007 (age 99)
- Education: J.D. Berlin University
- Known for: President of the Book-of-the-Month Club
- Spouse: Katharine Scherman
- Children: 2
- Family: Harry Scherman (father-in-law); Thomas Scherman (brother-in-law)

Axel Gerhardt Rosin (December 11, 1907 – March 27, 2007) was a philanthropist, president of the Book-of-the-Month Club and chairman emeritus of the Scherman Foundation.

== Biography ==
Rosin was born in Berlin and graduated from Berlin University with a J.D. degree in 1930. He worked as a lawyer for the Supreme Court of Prussia until 1934, when he emigrated to the United States after the Nazis banned Jews from entering courthouses. He subsequently worked for a shoe manufacturer in Virginia. In 1943 he married Katharine Scherman, and was made comptroller of the Book-of-the-Month Club, which had been founded by Ms. Scherman's father Harry Scherman in 1926. His brother-in-law is conductor Thomas Scherman. Rosin became president of the company in 1960, a position he held until 1973, and was then chairman until his retirement in 1979. His decision in 1967 to pay $250,000 for the right to offer William Manchester's book, The Death of a President as a club selection helped to foster the company's resurgence. During Rosin's leadership the company's annual sales doubled and membership reached 1.25 million.

Overseeing the Scherman Foundation, Rosin was responsible for distributing grant monies to organizations promoting the arts, social welfare programs, the environment, disarmament, and reproductive rights.

He has two daughters with his wife, Karen Rosin Sollins and Susanna Rosin Bergtold. Sollins is the developer of the Trivial File Transfer Protocol.
