= Thomas Scherman =

American conductor (1917–1979)

Thomas Kielty Scherman (February 12, 1917 – May 14, 1979) was an American conductor and the founder of the Little Orchestra Society.

== Biography ==
He was a son of Bernardine (née Kielty) and Harry Scherman, founder and president of the Book of the Month Club. His father was Jewish and his mother was of Irish and Welsh descent. His sister is Katharine Scherman Rosin (married to Axel Rosin). He attended Columbia University and then studied piano with Isabelle Vengerova and conducting with Carl Bamberger and Otto Klemperer. He served in the U.S. Army (1939–1941), reaching the rank of captain. In 1961, he conducted the Naumburg Orchestral Concerts, in the Naumburg Bandshell, Central Park, in the summer series. He conducted the world premiere of Hugo Weisgall's opera Athaliah on February 17, 1964 at Philharmonic Hall, New York.
