= Edith M. Stern =

American novelist

Edith Mendel Stern (24 June 1901 – 8 February 1975) was a novelist, book editor, journalist, critic, and writer of books and booklets written as guides on how to cope with problems related to aging, mental illness, and disabled children.

== Biography ==
Born to a Jewish family in New York City, Edith Mendel earned a B.A. from Barnard College in 1922. She was on the editorial staff of Alfred A. Knopf and subsequently on the editorial staffs of several other publishing houses, including Boni & Liveright. She married William A. Stern II, a Justice Department lawyer. After publishing four novels from 1927 to 1935, she wrote books on mental health aimed at a popular audience.

== Works ==
=== Novels ===
- Purse Strings. NY: Boni & Liveright. 1927.
- Scarlet Heels. NY: H. Liveright. 1928.
- Men Are Clumsy Lovers. NY: Vanguard Press. 1934.
- Escape from Youth. NY: Coward-McCann. 1935.

=== Nonfiction books and pamphlets ===
- with Samuel Warren Hamilton, MD: Mental Illness: A Guide for the Family. The Commonwealth fund. 1942. (5th edition 1968)
- with Mary E. Corcoran: The Attendant's Guide. The Commonwealth fund. 1945.
- with Howard W. Hopkirk: The Housemother's Guide. The Commonwealth fund. 1946.
- with Samuel Warren Hamilton, MD: Better Mental Hospitals: A Guide for the Citizen. 1947. (revised edition. National Association for Mental Health. 1955.)
- with Elsa Castendyck: The Handicapped Child: A Guide for Parents. 1950.
- with Mabel Ross: You and Your Aging Parents. NY: A. A. Wyn. 1952.; revised edition. NY: Harper & Row. 1965.
- Notes for After 50. 1955.
- A Full Life After 65. Public affairs pamphlet, no. 347. Public Affairs Committee. 1963.
