= Donald S. Klopfer =

Publisher, author

- Born: Donald Simon Klopfer; January 23, 1902; New York, New York
- Died: May 30, 1986 (aged 84); New York, New York
- Education: Columbia College (did not graduate); Williams College (did not graduate)
- Occupation: Publisher
- Spouse(s): Marian Annsbacker; Florence Selwyn (193_–71); Kathleen (Katie) Scofield Louchheim (1981–his death)
- Writing career
- Language: English

Donald Simon Klopfer (January 23, 1902 – May 30, 1986) was an American publisher, one of the founders of American publishing firm Random House, along with Bennett Cerf. Klopfer was the quiet inside businessman to Cerf's quite-visible and gregarious "Mr. Outside" personality.

== Background ==
Donald Simon Klopfer was born on 23 January 1902 in New York City to Jewish parents, Simon Klopfer and Stella Klopfer Jacobson (née Danzinger). He entered Columbia College but transferred to Williams College. He entered with the class of 1922 but did not graduate from Williams College either.

== Career ==
As a young man, Klopfer worked as a treasurer from 1921 to 1925 for his step-father, a diamond cutter at the United Diamond Works, Inc. in Newark, New Jersey. In 1925, his friend Bennett Cerf presented with him an opportunity to buy for $200,000 the classic imprint, Modern Library, from Boni & Liveright. Klopfer and Cerf formed a partnership, completed the purchase, and went into business as 50/50 partners. They increased the series' popularity, and in 1927 began publishing general trade books which they selected "at random." Thus began their publishing business, which in time they named Random House. It used as its logo a little house drawn by Cerf's friend and fellow Columbia alumnus Rockwell Kent. Cerf's talent in building and maintaining relationships brought contracts with such writers as William Faulkner, John O'Hara, Eugene O'Neill, James Michener, Truman Capote, Theodor Seuss Geisel, and others. Klopfer ran the business and book production. From 1942 to 1945, Klopfer served as a USAAF major in the European Theater.

Cerf retired in 1970, with Klopfer succeeding him as chairman; he retired in 1975.

== Personal life and death ==
Klopfer's first wife, Florence Selwyn, died in 1979, and Klopfer married the well-known writer and Democratic political activist Katie Louchheim on 19 July 1981.

Cerf and Klopfer were both prominent Jewish businessmen. In 1967, Klopfer resigned from the American Council for Judaism after the Council issued a statement which Klopfer and other Jewish leaders found to be repugnant.

He was a member of the Harmonie Club.

Klopfer died at Lenox Hill Hospital in New York, New York, on May 30, 1986, aged 84. Klopfer was survived by his second wife, a step-son, C.A. "Tony" Wimpfheimer (with his first wife), and a daughter, Lois Klopfer Levy.

== Awards ==
Before his death, Klopfer received an honorary degree by Williams College, in spite of never having completed his degree requirements.

== Works ==
In 2012, Random House published a book of collected World War II letters titled Dear Donald, Dear Bennett: The Wartime Correspondence of Donald Klopfer and Bennett Cerf.

- Dear Donald, Dear Bennett: the wartime correspondence of Donald Klopfer and Bennett Cerf (New York: Random House, 2002). ISBN 0-375-50768-X
