= Leslie Jones (conductor) =

British lawyer and conductor

Leslie Jones (23 November 1905 – 18 October 1982) was a British lawyer and conductor.

== Early career ==
Jones played saxhorn in the local Salvation Army band in his home town. At age eleven, he became an organist and learned to play trombone. He took music lessons from the composer Theophilus Hemmings, and eventually became a Trinity's Licentiate (LTCL), an Associate of the Royal College of Organists (ARCO), and an Associate of the Royal College of Music (ARCM). Jones also studied law, became a solicitor, and set up his own practice which he ran for thirty years.

Before World War II, Jones formed the Newcastle-under-Lyme String Orchestra (today Newcastle Strings) and after the war he founded the Stoke-on-Trent Symphony Orchestra. Later, he created his own Leslie Jones Orchestra, led by Martin Milner, a leader of The Hallé Orchestra, using professionals and qualified students. This orchestra gave more than two dozens of concerts each year.

== The Little Orchestra of London ==
After having retired from the law practice, Jones moved south, and could devote more time to music. In 1957, he created The Little Orchestra of London. The name was suggested by Jones' son, Leslie Jnr, as a counterpart to Thomas Scherman's Little Orchestra Society in New York.

The players came from the London "pool", which consisted of prominent orchestral musicians – James Galway, Alan Loveday and Derek Wickens, to mention a few. Raymond Cohen led the orchestra in the early days, and in later years the leader was William Armon. Occasionally the orchestra played at open concerts, but the main purpose seems to have been to do gramophone recordings.

Jones was at the forefront of the movement to reduce the size of Haydn orchestras, and usually directed himself from the keyboard. Being an early advocate of period performance practice, he recorded Joseph Haydn's "Paris" and "London" symphonies. He recorded about fifty of Haydn's symphonies. The interpretations of the late symphonies of Haydn were very 'classical' for the period of their performance. The early recordings were released on Pye Records. From 1966 Jones started to record for Nonesuch Records, while it seems that after 1969 he recorded mostly with Oryx records.

== Discography ==
=== Pye recordings ===
- Antonín Dvořák, Peter Tchaikovsky: String serenades, Pye Golden Guinea Collector Series (1964)
- Joseph Haydn: Symphonies 19, 31, 45. Pye (1964). Reissued as Nonesuch H-71031.
- Joseph Haydn: Symphonies 44, 49, Ouverture Armida. Pye Golden Guinea Collector Series GSGC 14006 (1964). Reissued as Nonesuch H-71032.
- Joseph Haydn: Symphonies 12, 26, 83. Pye (1965), reissued as Nonesuch H-71083.
- Joseph Haydn: Symphonies 6, 13, 64. Pye Golden Guinea Records (1965)
- Alan Rawsthorne, Lennox Berkeley, Peter Racine Fricker: Concerto for String Orchestra; Serenade for Strings; Prelude, Elegy and Finale. Pye Golden Guinea Records (1965)
- Joseph Haydn: Symphonies 43, 35, 80. Pye Golden Guinea Records GGC 4046 (1965)
- Joseph Haydn: Symphonies 3, 39, 73. PRT GSGC 7055 (1965)
- Joseph Haydn: Symphonies 34, 54, 75. Pye Golden Guinea Collector Series (1966). Reissued as Nonesuch H-71106.
- Michael Haydn: Symphonies in G, P.16 and A, P.31; Violin Concerto A. Pye Golden Guinea Records GGC 14131 (1970)
- Alan Rawsthorne: Concerto for String Orchestra; Piano Quintet; Sonata for Cello and Piano. Pye PRT GSGC 7060 (1965)

=== Nonesuch recordings ===
- Joseph Haydn: Symphonies 77, 61. Nonesuch H-71168 (1967)
- Carl Philipp Emanuel Bach: Four Orchestral Works, Wq 183. Nonesuch H-71180 (1967)
- Joseph Haydn: Symphonies 100, 103. Nonesuch Checkmate C 76002 (1967)
- Johann Christian Bach: Sinfonias, Op. 18, Nos 3 & 5; Sinfonia Concertante C. Nonesuch H-71165 (1968)
- Joseph Haydn: The Seven Last Words of Christ, orchestral version. Nonesuch H-71154 (1969)
- Joseph Haydn: The six "Paris" Symphonies. Nonesuch HC-73011 (published 1967)
- Joseph Haydn: Symphonies 44, 49, Armida ouverture. Nonesuch H-71032 (before 1969)
- Joseph Haydn: Symphonies 13, 29, 64. Nonesuch H-71121 (before 1969)
- Joseph Haydn: Symphonies 35, 43, 80. Nonesuch H-71131 (before 1969)
- Joseph Haydn: Symphonies 90, 91. Nonesuch H-71191 (announced in the 1969–1970 Nonesuch Supplement)
- Joseph Haydn: Symphonies 63, 78, Overture to an English Opera. Nonesuch H-71197 (announced in the 1969–1970 Nonesuch Supplement)
- Joseph Haydn: The 12 London Symphonies. (6 LP box) Nonesuch HF-73019 (announced in the 1969–1970 Nonesuch Supplement)

=== Oryx and other labels ===
- Joseph Haydn: Six Divertimenti, Op. 31. Oryx 1740 (1969)
- Ludwig van Beethoven: Symphonies 1 & 8. Unicorn Records UNS 200 (1969)
- Scandinavian String Music (Grieg, Nielsen, Sibelius). Unicorn Records UNS 201 (1969)
- John Stanley: 6 concertos, Op. 2. Pelca PSR(O) 40703, Oryx 1742 (1970), Desto DC 7189 (1980)
- Joseph Haydn: Symphonies 101, 104. Oryx ORPS 18, remake (1972)
- J. S. Bach: Violin Concerto; Harpsichord concertos BWV 1052 & 1056. Harold Lester, William Armon. Basic Record Library BRL 7 (1972)
- G. F. Handel: The Water Music (complete). Oryx ORPS-15 (1972)
- G. F. Handel: Music for the Royal Fireworks, Concerto a due cori F. Basic Record Library; Oryx ORPS 16 (1973)
- W. A. Mozart: Clarinet and Oboe Concertos. Thea King, Derek Wickens. Sequence SEQ 22103 and Oryx ORPS 21 (1973)
- Louis Spohr, J. H. Hummel: Notturno C, Op. 34; Octet – Partita. Oryx 1830 (1973)

=== Heritage Records (rereleases on CD) ===
- The Leslie Jones Collection Vol. I (Bach, Handel, Haydn, Mozart) 4 CDs, HTGCD 404
- The Leslie Jones Collection Vol. II (Mozart, Hummel, Spohr, Beethoven, Dvorak) 3 CDs, HTGCD 303
