= Harry Scherman =

American publisher and economist (1887–1969)

- Born: February 1, 1887
- Died: November 12, 1969 (aged 82)
- Occupations: Publisher and economist
- Notable work: Co-founder of the Book of the Month Club

Isaac Harry Scherman (February 1, 1887 – November 12, 1969) was an American publisher and economist, most notable as the co-founder of the Book of the Month Club. He also wrote four books on economics.

== Biography ==
=== Early life and education ===
Isaac Harry Scherman was born February 1, 1887, in Montreal, Quebec, Canada. He was the youngest of five children born to Katherine Harris and Jacob Scherman. After his parents separated, Harry and his brothers Louis and William were placed in an orphanage in Atlanta, Georgia, where they lived from 1893 to 1899. He attended Central High School in Philadelphia, where his classmates included Alexander Woollcott, the future Algonquin Round Table member and radio personality, and Ed Wynn, the famous actor. Scherman graduated high school in 1905, and later completed university studies at the Wharton School and the University of Pennsylvania Law School.

=== Career ===
His first jobs included working for Louis Lipsky at "The American Hebrew" newspaper, with the Ruthrauff and Ryan advertising firm, and the J. Walter Thompson Company. In 1916, he established the Little Leather Library and, in 1926, he co-founded the Book of the Month Club.

Following the establishment of the Book of The Month Club, Scherman published several works in his own right. In one such work, The Promises Men Live By, published in 1938 he developed an analysis of economic problems in terms of people's beliefs. He was critical of accepted policies relating to the then fashionable Keynesianism.

=== Marriage and children ===
Scherman married Bernardine Kielty on June 3, 1914. Kielty was of Irish and Welsh descent and had moved to New York City from a small town in New England where she met Scherman. Kielty was also a writer of non-fiction, juvenile fiction and a book columnist for The Ladies Home Journal. The couple had two children, Katharine Scherman Rosin (1915–2009), a writer of non-fiction, and Thomas Scherman (1917–1979), a recorded conductor of classical music, who also founded the Little Orchestra Society of New York City.

=== Death and afterward ===
Scherman died November 12, 1969, in Manhattan, New York.

His collected papers were purchased by the University of Georgia's Hargrett Rare Book and Manuscript Library in 1993.

== Published works ==
- The Promises Men Live By (Random House, 1938)
- The Real Danger in Our Gold 1940
- Will We Have Inflation? 1941
- The Last Best Hope of Earth Random House, New York 1941.
