= Samuel Warren Hamilton =

American physician

Samuel Warren Hamilton, M.D. (1878–1951) was an American physician and psychiatrist who was an expert in the organization of mental hospitals.

== Early life ==
Hamilton was born in Brandon, Vermont to Warren Henry Hamilton and Mary Salome Turrill, and was the fourth generation of physicians. He attended local public schools. He entered the University of Vermont and earned his A. B. degree in 1898. His medical education was at the Columbia University College of Physicians and Surgeons and earned his M.D. in 1903. He spent a year in training at the Children's Hospital of New York followed by a year at the Lying-in Hospital of the City of New York.

== Career ==
From 1905 to 1909, he served as an assistant physician at the Manhattan State Mental Hospital, and then transferred to the Utica State Hospital (New York State Lunatic Asylum), where he served as a psychiatrist from 1910 to 1916. Between 1911 and 1912, he studied at the University of Breslau, Germany, and worked in the mental and nervous clinics.

In 1917, he became director of the New York Police's new Police Psychopathic Laboratory. When the US entered World War I, Hamilton enlisted in the U.S. Army. He spent two years as a psychiatrist with the 42nd Division and the Third Army. Upon his return from Europe, he became the Medical Director at the Philadelphia Hospital for Mental Disorder and served in this position from 1920 to 1922. Then, he took the position of Assistant Medical Director at the private hospital, Bloomingdale Insane Asylum which was affiliated with the Cornell Medical School and the New York Hospital. He remained at Bloomingdale from 1923 to 1936. During those years, he also served as director of Hospital Service for the National Committee for Mental Hygiene, a voluntary lay organization. This period began a career of surveys of public mental hospitals under the auspices of the National Committee for Mental Hygiene and later, the American Psychiatric Association, the American Neurological Association, the U.S. Public Health Service, and the Rockefeller Foundation.

Hamilton's experience in state mental hospitals came to the fore in the 1930s. The public mental hospitals in the various states had become overcrowded, understaffed, and received inadequate funding. Public interest had been aroused by publications of hospitals' conditions. In 1935, the American Medical Association (AMA) began an investigation at the instigation of its Mental Health committee. The AMA surveys were discontinued and only a statistical report of the findings was published, with no known further action. Later, the American Psychiatric Association (APA) took up the effort and joined the national and state mental health associations in the effort to improve conditions in the mental hospitals. In 1928, the State Society for Mental Health of Connecticut obtained funds to conduct a survey of mental hospitals, under the direction of Hamilton. The survey was published in 1936 with numerous recommendations. The survey reports met wide acceptance as numerous states began obtaining funds for similar surveys, which often resulted in increased funding by state legislatures to improve conditions in the state mental hospitals.

Following his U.S. Army service during World War II, Hamilton accepted the position as Superintendent of the Essex Overbrook Hospital in New Jersey. He stayed there until 1950. He returned to Burlington, Vermont to continue his consultant activities. In 1951, the Governor of Vermont requested Hamilton's expertise with the Women's State Reformatory in Rutland, Vermont.

== Other activities ==
Hamilton taught during his various posts: the Canandaigua Academy in New York (1898–1899), the Allen School in New York (1900–1901), the Women's Medical College of New York (1920–1922), Associate Professor at the University of Pennsylvania and the Post Graduate School of Medicine (1920–1925).

He was a member of numerous professional organizations: the American Medical Association (AMA), the American Psychopathological Association (President in 1938), and the American Psychiatric Association (APA, president in 1946–1947). He served as an advisor to the U.S. Public Health Service from 1939 to 1947, and was an active participant in the founding of the American Board of Psychiatry and Neurology.

== Death ==
He died of a heart attack in 1951.

== Works ==
Hamilton, Samuel Warren. "Review of Infective-Exhaustive Psychoses with Special Reference to Subdivision and Prognosis," American Journal of Psychiatry 66(4) (April 1910): 579–586.

Hamilton, Samuel Warren, and Roy Haber. Summaries of State Laws Relating to the Feebleminded and the Epileptic. New York: National Committee for Mental Hygiene, 1917.

Hamilton, Samuel Warren. Report of the Rhode Island Mental Hygiene Survey, requested by Governor Emery J. San Souci and by the Penal and Charitable Commission. New York, 1924.

Hamilton, Samuel Warren. Report of the Connecticut Mental Hygiene Study. [New Haven, Quinnipiack Press, 1930].

Hamilton, Samuel Warren. "The Psychiatric Resources of New York: A Brief Description for those Attending the 1934 Meeting," American Journal of Psychiatry 90(5) (March 1934): 1097–1128.

Hamilton, Samuel Warren, and Grover A. Kempf. "Trends in the Activities of Mental Hospitals," American Journal of Psychiatry 96(3) (Nov. 1939): 551–574.

Hamilton, Samuel Warren, et al. A Study of the Public Mental Hospitals of the United States, 1937-39. Washington, DC: U.S. Government Printing Office, 1941.

Stern, Edith M., and Samuel Warren Hamilton. The Mental Hospital: A Guide for the Citizen. New York: The Commonwealth Fund, 1942.

Hamilton, Samuel Warren. "The History of Mental Hospitals" in One Hundred Years of American Psychiatry. New York: Publication for the American Psychiatric Association by Columbia University Press, 1944.

Stern, Edith M., and Samuel Warren Hamilton. Better Mental Hospitals: A Guide for the Citizen. New York: National Committee for Mental Hygiene, 1947.
