= Modern Library =

American publishing company

- Parent company: Random House
- Founded: 1917
- Founders: Albert Boni, Horace Liveright
- Country of origin: United States
- Headquarters location: New York City
- Publication types: Books
- Official website: modernlibrary.com

The Modern Library is an American book publishing imprint and formerly the parent company of Random House. Founded in 1917 by Albert Boni and Horace Liveright as an imprint of their publishing company Boni & Liveright, Modern Library became an independent publishing company in 1925 when Boni & Liveright sold it to Bennett Cerf and Donald Klopfer. Random House began in 1927 as a subsidiary of the Modern Library and eventually overtook its parent company, with Modern Library becoming an imprint of Random House.

== Recent history ==
The Modern Library originally published only hardbound books. In 1950, it began publishing the Modern Library College Editions, a forerunner of its current series of paperback classics. From 1955 to 1960, the company published a high quality, numbered paperback series, but discontinued it in 1960, when the series was merged into the newly acquired Vintage paperbacks group. The Modern Library homepage states:

In 1992, on the occasion of the Modern Library's seventy-fifth anniversary, Random House embarked on an ambitious project to refurbish the series. We revived the torchbearer emblem that Cerf and Klopfer commissioned in 1925 from Lucian Bernhard. The Promethean bearer of enlightenment (known informally around the old Modern Library offices as the "dame running away from Bennett Cerf") was redesigned several times over the years, most notably by Rockwell Kent.

In 1998, novelist David Ebershoff became the Modern Library's new Publishing Director. Ebershoff managed the imprint until 2005, when he resigned to concentrate on his own writing and to become editor-at-large at Random House.

== Modern Library lists ==
At its onset the Modern Library identified itself as "The Modern Library of the World's Best Books". In keeping with that brand identity, in 1998 the editors created the "Modern Library List of Best 20th-Century Novels", numbering 100 titles selected from books published by Modern Library and its Random House affiliates. They also conducted an internet poll of public opinion, then produced a readers' list. (The lists were actually restricted to works in English, but titles of the lists do not represent this, and little attention was paid to that fact in publicity for the lists.)

The "top ten" of the editors' list is shown here—and the two "100 Best Novels" lists are linked below.

According to a New York Times article about the list, executives at Random House said they hoped that as the century drew to a close their list would encourage public debate about the greatest works of fiction of the last hundred years, thus both increasing awareness of the Modern Library and stimulating sales of novels the group publishes.

Both lists have incurred criticism. Their ranking system concerned many professional scholars and critics. The board members themselves, who did not create the rankings and were unaware of it until the list was published, expressed disappointment and puzzlement. There were also hypotheses that the Modern Library merely made a selection based on its stocklist. A. S. Byatt, the well-known English novelist who was on the board, called the list "typically American".

The list was compiled via approval voting, by sending each board member a list of 440 pre-selected books from the Modern Library catalogue and asking each member to place a check beside novels they wished to choose. Then the works with the most votes were ranked the highest, and ties were decided arbitrarily by Random House publishers. This explains surprising results like the No. 5 placement of Brave New World (1932), which most of the judges agreed belonged somewhere on the list, but much lower than the very top.

David Ebershoff, the Modern Library division's publishing director, stated in a follow-up "the people who were drawn to go to the Modern Library Web site and compelled to vote have a certain enthusiasm about books and their favourite books that many people don't, so that the voting population is skewed." In addition, people were allowed to vote repeatedly, once per day, making the poll a measure of how much effort people would put into promoting their favorite books. Others have been more direct in their descriptions of the results; librarian Robert Teeter remarks that the ballot boxes were "stuffed by cultists".

== See also ==
- Modern Library 100 Best Nonfiction

== Bibliography ==
- Lise Jaillant, Modernism, Middlebrow and the Literary Canon - the Modern Library Series (London: Pickering & Chatto, 2014)
- Gordon B. Neavill, “The Modern Library Series: Format and Design, 1917-1977,” Printing History 1 (1979): 26–37.
- Gordon B. Neavill, “The Modern Library Series and American Cultural Life,” Journal of Library History 16 (Spring 1981): 241–52.
- Gordon B. Neavill, “Publishing in Wartime: The Modern Library Series during the Second World War,” Library Trends 55 (Winter 2007): 583–96.
- Gordon B. Neavill, “Canonicity, Reprint Publishing, and Copyright,” in The Culture of the Publisher’s Series, vol. 1: Authors, Publishers and the Shaping of Taste, edited by John Spiers (Basingstoke, Hampshire; New York: Palgrave Macmillan, 2011), pp. 88–105.
- Jay Satterfield, The World's Best Books": Taste, Culture, and the Modern Library (University of Massachusetts Press, 2002).
