= Horace Liveright =

American publisher and stage producer

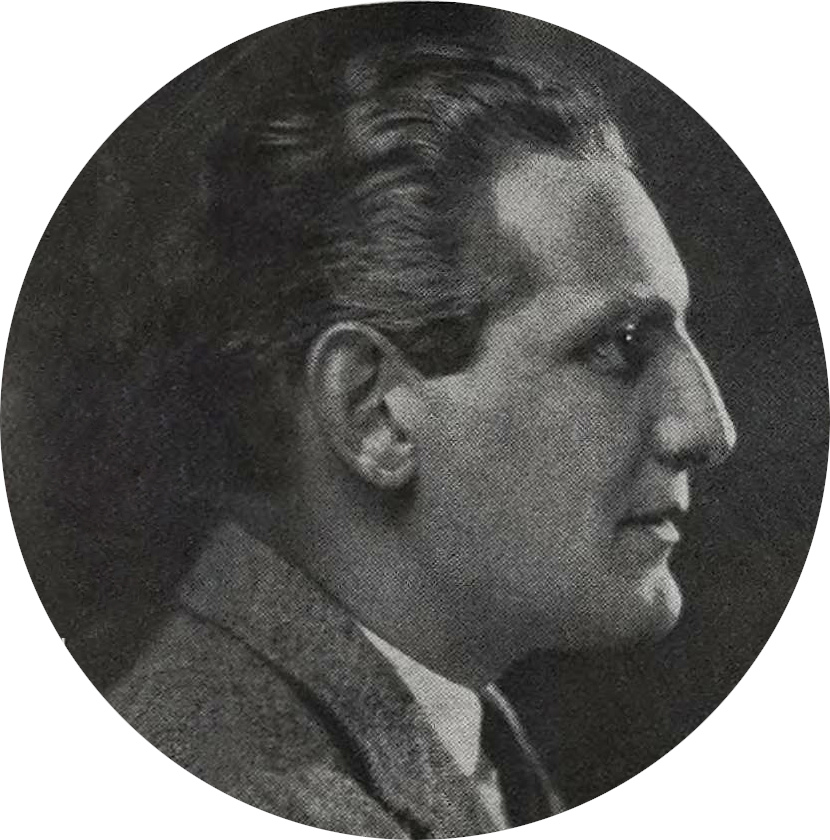
Horace Liveright, publisher and producer

Horace Brisbin Liveright (pronounced "LIVE-right," anglicized by Horace's father from the German Liebrecht; 10 December 1884 – 24 September 1933) was an American publisher and stage producer. With Albert Boni, he founded the Modern Library and Boni & Liveright publishers. He published the books of numerous influential American and British authors. Turning to theatre, he produced the successful 1927 Broadway play Dracula, with Béla Lugosi and Edward Van Sloan in the roles they would make famous in the 1931 film by the same name.

== Early life ==
Liveright was born into a Jewish family in 1884, in Osceola Mills, Pennsylvania. He initially followed the career of a bond salesman. He married Lucille Elsas, the daughter of Herman Elsas, the owner of a paper company that merged into International Paper; Elsas was subsequently an officer and director of the merged company. Liveright's marriage took place in April 1911, and Liveright used his father-in-law's financial backing to embark on a publishing career.

== Publishing career ==
In 1917 Liveright founded the Modern Library and Boni & Liveright publishers in New York with business partner Albert Boni. Modern Library was formed as a reprinting line, publishing inexpensive books from European modernists, while Boni & Liveright published the work of contemporary Americans. Liveright published work by T. S. Eliot (The Waste Land), Charles Fort (The Book of the Damned), Theodore Dreiser (An American Tragedy), and Bertrand Russell (Marriage and Morals). The company also published the first books by Ernest Hemingway, William Faulkner, Hart Crane, Dorothy Parker, and S. J. Perelman.

Liveright believed that books could be marketed similarly to other media and was among the first to aggressively sell novels. Liveright was also a vocal campaigner against the strict literary censorship of the period.

Despite their successes, Liveright and Boni's relationship broke down and the pair chose to part ways. It is reported that they flipped a coin to decide who would buy the other out, and Liveright gained control. In 1923, Liveright's alcoholism started to take its toll. Throwing frequent, lavish parties, he would over-indulge many nights per week.

== Stage production ==
Liveright started his stage production career in 1924. His initial choices of plays were not successful, and he had to use an increasing amount of money from his publishing company. His faltering financial status meant that he had to sell the Modern Library to then-vice-president Bennett Cerf in 1925. Liveright started to put money from the publishing company into Broadway productions but soon found that the erratic success of the Boni & Liveright publishers was not a secure income; the Modern Library had been the backbone of his finances. In 1928 he lost control of Boni & Liveright and was pushed out entirely by 1930.

Liveright achieved success in theatre. His production of Dracula debuted on 5 October 1927, three years after the first authorized adaptation by Hamilton Deane. Liveright had employed John L. Balderston to revise the script for an American audience. He brought in Béla Lugosi to play Dracula (his first major English-speaking role). Edward Van Sloan played Van Helsing. The actors reprised these roles in Tod Browning's 1931 film by the same name. Despite an income of over $2 million from the play, Liveright failed to fulfill his business responsibilities, never paying $678.01 in royalties to Florence Balcombe, the widow of the original author Bram Stoker.

== Personal life ==
The Liverights had two children, Herman and Lucy. Lucille divorced Liveright on grounds of misconduct in 1928, alleging "misconduct with an actress in an inn near Croton-on-Hudson."

In December 1931 he married the actress Elise Bartlett, who had appeared in Show Boat and had divorced actor Joseph Schildkraut in 1930. She filed for divorce four months later.

Liveright died of pneumonia on September 24, 1933, aged forty-nine. Years of alcoholism and his business failures likely contributed to his death. Bennett Cerf also explains that his hand was bitten badly by a woman he'd been arguing with, necessitating a long, grueling hospital stay shortly before his death. Six people were said to have attended his funeral.

== Portrayal and biography ==
- Ben Hecht wrote and directed the film The Scoundrel (1935), inspired by Liveright and his friend Tommy Smith. An Academy Award winner, it marked the on-screen debut for Noël Coward, who played the central character.
- Tom Dardis wrote a biography of Liveright, called Firebrand: The Life of Horace Liveright (1995) (ISBN 0679406751).
