= Manuel Komroff =

American dramatist

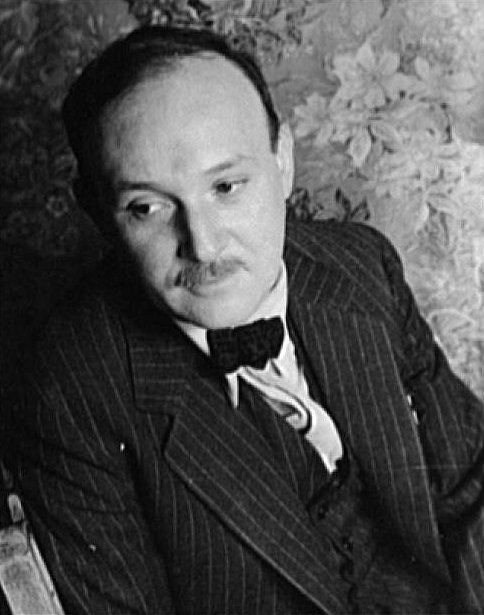
Manuel Komroff. Photo by Carl Van Vechten.

Manuel Komroff (September 7, 1890 – 10 December 1974) was an American playwright, screenwriter, novelist, editor and translator. He was born in New York where he began his working life as a journalist. He also spent some time in Russia during the Russian Revolution.

== Marco Polo ==
One of his most successful publications was his edited version of The Travels of Marco Polo, first published in 1926. He not only added a chapter which was missing in the William Marsden translation, but also revised parts of the Henry Yule editions.

== Works ==
=== Novels ===
- The Grace of Lambs (1925, Boni & Liveright)
- Juggler's Kiss (1927, Boni & Liveright)
- Coronet (1930, Coward-McCann)
- Two Thieves (1931, Coward-McCann)
- I, the Tiger (1933, Coward-McCann)
- The March of the Hundred (1939, Coward-McCann)
- The Christmas Letter (1941 American Artists Group, N.Y.)
- In the Years of Our Lord (1942, Harper & Bros.)
- Echo of Evil (1948, Farrar, Straus and Giroux)
- Disraeli (1963, Julian Messner)
- Talleyrand (1965, Julian Messner)

=== Non-fiction ===
- Contemporaries of Marco Polo (1928, Boni & Liveright)
- The Magic Bow: A Romance of Paganini (1940, Harper & Bros.)
- Big City, Little Boy (1953, A. A. Wyn)
- Napoleon (1954, J. Messner))
- Mozart (1956, Alfred A. Knopf)
- Beethoven and the World of Music (1962, Dodd, Mead & Co.)

== Portrait ==
There is a large 48x31" portrait of a 24-year-old, foppish Komroff, dated 1914, by Leon Kroll in the Portland Museum of Art ( Maine). Komroff is standing indoors, 3/4 view (to the knees), dressed to go outside. He is holding a large portfolio of papers in his right hand.
