= The Little Orchestra Society =

Orchestra in New York City (founded 1947)

- Orchestra
- Short name: LOS
- Founded: 1947, Thomas Scherman
- Location: New York City, U.S.
- Music director: David Alan Miller (Artistic Advisor)
- Website: www.littleorchestra.org

Not to be confused by The Little Orchestra of London

The Little Orchestra Society is an American orchestra based at 630 9th Avenue, Suite 807, in New York City. It was founded in 1947 by Thomas Scherman, who served as its conductor until his death in 1979. From 1979 to 2011, the orchestra was led by Dino Anagnost. Its membership has ranged between 45 and 60 musicians. The orchestra's name is borrowed from The Little Orchestra of London, which was formed by Felix Mendelssohn during the Bach Revival. In 2019, the orchestra named David Alan Miller its new artistic advisor.

Its first concert took place at The Town Hall in Manhattan on October 27, 1947. In 1959, the orchestra toured eight Asian countries, including Vietnam, Hong Kong, India, and Japan, performing the music of Henry Cowell.

Pierre Monteux guest conducted the orchestra on April 2, 1957, in a concert that included Johannes Brahms's Serenade No. 2 in A Major. Monteux had recorded the serenade in the preceding year, but this performance was also recorded.

The orchestra commissions new works and has given 65 world premieres (by composers including Franz Schubert, Douglas Moore, and David Diamond), and more than 175 U.S. and New York premieres by such composers as Antonio Vivaldi, John Corigliano, and Christopher Rouse.

== Discography ==
- Ludwig van Beethoven, Octet in E-Flat Major, Op. 103 & Rondino in E-Flat Major, Grove 146, Thomas Scherman conducting (EMS Recordings #1, 1950)
- Hello, World!/The Greatest Sound Around, Eleanor Roosevelt, narrator (on Hello World!), words and music by Susan Otto and William R. Mayer, The Little Orchestra Society, Thomas Scherman, conductor, John Langstaff, tenor (on The Greatest Sound Around) (RCA Victor Red Seal LM-2332, 1959)
