= Katharine Scherman =

American writer

Katharine Scherman Rosin (October 7, 1915 – December 11, 2009) was an American author of non-fiction.

== Life ==
Born in New York City, Katharine Scherman Rosin was the daughter of Harry Scherman and Bernardine Kielty Scherman. Her father was Jewish and her mother was of Irish and Welsh descent. She married Axel G. Rosin on April 10, 1943. She had two children, Karen and Susanna. She received a B.A. from Swarthmore College in 1938. Her interests include ornithology, mountain climbing, reading and music (she played piano and cello).

After graduating from college, Scherman worked as a secretary for the Sunday Review of Literature in New York City from 1940–41, while also working as an editor for J. B. Lippincott & Co. during the same period. From 1941 to 1944 she worked at Life as a researcher and writer. From 1944 to 1949 she was a writer and editor at Book-of-the-Month Club, during which time she married Axel Rosin, who was also working there. She authored ten books, the first in 1954 and the last in 1987.

== Bibliography ==
- The Slave Who Freed Haiti: The Story of Toussaint Louverture (juvenile), 1954. An account of Toussaint Louverture.
- Spring on an Arctic Island. 1956. Travel literature about a research trip to Bylot Island in 1954.
- Catherine the Great (juvenile). 1957. About Catherine the Great.
- The Sword of Siegfried (juvenile). 1959.
- William Tell (juvenile). 1961.
- The Long White Night. 1964.
- Two Islands: Grand Manan and Sanibel. 1971. Travel literature.
- Daughter of Fire: A Portrait of Iceland. 1976. Travel literature.
- The Flowering of Ireland. 1981. History of Ireland 5th to 12th centuries.
- The Birth of France: Warriors, Bishops, and Long-Haired Kings. 1987. A history of the Merovingian kings of France.
