= Katie Louchheim =

American poet and diplomat (1903–1991)

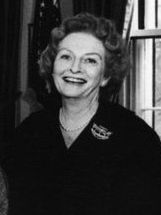
Katie Louchheim

Katie Louchheim (1903–1991) was a 20th-century American diplomat, Democratic National Committee (DNC) vice chair, poet, and writer.

== Background ==
Kathleen Scofield ("Katie") was born on December 28, 1903, in New York City. Her father, Leonard B. Schoenfeld, was a stockbroker; both parents were of German and Austrian Jewish ancestry. Her father changed their surname to "Scofield" to sound less German during World War I.

In 1921, she graduated from Rosemary Hall boarding school in Greenwich, Connecticut, where she was one of three Jewish girls in her class. In 1926, she started studies at Columbia University but had to stop in 1927 and went instead to secretarial school for financial reasons.

== Career ==
In October 1934, Louchheim moved from New York City to Washington, where her husband would help organize the Securities and Exchange Commission (SEC) under Joseph P. Kennedy during the first stage of FDR's New Deal.

During World War II, she served in the Office of Foreign Relief and Rehabilitation and helped form its United Nations counterpart, the United Nations Relief and Rehabilitation Administration (UNRRA). In 1945, she traveled to Europe to arrange press relations at camps for displaced people.

In the 1930s, Louchheim used their home in Georgetown to network. She raised funds for the Democratic National Committee (DNC). While fundraising for FDR's 1940 presidential campaign, she came to know Eleanor Roosevelt. In 1948 (and 1952), she was a DNC delegate for Washington, DC, and seconded the nomination for Helen Gahagan Douglas. In 1949, she became a member of the Washington, DC, committee of the DNC. By 1953, she was heading the DNC's Office of Women's Activities, succeeding India Edwards. By 1956, she had become DNC vice chair for Daisy Harriman, which she held through 1960. Also in 1956, she accompanied Adlai Stevenson II on his campaign for the presidency. In 1960, Robert F. Kennedy "booted" her from the DNC; instead, she campaigned for JFK.

U.S. President John F. Kennedy gave her the post of special assistant for women's affairs the U.S. Department of State, where in 1966 she became Deputy Assistant Secretary for Public Affairs–at the time, the highest level there achieved by a woman. She was the first woman to address the incoming class of junior Foreign Service Officers at their swearing-in ceremony in 1967.

In 1968, U.S. President Lyndon B. Johnson made her ambassador to UNESCO, a post she held until 1969 (when U.S. President Richard M. Nixon changed administration).

In 1971, she became a contributor to the Washington Post and Christian Science Monitor through 1973.

== Personal and death ==
On June 25, 1926, she married Walter C. Louchheim, Jr., an investment counselor, also of German-Jewish ancestry, in Hamburg, Germany; he died in 1973. They had two daughters. In 1981, she married Donald S. Klopfer, a co-founder of Random House; he died in 1986.

She died aged 87 of pneumonia on February 11, 1991, at her home in New York City.

== Legacy ==
The biographical dictionary Notable American Women calls her "the most important Democratic party woman in the 1950s."

The Katie Louchheim Papers are housed at the U.S. Library of Congress.

== Works ==
Her book By the Political Sea describes her career and interactions with: Harry S. Truman, Bess Truman, John F. Kennedy, Lyndon Baynes Johnson, Hubert Humphrey, Eugene McCarthy, Dean Acheson, and Adlai Stevenson II.

Her book The Making of the New Deal contained writings from New Dealers, including Alger Hiss, Donald Hiss, Thomas Corcoran, James H. Rowe, Robert C. Weaver, Paul A. Freund, Wilbur J. Cohen, Abe Fortas, David Riesman, and Joseph Rauh. (The brief bio for Alger Hiss in the back of the book mentions his Agricultural Adjustment Administration work, State Department, United Nations, and Carnegie Endowment for International Peace; avoids any mention of the Hiss-Chambers Case; and ends by mentioning that he lectures.

- With or Without Roses (1966) (poems)
- By the Political Sea (1970) (memoir)
- The Seeing Glass (1979) (poems)
- Observe the Lark (1985) (poems)
- The Making of the New Deal: The Insiders Speak (1983) (editor)

She also wrote the libretto for an opera by David Diamond, The Noblest Game, completed in 1975.
