= Random House =

American general-interest trade book publisher

- Logo with the 2014 Penguin Random House wordmark
- Formerly: Random House, Inc. (1965–2013)
- Type: Division
- Founded: 1927; 99 years ago
- Founders: Bennett Cerf, Donald Klopfer
- Headquarters: Random House Tower, 1745 Broadway, New York City, U.S.
- Area served: Worldwide
- Key people: Gina Centrello (president and publisher, The Random House Publishing Group); Barbara Marcus (president and publisher, Random House Children's Books); Nihar Malaviya (COO, Random House, Inc.)
- Products: Books
- Revenue: ▲€2.142 billion (2012)
- Number of employees: 97,104 (as of September 30, 2020)
- Parent: RCA (1965–1980); Advance Publications (1980–1998); Bertelsmann (1998–2013); Penguin Random House (2013–present)
- Website: randomhousebooks.com

Random House is an imprint and publishing group of Penguin Random House. Founded in 1927 by businessmen Bennett Cerf and Donald Klopfer as an imprint of Modern Library, it quickly overtook Modern Library as the parent imprint. Over the following decades, a series of acquisitions made it into one of the largest publishers in the United States. In 2013, it was merged with Penguin Group to form Penguin Random House, which is owned by the Germany-based media conglomerate Bertelsmann. Penguin Random House uses its brand for Random House Publishing Group and Random House Children's Books, as well as several imprints.

== Company history ==
=== 20th century ===
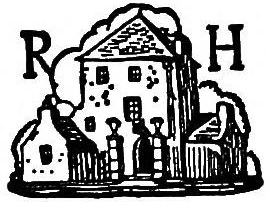
The company's first logo.

Random House was founded in 1927 by Bennett Cerf and Donald Klopfer, two years after they acquired the Modern Library imprint from publisher Horace Liveright, which reprints classic works of literature. Cerf is quoted as saying, "We just said we were going to publish a few books on the side at random", which suggested the name Random House.

In 1934, they published the first authorized edition of James Joyce's novel Ulysses in the Anglophone world. Ulysses transformed Random House into a formidable publisher over the next two decades. In 1936, it acquired Smith and Haas, and Robert Haas became the third partner until retiring and selling his share back to Cerf and Klopfer in 1956. The acquisition of Smith and Haas added authors, including William Faulkner, Isak Dinesen, André Malraux, Robert Graves, and Jean de Brunhoff, who wrote the Babar children's books.

Random House also hired editors Harry Maule, Robert Linscott, and Saxe Commins, and they brought authors such as Sinclair Lewis and Robert Penn Warren with them. Random House entered reference publishing in 1947 with the American College Dictionary, which was followed in 1966 by its first unabridged dictionary.

In October 1959, Random House went public at $11.25 a share. This was a factor in decisions by other publishing companies, including Simon & Schuster, to later go public. American publishers Alfred A. Knopf, Inc. and Beginner Books were acquired by Random House in 1960, followed by Pantheon Books in 1961; works continue to be published under these imprints with editorial independence, such as Everyman's Library, a series of classical literature reprints.

In 1965, RCA bought Random House as part of a diversification strategy. Random House acquired the paperback book publisher Ballantine Books in 1973. RCA sold Random House to Advance Publications in 1980. Random House began publishing audiobooks in 1985.

In 1988, Random House acquired Crown Publishing Group. Also in 1988, McGraw-Hill acquired Random House's Schools and Colleges division.

In 1998, Bertelsmann AG bought Random House and merged it with Bantam Doubleday Dell and it soon went global. In 1999, Random House acquired the children's audiobook publisher Listening Library, and sold its distribution division.

=== 21st century ===
In 2001, Phyllis E. Grann joined Random House as vice chairman. Grann was the CEO for Putnam and had grown that house from $10 million in revenue in 1976, to more than $200 million by 1993 and without increasing their title output. A publishing insider commented, "I think maybe instead of buying a company [Random House CEO Peter Olson] bought a person."

In 2003, Random House reentered the distribution business. During the 2008 financial crisis, the publishing industry was hit hard with weak retail sales.

In May 2008, Random House CEO Peter Olson stepped down and was replaced by Markus Dohle.

In October 2008, Doubleday, a division of Random House, announced that they would lay off 16 people, representing approximately 10% of its workforce.

In early December 2008, which became known as Black Wednesday in publishing circles, many publishers including Random House took steps by restructuring their divisions and laying off employees.

The reorganization consolidated and created three divisions, including Random House Publishing Group, Knopf Doubleday Publishing Group, and Crown Publishing Group.

Susan Kamil was named editorial director for Dial Press and editor-in-chief of Random House imprints reporting to Gina Centrello, the president and publisher of the Random House Publishing Group. There were layoffs at Doubleday, now part of Knopf Publishing Group, and Dial Press, Bantam Dell. Spiegel & Grau was moved from Doubleday over to Random House. Random House also has an entertainment production arm for film and television, Random House Studio; which released the film, One Day in 2011. The company also creates story content for media including video games, social networks on the web, and mobile platforms.

Random House is one of the largest English language publishers, and part of a group of publishers once known as the "Big 6" and now known as the "Big Five". In October 2012, Bertelsmann entered into talks with rival conglomerate Pearson plc, over the possibility of combining their respective publishing companies, Random House and Penguin Group.

On July 1, 2013, the merger was completed, and the new company emerged as Penguin Random House. When founded, Bertelsmann owned 53% of the joint venture while Pearson owned 47%.

Pearson sold 22% of its shares to Bertelsmann in July 2017, and since April 2020, it is a wholly owned subsidiary of Bertelsmann, making Random House division again wholly owned by German parent. At the time of the acquisition the combined companies controlled 25% of the book business with more than 10,000 employees and 250 independent publishing imprints and with about $3.9 billion in annual revenues. The move to consolidate was to provide leverage against Amazon.com and battle the shrinking state of bookstores.

In October 2018, Penguin Random House merged two of its most known publishing lines, Random House and the Crown Publishing Group. According to Madeline McIntosh, chief executive of Penguin Random House U.S., the two lines "will retain their distinct editorial identities." McIntosh explained some of the motivation behind the merger in a memo to employees, writing, "Book discovery and buying patterns continue to shift, resulting in growth opportunities in the nonfiction categories in which Crown in particular already has a strong foothold: food, lifestyle, health, wellness, business, and Christian." "We must invest even more aggressively in title-level and scaled marketing programs, capabilities and partnerships", she added.

In 2019, Penguin Random House acquired British children's book publisher Little Tiger Group, including Tiger Tales Press, a U.S. subsidiary, and added it to Random House Children's Books. Penguin Random House announced an agreement to purchase Boom! Studios in July 2024, where Boom! would become part of Random House Worlds.

== Organization ==
=== Headquarters ===
The publisher's main office in the United States is located in Penguin Random House Tower, which was constructed in 2009 at 1745 Broadway in Manhattan. The 684-foot (210 m) building spans the west side of the block between West 55th and West 56th Streets. The building's lobby showcases floor-to-ceiling glassed-in bookcases, which are filled with books published by the company and its subsidiaries.

Prior to moving to Penguin Random House Tower, the company was headquartered at 457 Madison Avenue, 20 East 57th Street, and 201 East 50th Street, all in Manhattan.

=== International branches ===
Random House, Inc. maintains several independently managed subsidiaries around the world.

The Random House Group is one of the largest general book publishing companies in the United Kingdom; it is based in London.

The group comprises nine publishing companies: Cornerstone Publishing, Vintage Publishing, Ebury Publishing, Transworld Publishers, Penguin Random House Children's, Penguin Random House UK Audio, Penguin Michael Joseph, Penguin Press, and Penguin General. Its distribution business services its own imprints, as well as 40 other UK publishers through Grantham Book Services.

The Random House archive and library is located in Rushden in Northamptonshire.

In 1989, Century Hutchinson was folded into the British Random House Group, briefly known as Random Century (1990–92), Century became an imprint of the group's Cornerstone Publishing.

The Random House Group also operates branches in Australia, New Zealand, South Africa (as a joint venture under the name Random House Struik), and India as part of its overseas structure. In Australia offices are in Sydney and Melbourne. In New Zealand it is based in Glenfield, Auckland, while Random House's Indian headquarters are located in New Delhi.

Verlagsgruppe Random House was established after Bertelsmann's 1998 acquisition of Random House, grouping its German imprints (until then operating as Verlagsgruppe Bertelsmann) under the new name; before April 2020, it has explicitly no legal part of the worldwide Penguin Random House company and a hundred percent subsidiary of Bertelsmann instead but de facto is led by the same management. It is the second largest book publisher in Germany with more than 40 imprints, including historic publishing houses Goldmann and Heyne Verlag, as well as C. Bertelsmann, the publishing house from which today's Bertelsmann SE & Co. KGaA would eventually evolve. Verlagsgruppe Random House is headquartered in Munich (with additional locations in Gütersloh (where Bertelsmann is headquartered), Cologne, and Aßlar), employs about 850 people, and publishes roughly 2,500 titles per year. Following the formation of Penguin Random House, a Penguin Verlag (with no legal connection to Penguin Books) was founded for the German market in 2015, as part of the Verlagsgruppe Random House. With Bertelsmann acquiring full ownership of Penguin Random House in April 2020, Verlagsgruppe Random House is being reintegrated with the main Penguin Random House company and now known as Penguin Random House Verlagsgruppe.

Penguin Random House Grupo Editorial is Random House's Spanish-language division, targeting markets in Spain and Hispanic America. It is headquartered in Barcelona with locations in Argentina, Chile, Colombia, Mexico, Venezuela, Uruguay, and the United States. From 2001 until November 2012, it was a joint venture with Italian publisher Mondadori (Random House Mondadori). Upon Bertelsmann's acquisition of Mondadori's stake in the JV, the name was kept temporarily four months. Some Spanish-language authors published by Penguin Random House Grupo Editorial include Roberto Bolaño, Javier Marías, Mario Vargas Llosa and Guillermo Arriaga.

Random House of Canada was established in 1944 as the company's local distributor in that country. In 1986, it established its own Canadian publishing program that has become one of the most successful in Canadian history. Until January 2012, it held a 25% stake in McClelland & Stewart, with the remaining 75% held by the University of Toronto. It is now the sole owner of McClelland & Stewart.

Takeda Random House Japan was founded in May 2003 as a joint venture between Kodansha and Random House. Eventually, it filed for bankruptcy on December 14, 2012.

In 2006, Random House Korea was founded. In 2010, Random House divested their ownership of this branch.

In April 2010, Random House Australia managing director, Margie Seale, was assigned the responsibilities of exploring and evaluating potential business opportunities for the company in Asia.

== Random House Home Video ==
Random House Home Video
- Type: Division
- Industry: Home video
- Founded: 1984; 42 years ago
- Defunct: 2007; 19 years ago
- Fate: Dormant
- Headquarters: New York City
- Area served: Worldwide
- Products: Sesame Street (1986-1995); The Berenstain Bears First Time Video (1988-1998); Arthur (1997-2007)

Random House Home Video was a home video division of Random House established in 1984. It released products from well-known properties such as Sesame Street and The Berenstain Bears, as well as direct-to-video series such as Richard Scarry's Best Videos Ever! and Beginner Book Video.

By December 1994, it secured exclusive home video rights to the then-upcoming Arthur television series.

In the beginning of April 1995, it reached an agreement with Sony Wonder, in which the latter became the former's main sales and distribution agent. By the following month, Sony Wonder became the exclusive music and home video licensee for Sesame Street. At the time, Random House's agreement for Sesame Street home video products was scheduled to expire on December 31, 1995.

By the middle of November 1999, the agreement between this label and Sony Wonder was expanded, in which the latter took over the main marketing responsibilities for the former.

== See also ==
- List of English language book publishers
- List of largest book publishers of the United Kingdom
- Mass media in New York City
- Western Publishing
