= Blanche Noyes =

American aviator

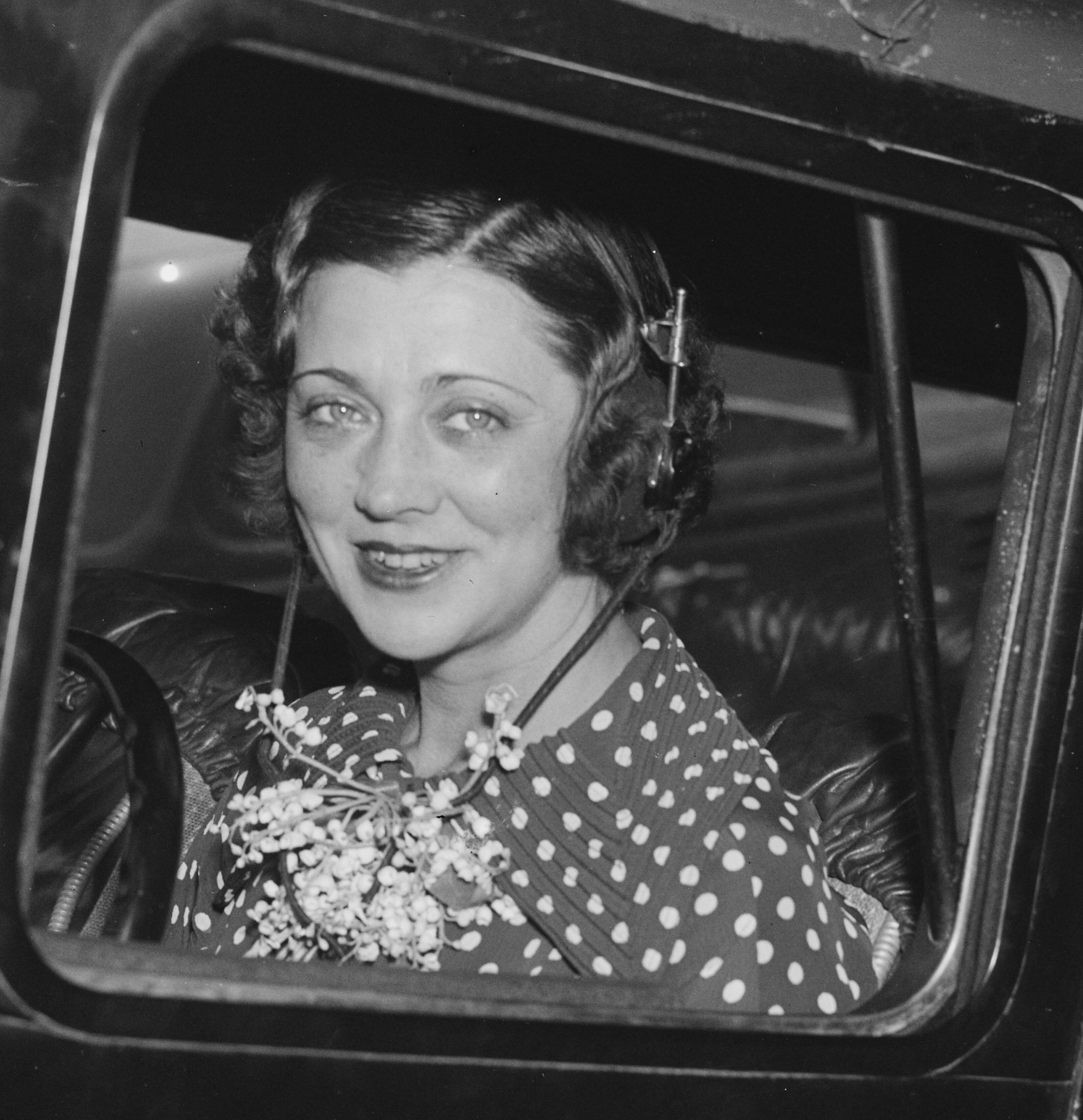
- Blanche W. Noyes in 1930
- Born: June 23, 1900; Cleveland, Ohio, U.S.
- Died: October 6, 1981 (aged 81); Washington, D.C., U.S.
- Occupation: Aviator
- Spouse: Dewey Noyes (c. 1900 – 1935)

Blanche Noyes (June 23, 1900 – October 6, 1981) was an American pioneering female aviator who was among the first ten women to receive a transport pilot's license. In 1929, she became Ohio's first licensed female pilot.

== Biography ==
She was born Blanche Wilcox on June 23, 1900, in Cleveland, Ohio. She gave up her acting career after marrying pilot Dewey L. Noyes (c. 1900 – 1935) in 1928.

She started flying in 1929 after getting a lesson from her husband. She soloed on February 15 after four hours of training and received her pilot's license in June of the same year.

Noyes entered the inaugural Women's Air Derby in August 1929, one of twenty competitors attempting to fly from Santa Monica, California to Cleveland. Along the way, she "narrowly escaped death when her plane caught fire in mid-air near Pecos." She set down so hard her landing gear was damaged. She put out the fire, made repairs and resumed the race. She placed fourth in the heavy class.

She was a demonstration pilot for Standard Oil in 1931 and flew with various organizations. On 11 December 1935, her husband and his passenger died when his airplane crashed in dense fog and a snowstorm.

In 1936, she teamed up as co-pilot to Louise Thaden (a fellow 1929 Women's Air Derby competitor) and won the Bendix Trophy Race in the first year women were allowed to compete against men. They set a new world record of 14 hours, 55 minutes, flying from New York City to Los Angeles in a Beech C17R Staggerwing biplane. Laura Ingalls came in second by 45 minutes flying a Lockheed Orion.

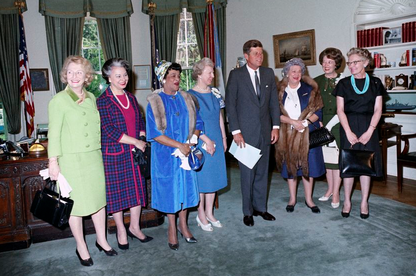
President John F. Kennedy with 1963 Federal Woman's Award winners, including Noyes (to the immediate right of Kennedy)

While living in Irvington, New Jersey, Noyes became a member of the Women's Advisory Committee on Aeronautics. In August 1936, she was among a handful of leading aviatrices to join the Air Marking Group of the Bureau of Air Commerce, funded by the Works Progress Administration. The group's objective was to aid aerial navigation by writing the name of the nearest town at 15-mile (24 km) intervals, on the roofs of prominent buildings if possible, on the ground in white paint when not. With America's entry into World War II in December 1941, however, for security reasons the Noyes team had to black out the roughly 13,000 sites they had marked. After the war, as head of the air marking division of the Civil Aeronautics Administration, she oversaw their restoration and added further navigational aids. According to the National Air and Space Museum, "For many years, she was the only woman pilot allowed to fly a government aircraft."

She also wrote numerous newspaper and magazine articles.

She died on October 6, 1981, in Washington, D.C.

== Legacy ==
She was the first woman awarded a gold medal by the Commerce Department, for 35 years of government service in improving air safety.

In 2021, an opera memorializing her run in the 1936 Bendix Trophy Race titled Staggerwing was premiered at the Kansas Aviation Museum. Composed by Lisa DeSpain with librettist Rachel J. Peters, Staggerwing was the winner of the 2020 biennial Zepick Modern Opera Competition.
