= Cecil W. Stoughton =

American photographer (1920–2008)

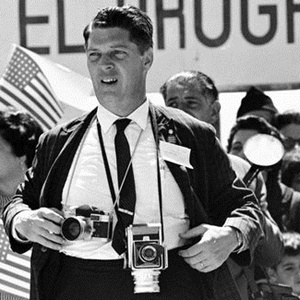
- Stoughton during the presidency of John F. Kennedy.

Chief Official White House Photographer
- In office 1961–1963
- President: John F. Kennedy; Lyndon B. Johnson
- Preceded by: Position established
- Succeeded by: Yoichi Okamoto

Personal details
- Born: Cecil William Stoughton; January 18, 1920 Oskaloosa, Iowa U.S.
- Died: November 3, 2008 (aged 88) Merritt Island, Florida, U.S.
- Occupation: Photographer

Cecil William Stoughton (January 18, 1920 – November 3, 2008) was an American photographer. He is best known for being President John F. Kennedy's photographer during his White House years. Stoughton was present at the motorcade at which Kennedy was assassinated and subsequently took the only photographs on board Air Force One of Lyndon B. Johnson being sworn in as the next President.

== Life and work ==
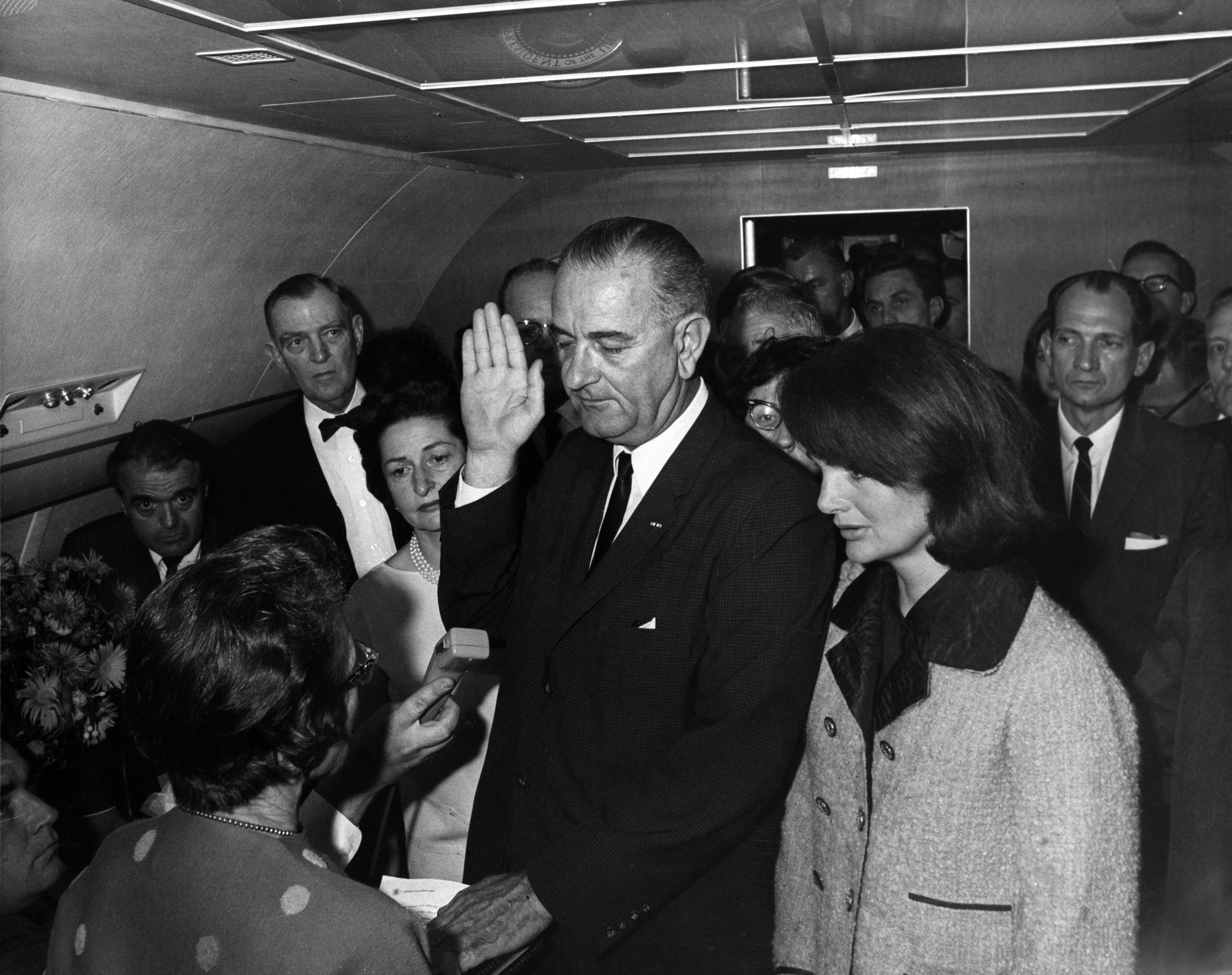
Stoughton's iconic photograph of Lyndon B. Johnson taking the oath of office as President following the assassination of John F. Kennedy.

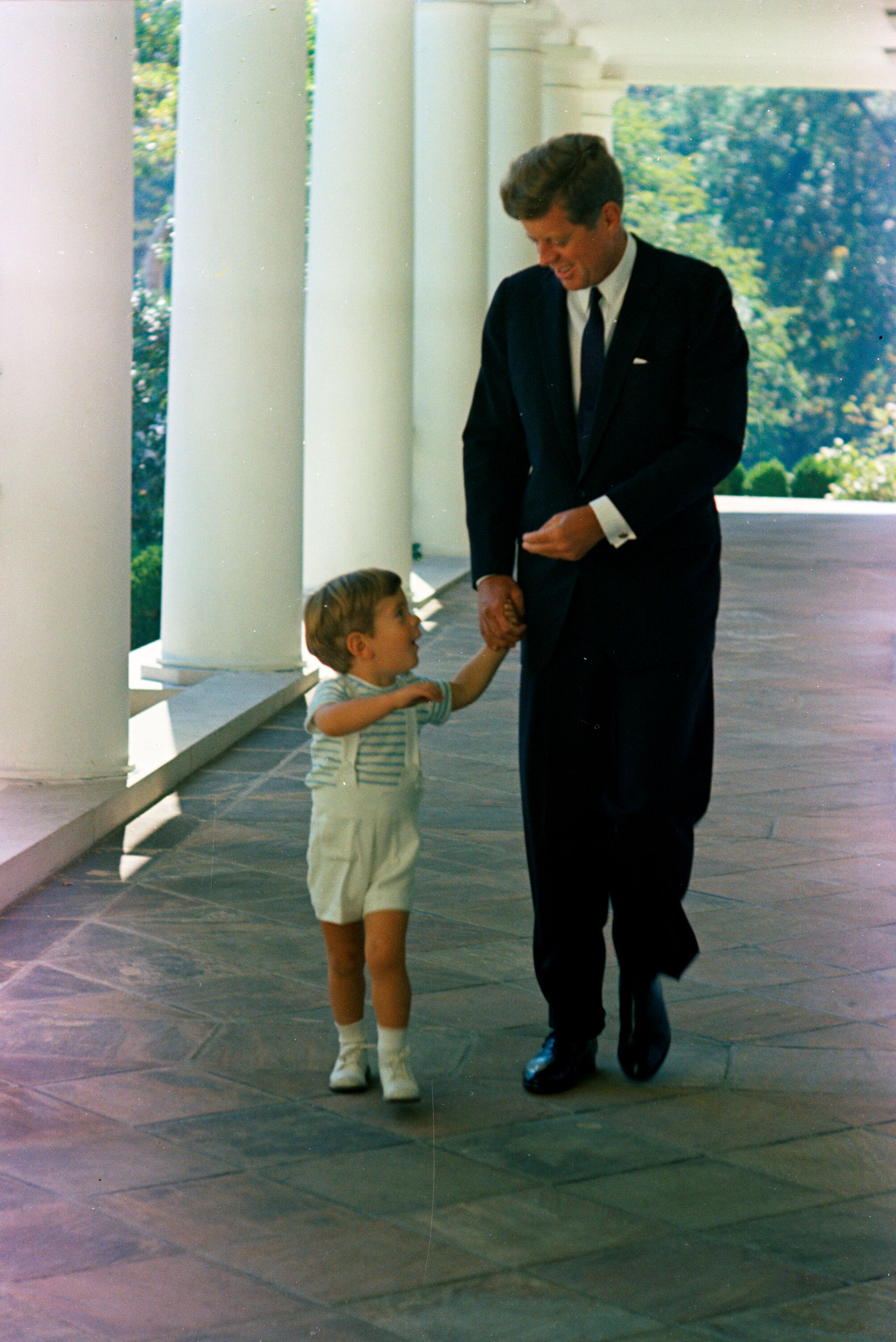
President John F. Kennedy with John-John in 1963.

Stoughton was born in Oskaloosa, Iowa, on January 18, 1920.

During World War II, he was assigned to the First Motion Picture Unit. He was a captain in the United States Army Signal Corps, when he was assigned to the White House Army Signal Agency. Stoughton's behind-the-scene pictures of John and Jacqueline and their children in their public and personal life were pivotal in shaping the public's view of the U.S. first family. He took more than 8,000 pictures of the family spanning the 34-month period beginning with Kennedy's inauguration and ending with his assassination.

Stoughton took the only photograph ever published showing John F. Kennedy, Bobby Kennedy and Marilyn Monroe together. Stoughton was present at the motorcade at which Kennedy was assassinated, and was subsequently the only photographer on board Air Force One when Lyndon B. Johnson was sworn in as the next President. Stoughton knew it was "tasteless," but suggested a photograph needed to be made of the "history-making moment ... and I think we should have it." Kenneth T. Walsh even agreed and said of Stoughton's picture that Air Force One "has become associated with incredibly powerful images" and "a symbol of the country and a reminder of history." His photograph, the most famous ever taken aboard a presidential aircraft, depicts Johnson raising his hand in oath as he stood between his wife Lady Bird Johnson and a still blood-spattered Jacqueline Kennedy. Stoughton recounted this event and his service as White House photographer during Johnson's first two years in office in an oral history contributed to the Lyndon Baines Johnson Library and Museum.

From 1967–1973, Stoughton served as the chief still photographer of the National Park Service.

Stoughton appeared as a contestant on the May 29, 1987, episode of the game show Classic Concentration, on the date that Kennedy would have turned 70 years old.

In 2007, Stoughton appeared on the television series Antiques Roadshow as part of the LBJ Centennial where he recounted his story and presented prints of his photographs from his personal collection, including a print of his photograph of Johnson being sworn in that Johnson had signed, a print of his 1962 photograph of the Kennedy family signed by both Jacqueline and John F. Kennedy, and a photograph of Johnson in the Oval Office as he signed the photo of his swearing in. All the items together appraised for $75,000. Two years after his death a large collection of his photographs was sold at auction. It included the picture of Johnson's inauguration, and fetched $151,000.

He died in Merritt Island, Florida, and was buried at Arlington National Cemetery.
