= September Morn (disambiguation) =

September Morn is a controversial oil painting by the French artist Paul Émile Chabas.

September Morn may also refer to:

- September Morn (album), a 1979 album by Neil Diamond, or the title song
- September Morn (film), a 1914 film by Pathé inspired by the painting
