= Lincoln Arcade =

Commercial building in New York City (1903–60)

- Interactive map of the Lincoln Arcade area
- Former names: Lincoln Arcade, Lincoln Square Arcade

General information
- Type: Commercial building
- Location: Manhattan, New York City, United States
- Coordinates: 40.7738°N 73.9828°W
- Opened: 1903
- Destroyed: 1960

Technical details
- Floor count: 6
- Lifts/elevators: 2

Design and construction
- Architect: Julius Munckwitz (1902)

The Lincoln Arcade was a commercial building near Lincoln Square on the Upper West Side of Manhattan, New York City, just west of Central Park. Built in 1903, it was viewed by contemporaries as a sign of the northward extension of business-oriented real estate ventures, and the shops, offices, and other enterprises.

Soon after it opened, however, the building was becoming known for some considerably less conventional residents. One observer styled some of these newcomers as "starving students, musicians, actors, dead-beat journalists, nondescript authors, tarts, polite swindlers, and fugitives from injustice." Many others were aspiring artists. Most of these men and women received little attention from the public either during their lives or since their deaths, but some, such as George Bellows, Thomas Hart Benton, Stuart Davis, Marcel Duchamp, Eugene O'Neill, and Lionel Barrymore, became famous. The Lincoln Arcade was destroyed in 1960.

== History of the site ==
In the late 1700s the western part of Manhattan where the building would be constructed was known as Bloemendaal or Blooming Dale, the valley of flowers, where could be found large farms. In the early 1800s the city expanded its street network north to the district and the farms that originally dominated the area were broken up into lots that were held as investments. Through inheritance, the location where the Lincoln Arcade would later be built was transferred from the original farm owner, John Somerindyke, to the widow of one of his sons, Abigail Thorn, in 1809. Subsequent owners were John H. Talman, John G. Gottsberger, and Thomas S. Cargill. The three were businessmen who held the property along with other real estate investments.

In 1889 the city required each block in that grid to be given a number for administrative purposes. The block number for the location where the Lincoln Arcade would be erected is shown as 1137 in the Manhattan Atlas of 1891 and the block retains that number to this day.

In 1819-20 commissioners named by the state government laid out the street grid for streets, avenues, and the blocks they created. An atlas published in 1868 shows the farms of 1815 overlaid by the 1819-20 grid and atlases published subsequently show the gradual expansion of building construction northward from downtown Manhattan. An 1879 atlas shows lots laid out in the location where the Lincoln Arcade would be built but no buildings put up on them. The atlas published in 1891 shows structures in five of the eight lots in the eventual Lincoln Arcade location. Three had two stories, the other two had one, and they were made of brick. In both editions of the Atlas, John G. Gottsberger is shown as the landowner. Atlases published in 1892 and 1897 show no change but give some detail: At the corner of West 65th Street and Broadway (then called the Boulevard) there were two one-story buildings, one a warehouse, and one two-story commercial building. Near the corner of West 66th Street and the Boulevard there was another two-story warehouse, a coal yard, and, outside the area where the Lincoln Arcade would be erected, a five-story commercial building.

In the late 1890s the land and its few structures became increasingly valuable as investors sought property near what had by then become a transportation hub. Real estate brokers bought and sold buildings and lots in the location of the future Lincoln Arcade and in 1900 a man named John L. Miller began to assemble the holdings on which he would construct that building.

After purchasing some of the property he filed plans to build a four-story brick commercial building on the site. He did not follow through on those plans and instead purchased adjoining lots until he owned nearly the entire block front on Broadway and much of the block at 65th Street near Broadway.

== Construction and early years ==
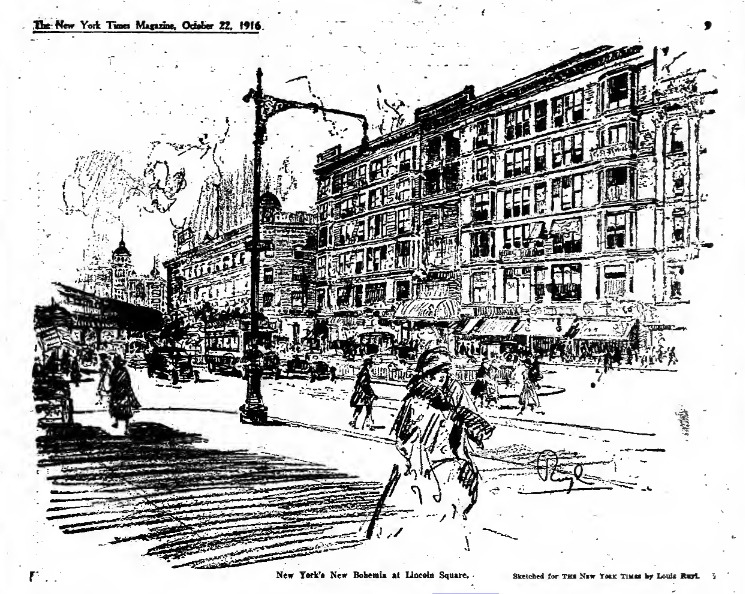
Sketch of the Lincoln Arcade Building, New York Times, October 22, 1916, by Louis Ruyl.

With the property in hand, Miller filed plans to construct what he called the Broadway Arcade. The plans described two buildings of offices and stores situated side-by-side, facing Broadway. The architect was Julius Munckwitz and the expected cost was $215,000. As construction neared completion, a news piece cited it as the keystone of developers' hopes for business-oriented real estate in the vicinity (an area they were now calling "Empire Square"). The article quoted Miller as saying, "I am proving what I think of Empire Square by putting $300,000 in it. We expect to have the Arcade ready by May 1 and already we have rented half the space. I am more than gratified at the outlook. If things pan out as I expect them to, I intend to erect a theatre in the rear of the Broadway Arcade on a plot of six lots I own." An atlas published in 1907 gives a fire insurance perspective on the Arcade. It shows the two buildings, each having six stories, joined by the one-story arcade. Above the arcade, the two structures are connected by a stack of enclosed bridges. At the back of the arcade there is a pair of elevators. In 1916 the New York Times published a sketch of this composite building. Depicting it as it appeared when new, the sketch shows the pair of buildings and between them an un-roofed alley.

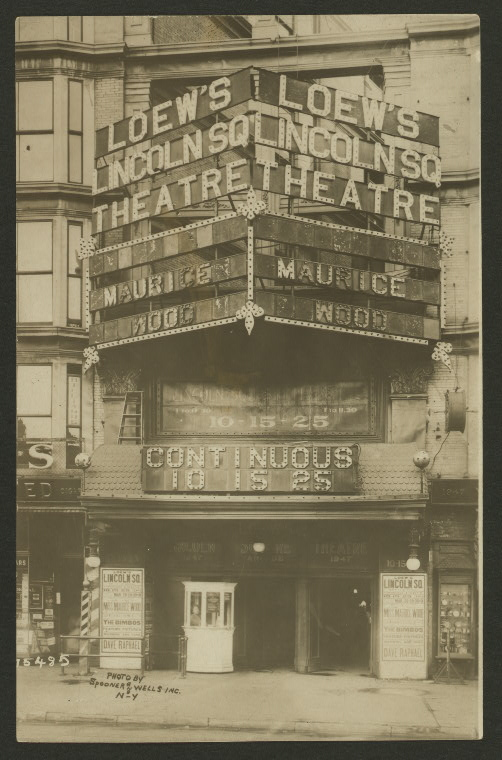
Marquee of Loew's Lincoln Square Theatre taken in 1912 by Spooner & Wells

Although first called the Broadway Arcade, the building soon came to be known as the Lincoln Square Arcade (after the square of that name located across Broadway from it), and then simply Lincoln Arcade. In 1904 Miller formed the Empire Square Realty Company with himself as president and his children as officers and directors. He then placed the Arcade and other holdings in the hands of the new corporation. Miller added a theater to the property the following year. He placed it on 68th Street behind the southernmost of the two Arcade structures and patrons gained access from Broadway via the arcade. It was at first leased by Sam S. and Lee Shubert and called the Lincoln Square Theatre. On May 2, 1907, Charles E. Blaney acquired a 10-year lease from Empire Square Realty, and renamed the theater Blaney's Lincoln Square Theater. Marcus Loew took it over a few years later, rebranded it as Loew's Lincoln Square Theater or simply Loew's Lincoln Square, and used it for both vaudeville and movie shows. In performance at the time it was taken were vaudeville acts, mostly song and dance teams, along with impersonators, comedians, and an acrobatic duo called The Bimbos.

By 1918, what was then called the "Lincoln Square District" was said to be unusually profitable for real estate investors, appearing to possess "the qualities for greater building achievements in the years rapidly approaching than those just forgotten."

Miller sought to fill the Arcade with tenants by placing small ads in the local press and in journals such as the Real Estate Record and Builders' Guide. These emphasized "business purposes" such as "stores, studies, offices." They also usually mentioned studios and offered to divide floor space to suit. One mentioned clubrooms. One drew attention to the building's "Most Remarkable Location" with its "Car line and subway and 'L' stations exceeding any point in the city" where could be found "studios, offices and floors, $15 to $100 [with] elevators, steam heat, gas, electricity, baths."

In October 1916 the New York Times published an extract of a novel by an Arcade resident, Owen Johnson, saying, "Mr. Johnson declares that everything he says about this new Bohemia is true, and open to investigation, and that the characters are taken from real life." In the novel, Johnson wrote that the Arcade stood, "at that intersection of Broadway and Columbus Avenue, where the grumbling subway and the roaring elevated meet at Lincoln Square." He continued, "It covered a block, bisected by an arcade and rising six capacious stories in the form of an enormous H. On Broadway, the glass front was given over to shops and offices of all descriptions, while in the back stretches of the top stories, artists, sculptors, students, and illustrators had their studios alongside of mediums, dentists, curious business offices, and derelicts of all description." Of the neighborhood, he wrote: "The square was a churning meeting of contending human tides. The Italians had installed their fruit shops and their groceries; the French their florists and their delicatessen shops; the Jews their clothing bazaars; the Germans their jewelers and their shoe stores; the Irish their saloons and their restaurants, while from Healy's, one of the most remarkable meeting-grounds in the city, they dominated the neighborhood." (Johnson's "Healy's" was the saloon called Sharkey's which is shown in a famous painting by George Bellows called "Stag at Sharkey's" of 1909.)

Among street-level tenants during the building's early years were a candy store, a barber, a clock maker, a milliner's shop, a billiard parlor, and two corner saloons. Downstairs was a bowling alley and theater. One of the building's lecture halls hosted a "spiritualistic" enterprise, the First Liberal Thought Church. The upper floors contained stenographers, dance instructors, lawyers, dentists, health faddists, fortune tellers, a school of Jiu-Jitsu, and detective agencies.

Although it listed studios, along with offices and stores, as a feature of the building, management did not market the Arcade to artists and other creative arts individuals. It nonetheless attracted many of them. During its early years, in addition to its many artists, it contained the opera star Rosa Ponselle; the puppeteers Sue Hastings, Edwin Deaves and Garrett Becker; the movie director Rex Ingram; and writers such as William Huntington Wright (S. S. Van Dine) and Thomas Craven.

An Australian-born poet, Louis Esson, was one of the first to label this melange a Bohemia. In 1916, he wrote a friend to say, "We have deserted Greenwich Village and the haunts of the Bohemians and have landed near the centre of Broadway (between 65th and 66th streets). As a matter of fact, our present abode is much more Bohemian than Washington Square; at least it is New York's Bohemia. We have a big room in the Lincoln Square Arcade, with steam-heat, electric light, piano, bath, ice-box, elevator, etc." In October of that year, an article in the New York Times contrasted the downtown Bohemia in Greenwich Village with an unexpected Bohemia uptown that was both new and "perhaps more democratic."

Craven, who was an aspiring artist before he established himself as an art critic, considered the building to be the center of metropolitan Bohemian life. He wrote, "The Arcade housed an unsavory crew: commercial artists, illustrators, starving students, musicians, actors, dead-beat journalists, nondescript authors, tarts, polite swindlers, and fugitives from injustice." In his life of John Sloan, Van Wyck Brooks said the building was a "rookery of half-fed students, astrologers, prostitutes, actors, models, prize-fighters, quacks and dancers."

== Artists and illustrators ==
With their large skylights, the top-floor studios attracted artists and illustrators who were able to afford their higher rents. On the other hand, the cheaper studios on the lower floors could often serve, although with mixed success, as both studios and living quarters. The building's relatively prosperous artists and illustrators included Howard Chandler Christy, known for his "Christy Girls"; Dwight Franklin, who built dioramas for the American Museum of Natural History; Charles Henry Niehaus, whose equestrian monuments can be found in many American cities; Bernhardt Wall, an illustrator who became known as the "Postcard King"; and Wilhelm Heinrich Detlev Körner, a prolific illustrator whose painting A Charge to Keep was hung in the Oval Office when George W. Bush was president. Of the aspiring artists who tended to occupy the lower floors there were some who failed to gain much recognition during their lives. Women predominated in this group, among them Helyn Knowlton, Molly Wheeler, Charlotta Baxter, and Estelle Orteig. Others, mostly men, fared better in the art world: Robert Henri, George Bellows, Milton Avery, Marcel Duchamp, Thomas Hart Benton, Stuart Davis, Alexander Archipenko, and Raphael Soyer to name a few. One of the more successful tenants later recalled that the building had the reputation of being a good luck spot for budding artists, adding that "many of the great ones had started up the ladder there."

In the years between its opening and 1910, F. Graham Cootes, George Bellows, Ted Ireland, Ed Keefe, and Robert Henri took up tenancies. In those years Eugene O'Neill roomed with Bellows and set scenes from his 1914 play, "Bread and Butter" there. O'Neill's stage directions describe an artist's studio on the top floor at the front of the building. There is a large bay window overlooking the avenue before which is a comfortable window-seat. The disheveled room is full of unmatched furniture, book cases, a piano, an easel, and many paintings. There is a kitchenette in one corner, partly concealed by a burlap-covered partition, and a small hallway leads to the entrance door. In addition, "There is a large skylight in the middle of the ceiling which sheds the glow from the lights of the city down in a sort of faint half-light."

Artists who arrived between 1911 and 1915 included Glenn Coleman, Henry Glittenkamp, Stuart Davis, Thomas Hart Benton, Raeburn Van Buren, Ralph Barton, and Neysa McMein. Barton shared his room with the actor William Powell, and later with Benton and Van Buren. Marcel Duchamp and Jean Crotti arrived in 1915. In 1916 a group of artists met in the studio rented by A. S. Baylinson to form an organization they called the Society of Independent Artists. The studio became headquarters for the society with Baylinson as secretary. William Glackens was president during its early years, followed by Sloan. Tenants during the 1920s and until the building was demolished included Morris Kantor, Raphael Soyer, Reginald Marsh, Milton Avery, and Alexander Archipenko. Early in the 1920s the actors Alfred Lunt and Leslie Howard took drawing lessons from the portraitist, Clinton Peters, in one of the sixth-floor studios; at about the same time, John Barrymore rented a studio to try his hand as an artist.

== Later years ==
When John L. Miller Sr. died in 1920, John L. Miller Jr. replaced him as head of Empire Square Realty. In 1931, during some of the worst months of the Great Depression, John L. Miller Jr. obtained additional mortgage financing for the Arcade and the additional debt brought his total exposure to $1,250,000. He obtained another loan in 1933, and later in the same year he created a new company which he used to lease the building back to himself for a nominal rent. The maneuver clearly failed, for in 1934 he made an unsuccessful attempt to sell the property.

News photo of the Lincoln Arcade after it was partially destroyed by fire in February 1931

The ravages of the Depression were not his only problems during those years. In February and again in November 1931 the building caught fire leaving parts of it near collapse. A photo taken at the time shows the extent of damage to the front of the building. Some artists, including A. S. Baylinson and Helen Sardeau, lost all or most of the works they held there. Sardeau received notice for her pluck in subsequently showing a few pieces she had been able to save in a local exhibition.

The building was quickly rebuilt, but when its tenants had returned the city accused Miller of permitting them to live as well as work in a building that was not registered as a residential structure. Miller contested the accusation but failed to prove his case; as a result many people were evicted. In 1934 Miller's mortgage holder, City Bank of New York, foreclosed the property; failing to find a buyer, the bank hired a service company to manage it.

Photo of the Lincoln Arcade building taken in 1939 under auspices of the Works Progress Administration and the New York City Department of Taxation

A 1939 tax photo shows the building as it appeared following reconstruction. It differed little from its original design, consisting still of two structures that were joined by bridges above a central arcade. In 1942 the bank was finally able to sell the building when an investment syndicate purchased the Arcade and eight adjoining buildings.

News photo of the Lincoln Arcade building taken in 1959 showing the marquee of Studio 60

In the early 1950s the CBS network took over the theater, renaming it Studio 60. Between 1950 and 1956 shows produced there included the Ernie Kovacs Tuesday night show, the Perry Como Chesterfield Show, the Sammy Kaye Show, and some quiz shows (Strike it Rich, Winner Take All, Break the Bank). A news photo of December 1959 shows no obvious differences in the building from ten years before.

Raphael Soyer, Farewell to Lincoln Square, 1959, oil and conte crayon on canvas, 60 x 55 inches

When, in the late 1940s, a slum-clearance initiative targeted the area around Lincoln Square, it was at first unclear whether the Arcade would be included in the scheme and it was not until 1958 that the decision was made to raze the building to make way for the new home of the Juilliard School. The following year all of the remaining tenants were evicted, the building was demolished, and construction began. Although the Arcade's Bohemian heyday was by then almost entirely a matter of history, still, looking back on these events, one writer lamented, "The bohemian exuberance that characterized Lincoln Square for so many years was virtually wiped clean in the early 1960s. The giant urban renewal effort that created Lincoln Center for the Performing Arts ironically replaced the popular, underground art scene with the legitimized high culture of musical arts from Europe and America. Although the area would be filled with musicians and artists drawn by the new complex, the economic revival would also force the earlier, more flamboyant group of artists to disperse."

In 1959 Raphael Soyer painted "Farewell to Lincoln Square" to commemorate the eviction of the Arcade's last tenant. He later said simply, "This is a picture of the dispossessed." It shows Soyer at back, waving to the viewer, his wife, Rebecca to his right, and, in front, two other Arcade tenants, a jewelry-maker whose name is not given, and Patty Mucha, a painter who was Claes Oldenburg's first wife.
