= September Morn (film) =

- Starring: Charles Arling; Caroline Rankin; Joseph Burke
- Production company: Pathé
- Release date: February 25, 1914 (United States)
- Running time: 2 reels
- Country: United States
- Language: Silent

September Morn was a two-reel silent comedy film produced by Pathé and released in 1914. Inspired by Paul Chabas' September Morn, it followed a young sailor who had a nude figure tattooed on his chest but was forced to tattoo clothes on the figure. This now-lost film was reviewed positively in The Moving Picture World.

== Plot ==
Dennis, a young sailor, is distraught over his lack of tattoos and envious of those which adorn his fellow sailors' skins. While on shore leave, he decides to visit a tattoo parlor and have his body inked. He initially rejects all the patterns shown to him, but is entranced by one which depicts a young nude woman standing in water. He has the figure tattooed onto his chest, then leaves the parlor.

Meanwhile, Dennis's girlfriend Genevieve, a leader in the Purity League, raids a shop which is depicting a nude, Paul Chabas' September Morn, in the window. Her attempt to have the work removed fails when the shop's owner knocks her out of the door by spraying her with a powerful hose. She returns home to find Dennis with his tattoo, which depicts the same maiden as the painting.

Enraged at Dennis' tattoo, Genevieve sends him back to the parlor to have the tattooed figure clothed. When Dennis has the nude clothed in a split skirt, Genevieve is incensed, and accompanies him back to the parlor. There, she forces Dennis to have the nude's torn skirt "sewn", and the remainder of her body completely clothed. Genevieve also has the words "Votes for Women" tattooed on Dennis' chest.

== Production ==
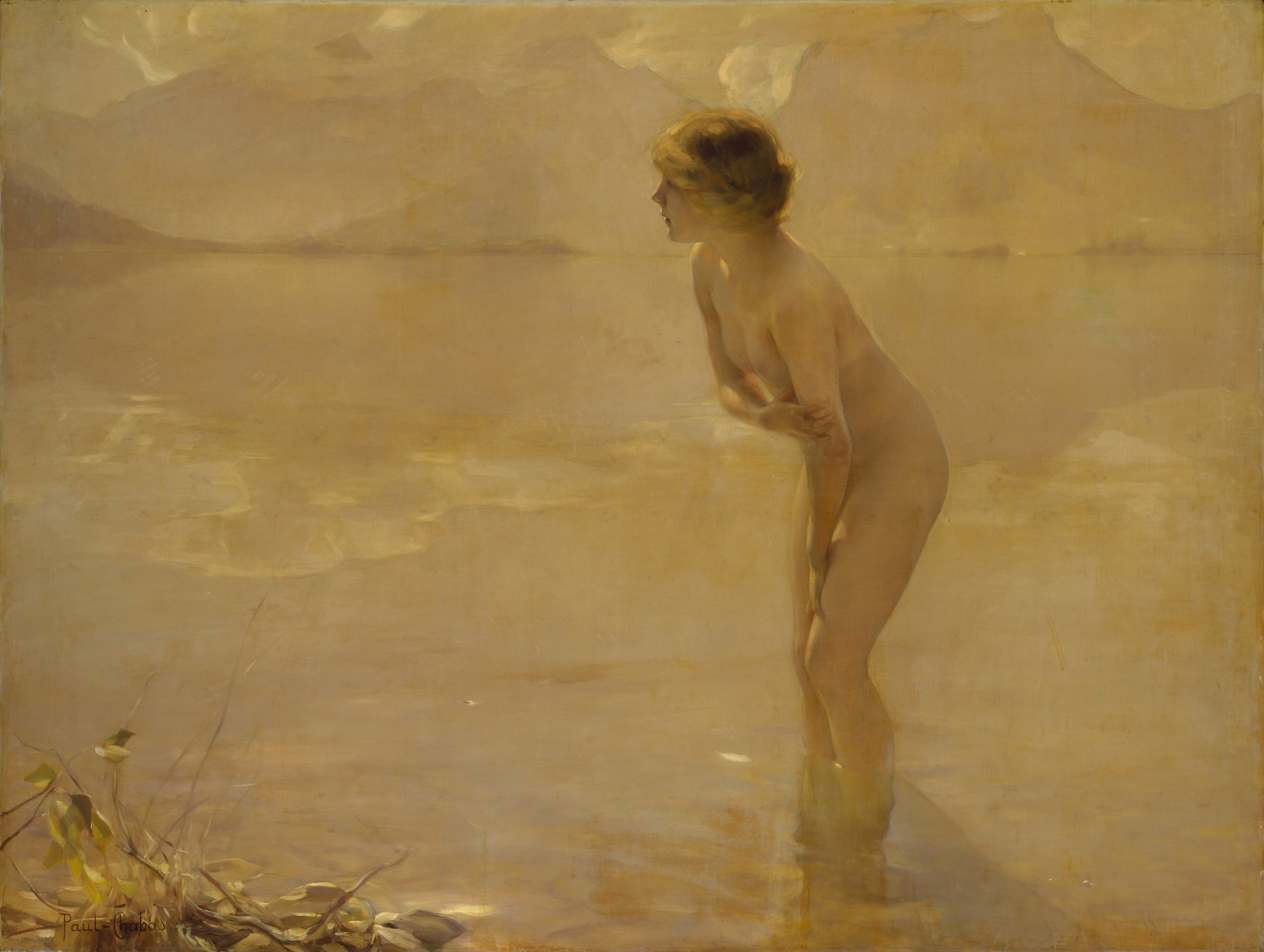
Chabas' September Morn; the film was released shortly after the painting became controversial.

This two-reel film was completed by Pathé. It starred Charles Arling, Caroline Rankin, and Joseph Burke.

The film's title was a reference to the painting September Morn by French artist Paul Chabas, which had been at the center of controversy in 1913. The painting, which depicted a young woman standing nude along a lake shore, had been displayed in a New York City shop when Anthony Comstock, head of the New York Society for the Suppression of Vice, saw it and ordered it to be removed. Though a clerk did so, the shop manager reinstated the work. This apparent act of censorship led to widespread polemics in the media, as well as a burgeoning industry of related products, including post cards, calendars, and songs. The nude figure from Chabas' painting formed the source of the young sailor's tattoo.

== Reception and analysis ==
September Morn was released on February 25, 1914. In the Chillicothe Morning Constitution, it was advertised as a "comedy that is different". A review in The Moving Picture World described the production as far-fetched and clearly exploitative of the titular painting, but original and amusing. The film was the first of two to be directly inspired by Chabas' painting. A second, September Mourning, was released in November 1915 by L-KO. It followed a pair of artists first vying for the attentions of a young woman in the park, then invading a school for girls.

September Morn is now believed lost. The film scholar Norman Taylor considers September Morn to serve the political purpose of ridiculing the purity and women's suffrage movements.
