= September Morn =

1911 painting by Paul Chabas

- Matinée de Septembre (French)
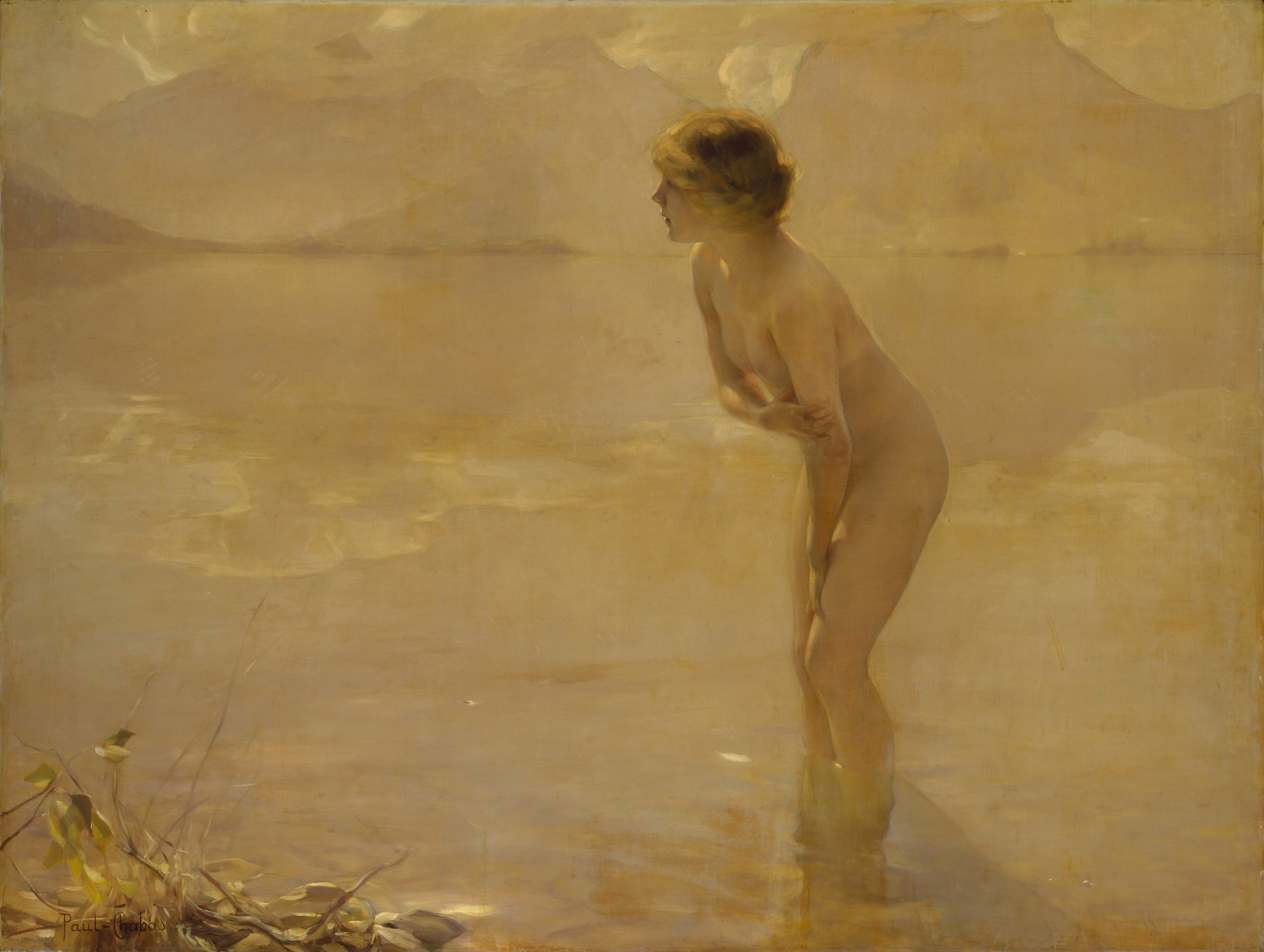
- Artist: Paul Émile Chabas
- Year: 1911
- Medium: Oil on canvas
- Dimensions: 163.8 cm × 216.5 cm (64.5 in × 85.2 in)
- Location: Metropolitan Museum of Art, New York City
- Accession: 57.89

Matinée de Septembre (English: September Morn) is an oil painting on canvas completed in 1911 by the French artist Paul Émile Chabas. Painted over several summers, it depicts a nude girl or young woman standing in the shallow water of a lake, prominently lit by the morning sun. She is leaning slightly forward in an ambiguous posture, which has been read variously as a straightforward portrayal of protecting her modesty, huddling against the cold, or sponge bathing. It has also been considered a disingenuous pose permitting the "fetishisation of innocence".

September Morn was first exhibited at the Paris Salon of 1912, and although the identity of its first owner is unclear, it is certain that Leon Mantashev acquired the painting by the end of 1913. It was taken to Russia, and in the aftermath of the October Revolution of 1917 was feared lost. It resurfaced in 1935 in the collection of Calouste Gulbenkian, and after his death in 1955 was sold to a Philadelphia broker, who donated it anonymously to the Metropolitan Museum of Art (the Met) in 1957. As of 2014 it is not on display.

From 1913 on, reproductions of the painting caused controversy in the United States. An art dealer in Chicago was charged with indecency and another in New York was targeted by anti-vice crusader Anthony Comstock, both after displaying September Morn. Over the next few years the work was reproduced in a variety of forms, including on pins and calendars, while censorship and art were debated in newspapers. Chabas' painting inspired songs, stage shows and films; eventually some 7 million reproductions were sold, though Chabas – who had not copyrighted September Morn – did not receive any royalties.

Although several women claimed to be the model for September Morn, Chabas never revealed her identity. He described the work as "all I know of painting", and responded positively to statements that it was his masterpiece. Later writers, however, have described the painting as kitsch, valuable only as a historic artifact.

== Description ==
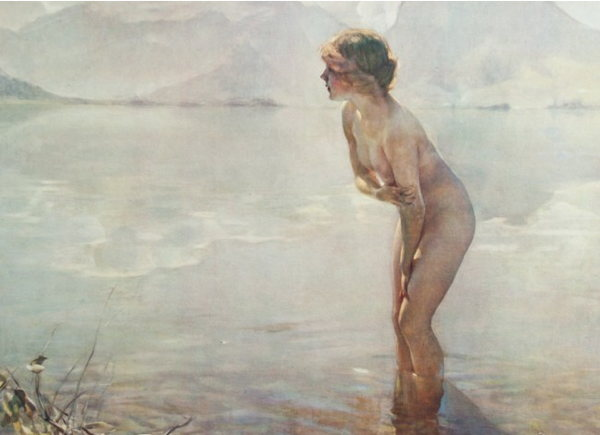
A 1961 reproduction of the painting, showing the dominance of grays

September Morn depicts, from an oblique point of view, a naked blonde girl or young woman standing ankle-deep in the water near the shoreline of a tranquil lake surrounded by hills. The figure is backlit by the morning sun, but fully visible, if a little darker than her surroundings. Her arms are folded about her body, her right arm passing below her breasts as she grasps her left elbow, while her left arm conceals her pubic area. (Note: The pose assumed by the model in September Morn is similar to the one taken by the model of Au crépuscule (At Twilight), a painting Chabas completed in c. 1905 (Musée d'Orsay, Au crépuscule), which was acquired by the Musée du Luxembourg in 1909 (Valmy-Baysse 1910, p. 10). A 1913 Milwaukee Sentinel article described the only difference being that the girl in Au crépuscule had long, straight hair, and that she clasped her right elbow with her left hand (The Milwaukee Sentinel 1913).) This pose has been variously interpreted as the subject protecting herself from the cold, covering her modesty, or sponge bathing, or as the artist's "fetishisation of innocence".

Reviews in 1912 noted that the painting was dominated by grays: those of her shaded body, the blue-grays of the September water, the green-grays of the sky, and the pink-grays of the hills behind her. The art critic François Thiébault-Sisson described this as evoking the morning, the young subject preparing to bathe while "light grey vapours are still floating over the lake". This oil painting on canvas measures 163.8 by 216.5 centimetres (64.5 by 85.2 in), and Chabas's signature is located in the lower left.

== Background ==
=== Chabas ===
The painter, Paul Émile Chabas, c. 1910

By the time he painted September Morn, Paul Émile Chabas already had an established reputation as an academic artist. He regularly submitted to the Paris Salon, first participating in 1886. He won a third class medal in the Salon of 1895, and four years later won the Prix National for his painting Joyeux ébats, which earned him a gold medal at the 1900 Exposition Universelle and was acquired by the Musée des Beaux-Arts de Nantes. In subsequent years Chabas spent the winters working in Paris, while he passed his summers painting young women along the shores of rivers, lakes, and seas. In 1902 he was made a Chevalier in the Legion of Honour. (Note: Chabas would later go on to head the Société des Artistes Français (Kingsport Times-News 1957).)

Chabas studied under artists such as Tony Robert-Fleury, William-Adolphe Bouguereau, and Albert Maignan. Although his earlier works were generally portraits, most of the painter's later production consisted of nude girls and young women. The lakes and rivers of France were common settings for his paintings, which gave prominence to the interaction of light with the models and their surroundings. September Morn is typical of his style.

J. Valmy-Baysse, in a 1910 overview of the artist, attributes Chabas's style to the painter's time at the family summer home along the Erdre; he identifies the "grace of adolescence, its undefinable charm, [and] its chaste nudity" of the models with Chabas's reminiscences of his youth. (Note: Original: "Toute la gracilité de l'adolescence, son charme indéfinissable, sa nudité chaste...") The art historian Bram Dijkstra has argued otherwise, stating that "no artist was more assiduous in exploiting the prurient possibilities of the woman-child" than Chabas, whom he considers to have "emphasized analogies of nude little girls and the familiar poses of vanity or physical arousal given to adult women".

=== Nudity and art ===
Female nudes were the dominant subject of painting in French Salons at the end of the 19th century. Female models had become more common than male ones beginning in the early 19th century, first serving allegorical roles or as muses, but eventually becoming individuals "who could be classified and whose history could be written". In academic art – such as that of Chabas – the models were not portrayed as they were, but as idealized nudes, based on classical ideals; the body hair of women models, for instance, would not be shown, and the pubic area was rendered smoothly. The hostess Suzanne Delve, who later claimed to have stood for September Morn, said that models were willing to provide "service to art" by posing nude for such works.

Not all forms of nude imagery were acceptable in France. The end of the 19th century had seen the introduction of various laws against pornography, images of adults and children meant to "provoke, incite, or stimulate debauchery". Works targeted were initially those meant for wide distribution (and thus, the lower class). However, the Australian art historian Fae Brauer writes that the line between art and pornography was blurred by the early 1910s; even tighter laws, introduced in 1908, had resulted in censorship of modernist works. For instance, three paintings by Kees van Dongen (including two of his daughter) were rejected from the Salon d'Automne between 1911 and 1913 on grounds of indecency.

The United States had, since colonial times, generally been more puritan in terms of art than Europe. In the mid- and late-19th century the country's government implemented laws against obscenity, such as the Tariff of 1842 which banned the importing of foreign works of art deemed obscene. By the end of the 19th century, an uneasy understanding had been reached: museums could hold works depicting nudity, but commercial works (including photographs of artwork) could be – and were – confiscated. Tensions remained over the issue of whether nudes represented European-style sophistication (a trait important to the upper-class) or encouraged behaviors which threatened families and encouraged "impure imaginations".

== Creation; identity of model ==
Chabas began work on September Morn in mid-1910 at Talloires on the shores of Lake Annecy in Haute-Savoie, some 500 kilometres (310 mi) south-east of Paris. The model, whom he never identified but referred to as "Marthe", was well known to his family. Owing to the financial situation of the sixteen-year-old's family, "Marthe" had to work to support her mother. On the first day of painting, "Marthe" entered the morning water and instinctively recoiled at its chilliness. Chabas approved of this pose, saying that it was "perfect". Over the course of two summers he worked on the painting, half an hour every morning. The work was completed on a September morning in 1911, (Note: Some sources erroneously give 1912 (such as Time 1957); this would have been impossible, as the painting was displayed at the Salon in May 1912.) giving the painting its name. In 1935, responding to claims that "Marthe" was living in poverty, Chabas explained that she had continued posing for him until she was 28, when she married a rich industrialist, and that she was now aged 41, plump, and had three children.

Numerous women have claimed or been claimed to be the model, some presenting different versions of events. In 1913, a Miss Louise Buckley, performing in Eugene, Oregon, said that she had been paid $1,000 (Note: $34,554 today.) and posed in the artist's studio. The Paris-based artist Jules Pages, meanwhile, stated that the woman depicted in September Morn had been a 25-year-old of good character who earned her living as an artist's model, but had gone into hiding after the controversy over the painting. Other claimants included a Swedish model named Gloria and a variety actress named Irene Shannon; the latter made the claim in the lead-up to a vaudeville skit called "November Mourning".

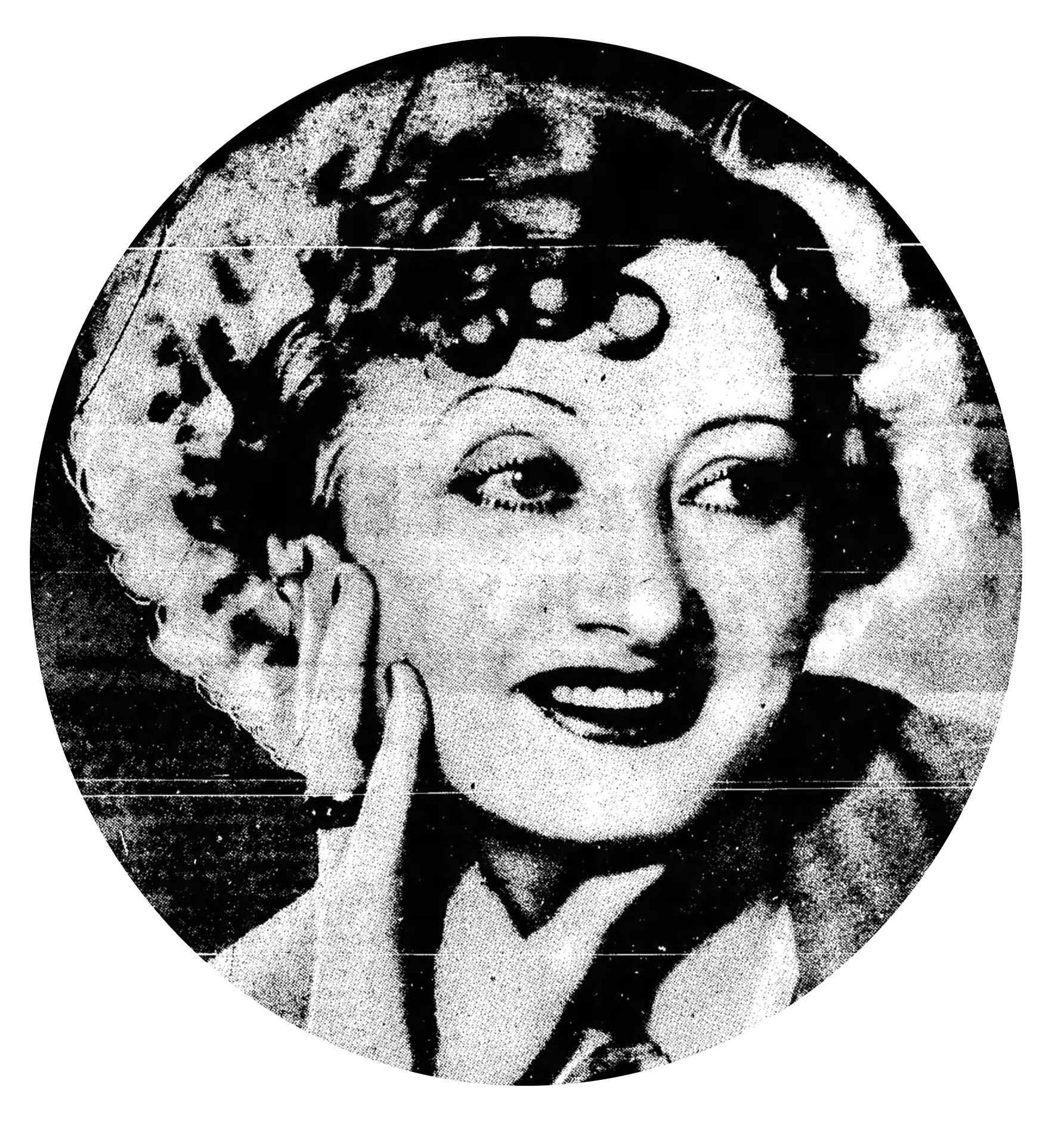
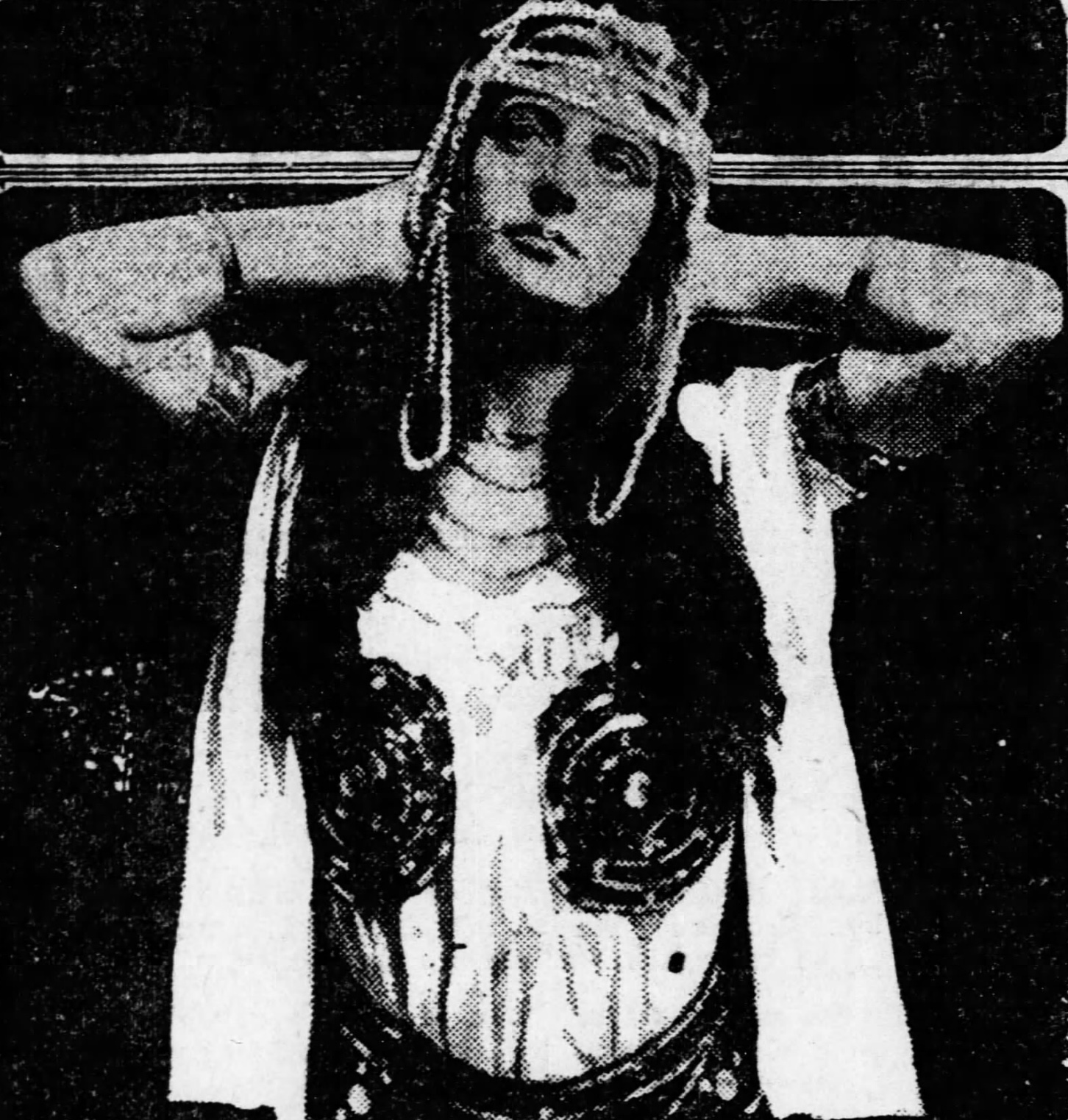
Suzanne Delve (left) and Irene Shannon both claimed to be the model for September Morn.

In 1937, twenty-four years after September Morn caused controversy in the United States, the Parisian hostess Suzanne Delve declared that she had been the model. In her account, Chabas – who had known her since she was an infant – had her pose nude in his studio and later painted Lake Annecy in her absence. Delve described her nervousness at the first session, her mother chatting to her to distract her mind while Chabas's wife played soothing music on the piano. She said she took her pose "instinctively" and that the controversy over the painting had ruined her life, as no Frenchman would want to marry a woman marred by scandal.

Yet another version is presented by the Metropolitan Museum of Art (the Met) in their 1966 catalogue of French holdings, including September Morn. According to this telling, Chabas completed the painting over three summers at Lake Annecy, though his peasant model served only as the basis for the figure's body. The head was based on a sketch of a young American, Julie Phillips, which Chabas had completed upon observing her and her mother dining in Paris; finding her profile to his liking, he silently drew her, then introduced himself and "apologized for his presumption".

== History ==
=== Paris Salon and first sale ===
Chabas first exhibited September Morn in the Paris Salon of April 14 to June 30, 1912. Because he did not plan to sell it, he gave a price of 50,000 francs ($10,000 (Note: $325,758 today.)) – more than he expected anybody to pay. For the painting, and his Portrait of Mme. Aston Knight, Chabas won a Medal of Honor, receiving 220 of 359 possible votes. At the Salon, the painting was uncontroversial, and it was soon reprinted in American publications such as Town & Country and The International Studio.

Sources are unclear as to the painting's provenance after the Salon. According to the Met, the New York-based Philip (or Philippe) Ortiz, manager of the New York Branch of Braun and Company, purchased it in late 1912. According to a 1933 report in the Middletown Times Herald, he paid 12,000 francs ($2,400 (Note: $78,182.)) for the work, but never brought the painting back to the United States. However, Brauer suggests that Ortiz sent it to his gallery in New York, where it caused a controversy. (Note: This is also corroborated by a 1935 Time piece (Time 1935).) According to Time, the painting was acquired by Leon Mantashev c. 1913, after the painting was returned to Chabas.

A 1935 article in the Montreal Gazette, meanwhile, stated that the original September Morn had yet to go to the United States, and that Chabas had sold it directly to Mantashev. According to Chabas, this was after an American approached him to purchase the painting, but was unwilling to pay the asking price. In her memoirs, Vogue editor Edna Woolman Chase recounted how Ortiz had arranged for numerous reproductions to be made and sent to New York, and that – although he had been interested in acquiring the original – he had been unable to do so. Although it is possible that the original did not cross the Atlantic by 1913, it is clear that reproductions did.

=== Controversy and popularity ===
==== Chicago ====
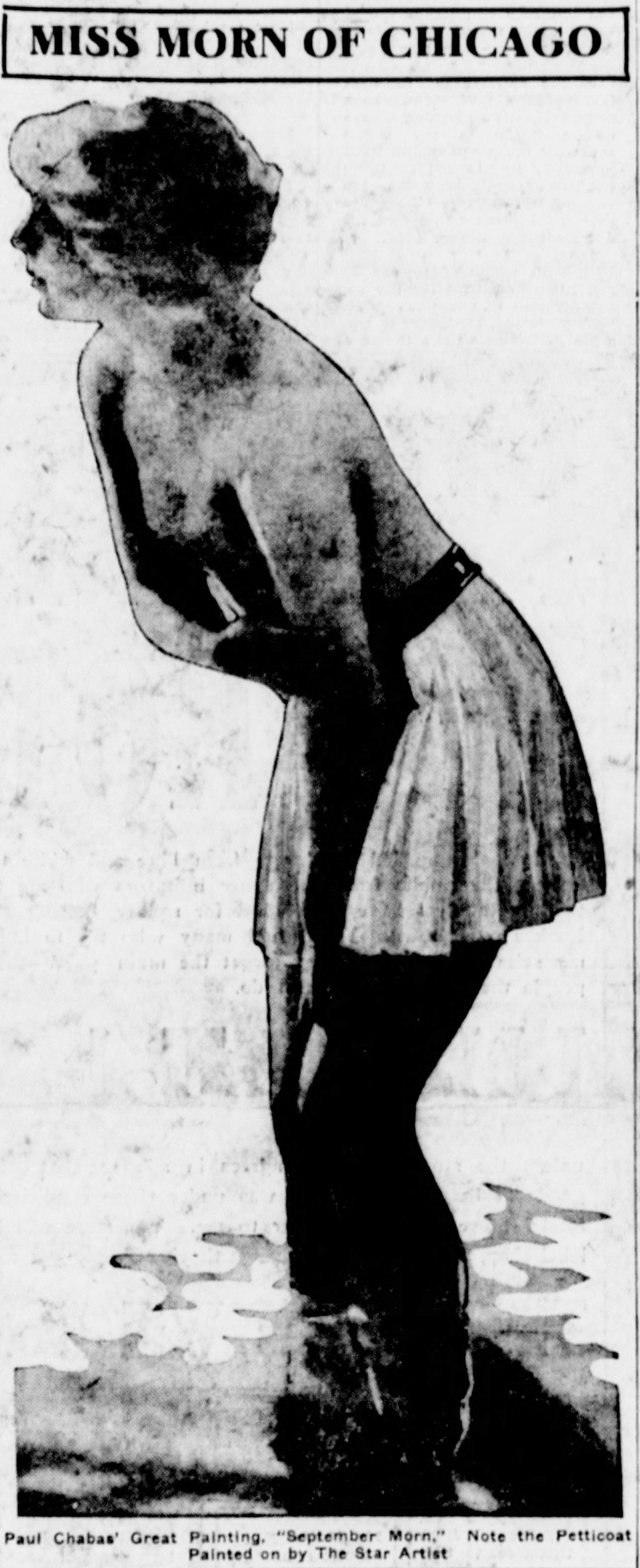
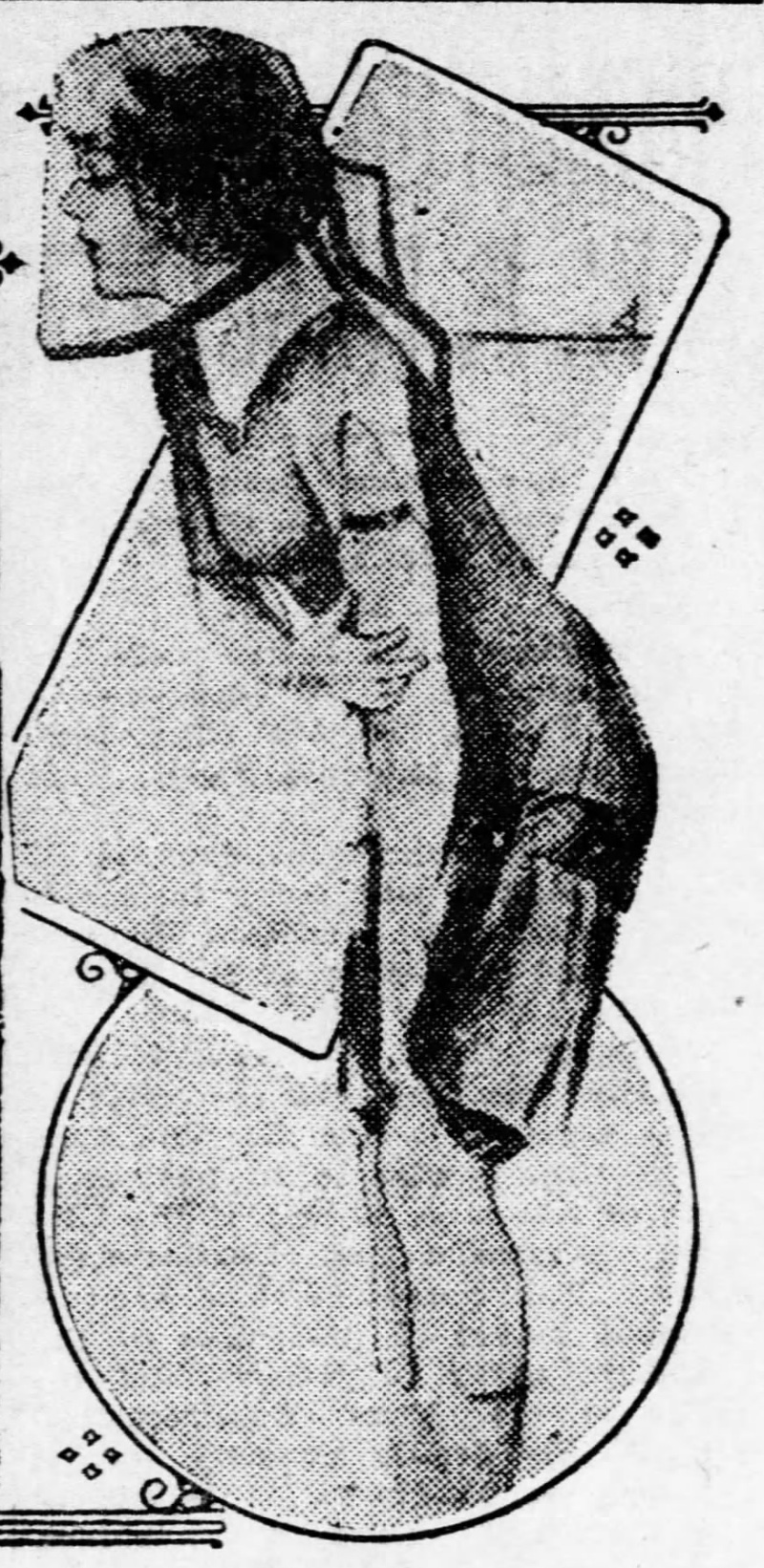
Newspaper reproductions of the painting, censored with clothing

A full-size reproduction of September Morn was displayed in a window of Jackson and Semmelmeyer, a photography shop in Chicago, Illinois, in March 1913. (Note: The store was located at 44 Wabash Avenue (Chicago Daily Tribune 1913).) A passing police officer noticed the print and on grounds that it was indecent, insisted it be taken down. (Note: Sources disagree as to the name of this policeman. Boalt (1913, p. 1) gives "Jerry Sullivan", while The Milwaukee Journal gives "Fred Rirsch" (The Milwaukee Journal 1913, Paris).) The mayor of the city, Carter Harrison IV, agreed with the policeman's decision, and deemed that the image could be sold, but should not be displayed in public as children could see it. Fred Jackson, the owner, was charged with indecency, and at his request the case was brought to trial on March 18.

In front of a jury, the city's art censor Jeremiah O'Connor testified that September Morn was lewd and should not be displayed in public, but rather only in a museum exhibition. (Note: In an interview with the Chicago Daily Tribune, O'Connor stated that he personally liked the painting, but considered it "embarrassing for women to look at" and thought displays would have a negative impact on young boys. He drew a comparison with the Bible, explaining that it "may be good reading for people who understand it, but some chapters are not intended for young folks" (Chicago Daily Tribune 1913).) W. W. Hallam of the Chicago Vice Committee agreed, arguing that, as the woman was committing the illegal act of bathing in public, September Morn had to be banned. Other witnesses for the prosecution included censors, educators, and clergy, such as the superintendent Ella Flagg Young and the head of the Juvenile Protective Association Gertrude Howe Britton.

Jackson, acting as his own lawyer, highlighted the hypocrisy of censoring the painting while a nude statue of Diana stood in front of the Montgomery Ward Building. He called upon painters, poets, and sculptors as his witnesses, including the artist Oliver Grover and the art critic Walter Smith. (Note: The Milwaukee Journal reprinted one poem in defense of the painting, as follows (The Milwaukee Journal 1913, Beautiful): Sometime, glad time, in Arcady, I want to live a day With Joy's slim daughter of the dawn to teach my love the way; To live a day without the clothes, the coin, the masquerade That burden so the struggle here—of hypocrites afraid. Sometime, dear time, in Arcady, im- mune from 'pure' police I hope to find the picture true, that caught its light from Greece; To be as true to life, dear life, as is the painter's dream Within the dawning of the day where new ideals gleam.) In his testimony, Grover stated "A nude woman is no more indecent than a bare tree. Men and women weren't born with overcoats on. Anyhow, indecency may be decidedly apart from nudity."

After less than an hour of deliberations, (Note: Sources differ as to the exact length of deliberations. The San Francisco Call gives 20 minutes (San Francisco Call 1913), while the Escanaba Morning Press gives 45 (Escanaba Morning Press 1913).) the jury found for Jackson, allowing him to reinstate the image in his display; Jackson was so pleased that he promised a free copy of September Morn to each juror. Ten days after the trial Mayor Harrison went to the city council and proposed stricter obscenity laws. The city government agreed, and imposed a $25–100 (Note: $814–$3,258 today.) fine for displaying nude art along public roads and in places frequented by children. By September Jackson (together with fellow art dealers Samuel Meyer and William Kuhl) had been found in violation of this law. Mayor Harrison later stated that he was "through" with the painting, saying "Chicago has been made the laughing stock of the whole country because of this bathing girl picture".

==== New York ====
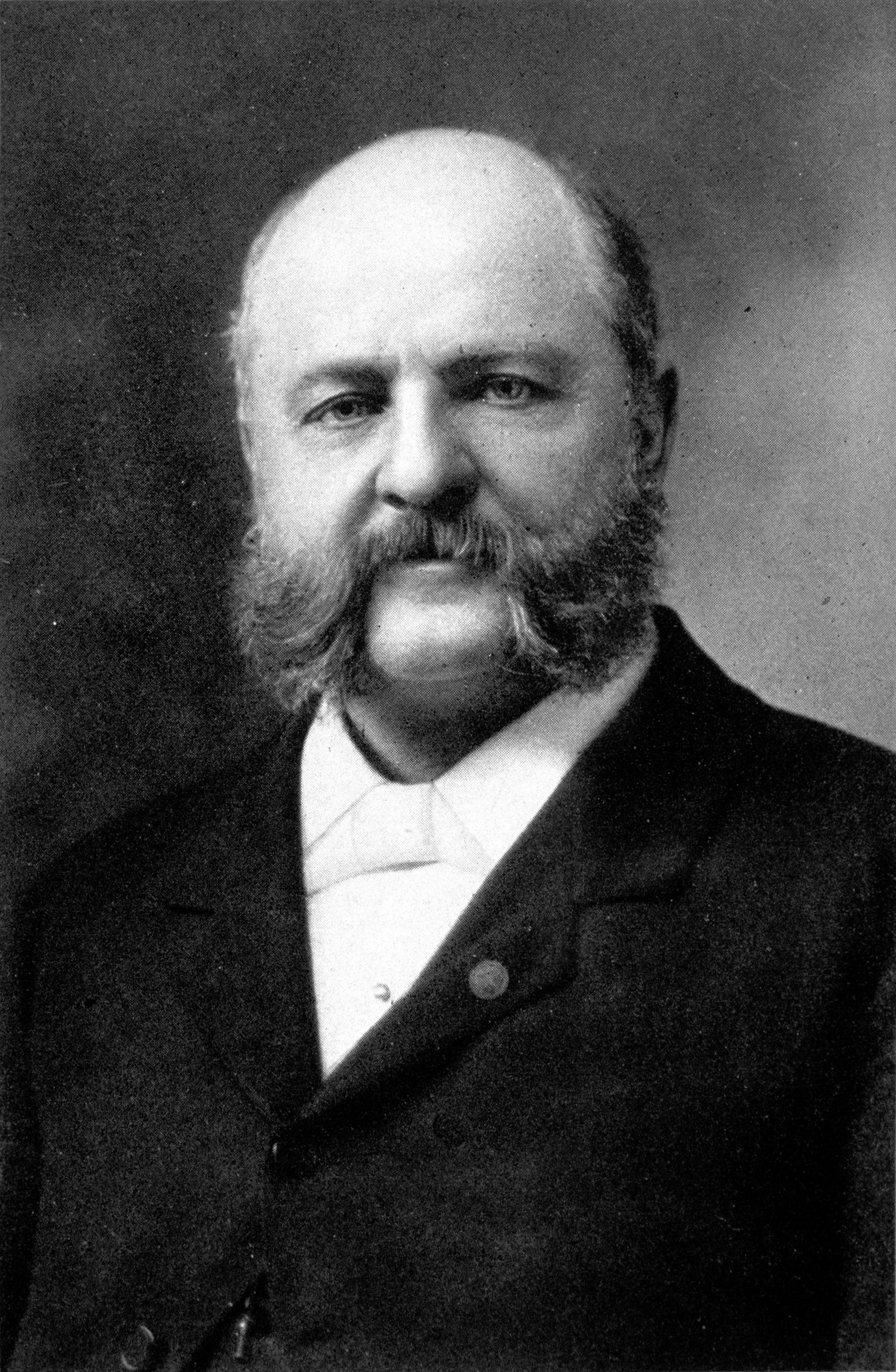
Anti-vice crusader Anthony Comstock; his reaction to the painting promoted further controversy.

Further controversy arose in New York in May 1913, two months after the conclusion of the Chicago trial. Anthony Comstock, head of the New York Society for the Suppression of Vice and nationally recognized for his campaigns against "smut", (Note: Comstock had spearheaded laws at the end of the 19th century which prohibited the inter-state commerce of material deemed indecent or pornographic. Though he had wide popular support, he also had numerous detractors. Comstock boasted that he had seized more than 160 tons of indecent material during his career (Healion 1964, p. 42). He was not averse to arresting art dealers he considered to be peddling reproductions of obscene works; in 1887, for instance, he had arrested Roland Knoedler of the Knoedler Gallery for selling nudes painted by artists such as William-Adolphe Bouguereau and Jules Joseph Lefebvre (Beisel 1998, p. 109).) saw September Morn – sources differ as to whether it was the original or a print (Note: Modern sources stating that it was the original include Brauer (2011, p. 124) and Sterling & Salinger (1966, pp. 222–223), whereas modern sources describing the controversial image as a print include Taylor (2012, p. 166). Contemporary reports are less ambiguous. One describes the controversial image as "grac[ing] a frame less than a foot high" (The Sun 1913, Nude Maid), and in 1933 Ortiz stated that it was a print (Middletown Times Herald 1933).) – on display in the window of Braun and Company, an art dealership on West 46th Street. Rushing inside, he raged "There's too little morn and too much maid! Take it out!". (Note: Other versions are phrased "There's too little morning and too much maid!" (Monfried 1971, p. 9), or include further lines such as "It ought to have been pitch dark for a girl to go wading like that" (The Tuscaloosa News 1937). The version told by Monfried (1971, p. 9) includes Comstock commenting on Jean-François Millet's The Goose Girl while leaving. Yet another quote is given by Ellis (1975, p. 92): "That is not a proper picture to be shown to boys and girls! There is nothing more sacred than the form of a woman, but it must not be denuded. I think everyone will agree with me that such pictures should not be displayed where school children passing through the streets can see them.") A clerk, James Kelly, removed the work, but Ortiz, the gallery's manager, reinstated it in the window after returning from his lunch break.

Comstock threatened Ortiz with legal action, and the manager – unaware that Comstock could not arrest him, and fearful that he could cause trouble for the gallery – was initially frightened. He consulted with Arthur Brisbane of the New York Evening Journal, who told him he had nothing to fear, and sent some reporters to cover the story. The following day, the controversy was highly covered in the press, who hailed Ortiz as "one art expert with the courage to stand up against Comstock and his dictatorship". Following Comstock's visit large crowds blocked the street outside Braun and Company, ogling September Morn. The gallery owner refused to sell his large print of September Morn, so that it could remain in his window.

After two weeks, when the dealership had sold every print it had, Ortiz removed the display. In a letter to the editor of The New York Times, he accused Comstock of causing the controversy to earn greater publicity for himself, and stated that he wearied of crowds outside his shop, who blocked paying customers from entering it. Ultimately, Comstock did not pursue legal action. The historian Walter M. Kendrick attributes this apparent leniency to September Morn's status as a work of art, whereas Gerald Carson, writing in American Heritage, attributes it to a knowledge that no action could be taken against the work.

The controversy promoted polemics regarding September Morn and censorship, and multiple editorial cartoons; one depicted a young woman bathing, only her head showing, with a caption attributed to Comstock reading "Don't you suppose I can imagine what is UNDER the water?". Comstock called the work "demoralizing in the extreme and especially calculated to excite immodesty in the young", arguing that it must be suppressed in the interest of the children. He emphasized that "the law is the law ... the picture will have to come out of the window". Reverend Sydney Ussher of St. Bartholomew's Episcopal Church took a more moderate approach, explaining that "so vivid a display of nudity as September Morn" would best not be displayed in the United States, owing to the people's relative lack of appreciation for art.

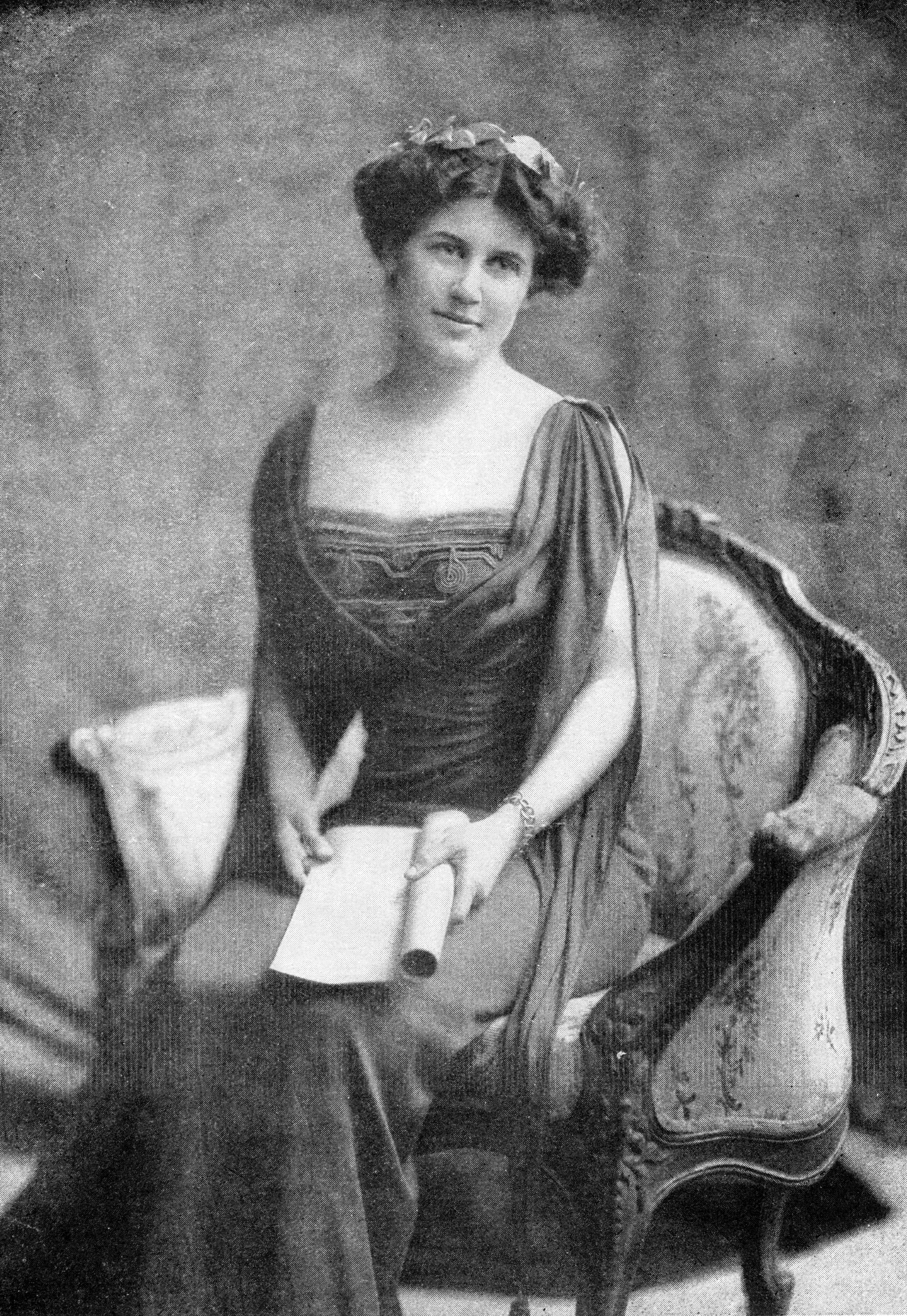
Suffragist Inez Milholland defended September Morn as "exquisite and delicate, depicting perfect youth and innocence".

Others expressed positive views of the painting itself. The suffragist Inez Milholland defended September Morn, stating that it was "exquisite and delicate, depicting perfect youth and innocence", and found it "funny, if it weren't so sad" that such a work would be censored while more titillating film posters were left untouched. The social activist Rose Pastor Stokes wrote that this "glorious work of art" was a "rare" depiction of "the loveliest dream that nature ever made real—the human Body Beautiful" and that shame over one's body should not be blamed on September Morn, but on a failed education system. The artist James Montgomery Flagg proclaimed "only a diseased mind can find anything immoral in September Morn".

In his 1931 autobiography, the public relations pioneer Harry Reichenbach claimed responsibility for the controversy surrounding September Morn – and the work's resulting popularity. He stated that Braun and Company had acquired some 2,000 reproductions of the painting which they could not sell, and then hired him for $45 (Note: $1,466 today.) so that he could unload the stock. They then paid for a large lithograph reproduction to be made and put on display. Reichenbach, he stated, then contacted public figures to protest against the display. When there was no response, he accosted Comstock in his office and dragged him to the dealership, where some young children, whom Reichenbach had hired for fifty cents each, lusted over the display. The public relations man then worked towards maintaining interest in the work, prints of which had already increased in price – from 10 cents to a dollar. Reichenbach's claim that his actions "brought the picture into the newspapers and into fame" has been questioned, particularly given that the Chicago court case had happened months earlier, and contemporary news accounts do not mention him.

==== Widespread reproduction and imitation ====
A 1937 Salt Lake Tribune article stated that, after the 1913 controversies, reproductions of September Morn were shown "on the front page of every newspaper in the land". Ortiz required these newspapers to pay a charge and mention his copyright, otherwise face a penalty of $500 to $1000; (Note: $16,288 to $32,576 today.) Chase recalled that Vogue had been one of those charged. These newspaper reproductions, however, were sometimes censored. Fred L. Boalt of The Seattle Star, covering a local exhibit of a reproduction, explained his newspaper's rationale for such censorship: "For humane as well as other reasons, [...] the Star artist has painted in a short petticoat. He didn't want to do it. He suffered. But we made him do it."

Lithograph copies of September Morn were mass-produced for popular sale, extending the success that followed the scandal, and were widely hung in private homes. Reproductions were featured on a variety of products, including cigar bands, postcards, bottle openers, statuettes, watch fobs, and candy boxes; the model was also popular as a tattoo. September Morn was the first nude used for calendars, and by the late 1950s it had featured on millions. A couplet referring to Chabas's work, "Please don't think I'm bad or bold, but where its deep it's awful cold", was widely circulated.

Media and merchandise

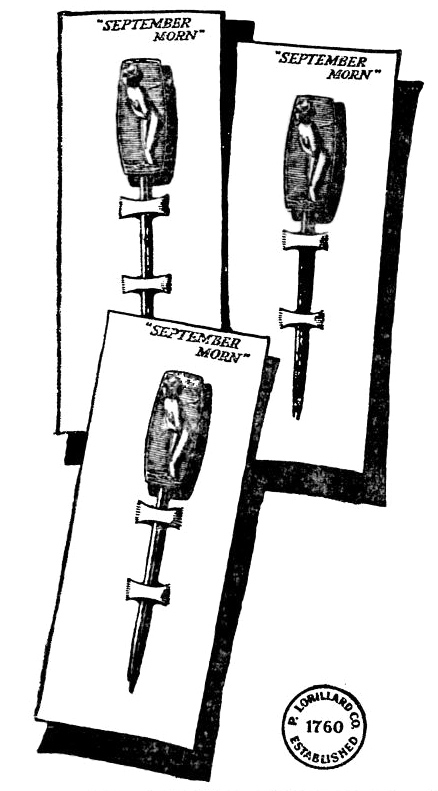
September Morn pins

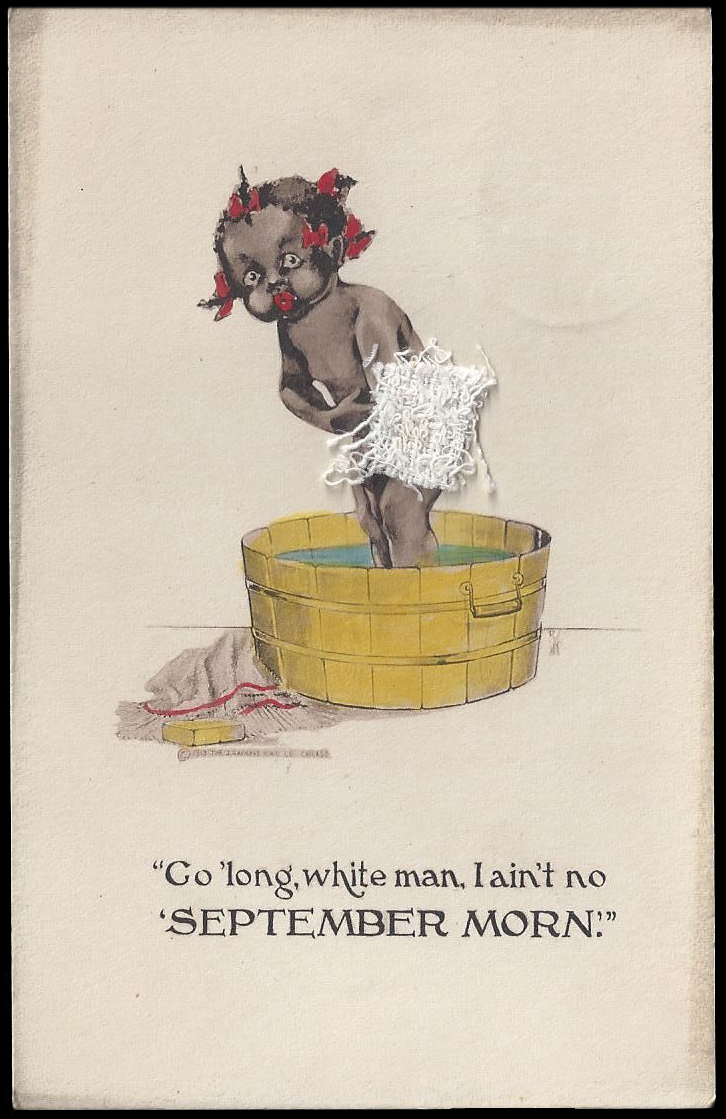
Postcard after September Morn

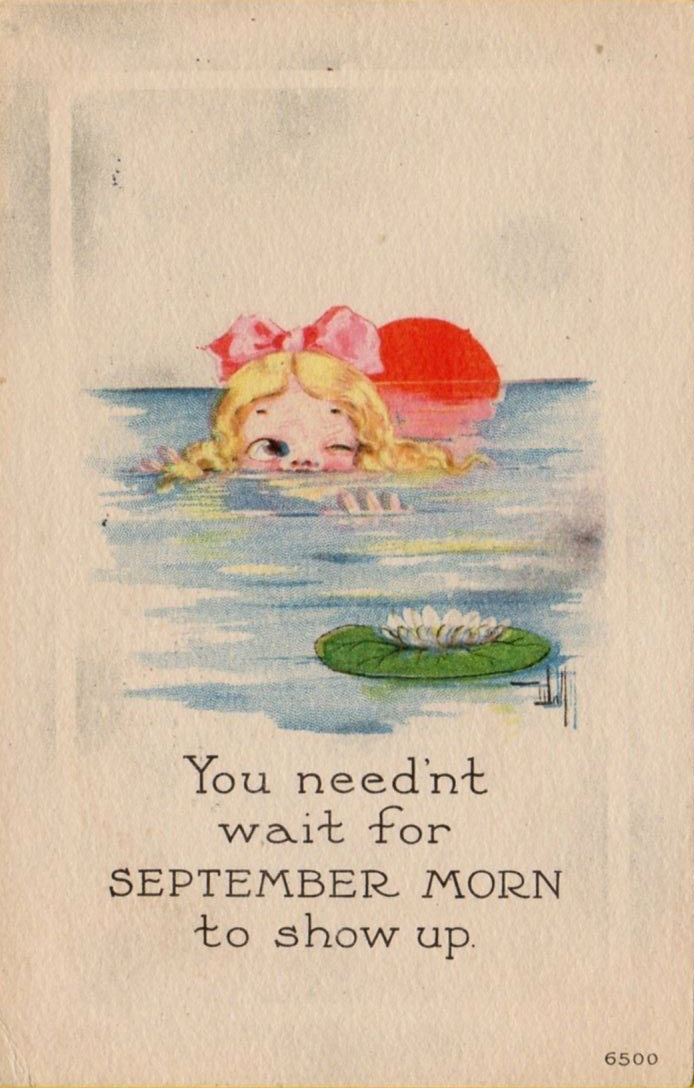
Postcard by Bernhardt Wall after September Morn

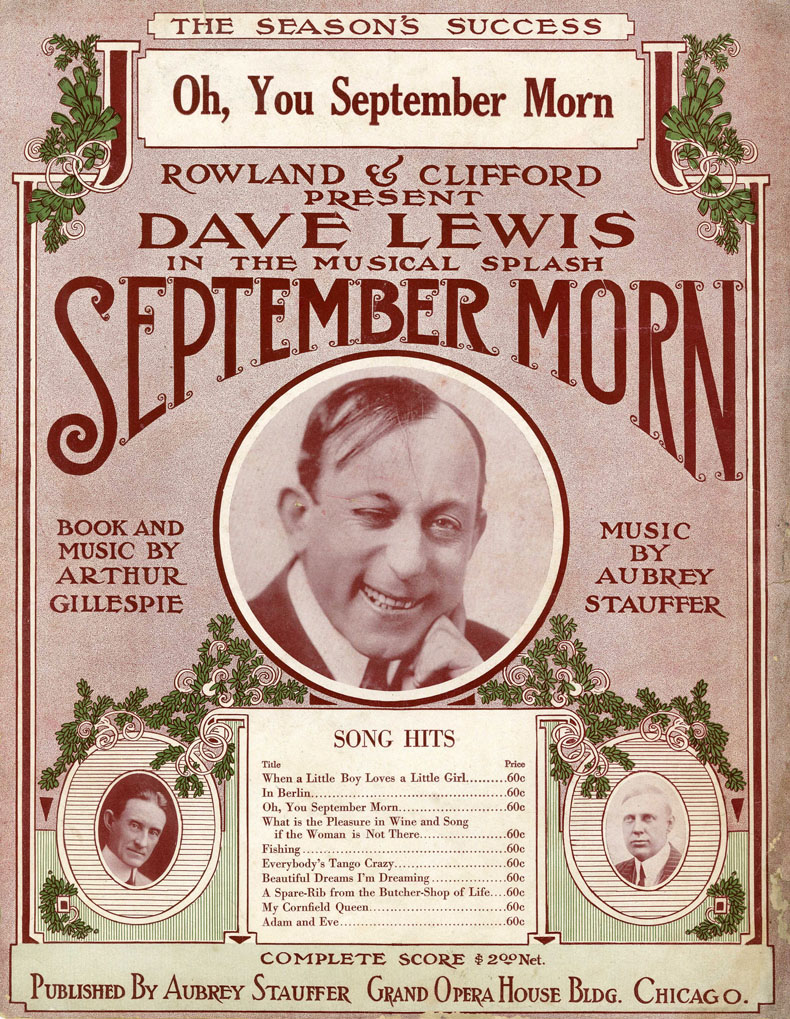
Title page to "Oh, You September Morn", a song from the musical September Morn

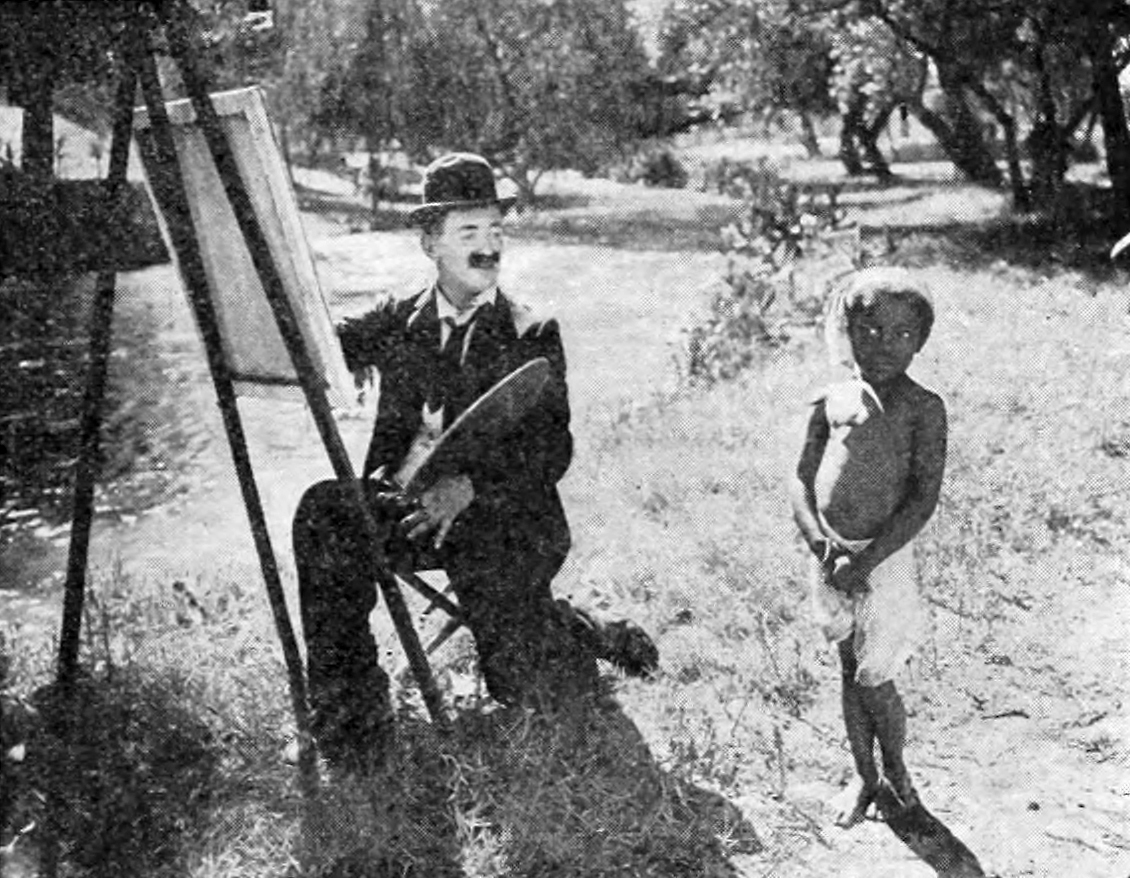
A scene from September Mourning, a 1915 L-KO film inspired by the painting

Allusions to the painting were common in vaudeville acts, becoming stock gags in the Orpheum Circuit. Stage imitations of the painting were also created. In 1913, for instance, Florenz Ziegfeld Jr. cast Ann Pennington as the model as part of his Follies. In this successful version of September Morn, the subject bore a sheer cape, with leaves placed strategically over her body, and stood on a stage made-up as water. A burlesque act, deeming itself the "September Morning Glories", was also created, as was a three-act musical based on the painting. The latter – featuring a fifty-strong chorus line – was put on by Arthur Gillespie and Frank Tannehill Jr. and debuted at the La Salle Theater in Chicago. In Milwaukee, a man wearing "little or no clothing" passed himself off as "September Morn" at the 1915 Wisconsin State Fair; he was brought to trial and fined $25. (Note: $814 today.) Theatrical references to the painting continued into the 1950s. For instance, in Tennessee Williams's 1957 play Orpheus Descending, the character Val sees it hanging in his room and mentions he "might keep turning the light on to take another look at it".

September Morn also inspired several films. A two-reel production by Pathé, titled September Morn, was released in February 1914 and followed the misadventures of a sailor who gets a tattoo of the model. After his girlfriend disapproves, he tries clothing the naked woman with a ripped skirt, but this fails to gain his lover's approval; ultimately, he ends up with a fully clothed nude and the text "Votes for Women" inked on his arm. Meanwhile, September Mourning, a November 1915 release produced by L-KO, portrayed a pair of artists first vying for the attentions of a young woman in the park, then invading a school for girls. Robert McElravy, reviewing for Moving Picture World, found the film funny, but considered it to lack plot. A third film, Lois Weber's Hypocrites, portrayed "The Naked Truth" (an uncredited Margaret Edwards) in a manner similar to Chabas's model. Allusions in popular media continued until at least the 1960s. September Morn was alluded to by a 1964 episode of The Dick Van Dyke Show, "October Eve", where a nude painting of one of the main characters is discovered for sale in an art gallery.

I want that girl they call September Morn;
I'd like to meet her, I'd like to meet her!
Dress'd up like the day that she was born,
There's no one sweeter! there's no one sweeter!
Nothing 'round her but a cloud of mist.
She's a vision that I can't resist.
In my heart she's posing night and day,
I can't forget her, I can't forget her!
I want that girl they call September Morn;
I'd like to meet her. I'd like to meet her,
If you find her won't you please remind her that I'm oh, so lonely, lonely,
Oh so lonely! And I'm waiting for her only.
For that girl they call September Morn.

— Chorus to "September Morn (I'd Like to Meet Her)", by Stanley Murphy

Several songs inspired by September Morn were likewise released. Musicians Frank Black and Bobby Heath penned a song, "September Morn", based on the painting, and Aubrey Stauffer of Chicago published sheet music (for voice and piano) of "Oh, You September Morn", from Gillespie and Tannehill's musical. At Tin Pan Alley, Henry I. Marshall composed two works, a waltz for piano titled "Matin de Septembre (September Morn)", and a piece for voice and piano titled "September Morn (I'd Like to Meet Her)", the latter featuring lyrics by Stanley Murphy. Both were published through Jerome H. Remick & Co. in 1913.

September Morn also inspired an eponymous lime and grenadine cocktail, described in 1917 as having gin, and later in 1930 with rum and egg white.

As interest grew, purity societies attempted to ban reproductions of September Morn, and people in possession of them ran the risk of confiscation and fines. Postcards bearing the painting were banned from the postal system. Harold Marx, a New Orleans art dealer who displayed a reproduction, was arrested a month after being told to take the painting down; displays of reproductions were also forcibly removed in Miami and Atlanta. In Chicago, a man was charged with disorderly conduct after bringing home a reproduction. Irene Deal, who dressed in a union suit and posed as "Miss September Morn" in Harrisburg, Pennsylvania, as a publicity stunt, was controversially fined $50 (Note: $1,629 today.) for disorderly conduct. In 1914, students at the College of Wooster in Wooster, Ohio, burned a copy of the painting for being against their religious beliefs.

Ultimately some 7 million reproductions of September Morn, prints of which remained popular as late as the 1960s, were sold. Reichenbach characterized this popularity as a "laugh on the overzealous guardians of virtue" in which the entire American populace participated. Inspired by the commercial success of September Morn, displays of images of nude women became more common; a New York Times reader wrote in 1915 that they had become "increasingly vulgar and suggestive".

In 1937 Life deemed September Morn "one of the most familiar paintings in the world", and a retrospective Toledo Blade article characterized the model as having become America's number one pin-up girl. Writing in 1957, Considine declared September Morn to be "the most controversial painting in the history of [the United States]", and the New York Post considered it "the most famous nude till the Marilyn Monroe calendar". Carson wrote in 1961 that September Morn had caused "the most heated controversy over nudity, art, and morals" in the United States since Hiram Powers' statue The Greek Slave in the 1840s.

=== Russia and Paris ===
The oil baron Leon Mantashev (Note: Also Mantacheff (MET, September Morn). The son of Armenian oil magnate Alexander Mantashev, Leon was known for his extravagant lifestyle. Robert W. Tolf, in his history of the Russian oil industry, describes him as "Russia's greatest gambler, a collector of paintings, race horses, and beautiful women" (Tolf 1976, p. 100).) acquired the original September Morn in c. 1913, for a price of $10,000 (Note: $977,273 today.) and brought it with him to Russia. After the outbreak of the October Revolution the painting was feared destroyed. Following Mantashev's escape from Russia, pieces of his sizeable collection that were considered to have artistic value were sent to museums, but there was no information regarding works such as September Morn. By 1933 Chabas was seeking information regarding his work's fate, which The Milwaukee Journal suggested was "hanging in some crowded Russian room, its owner perhaps completely ignorant of its world fame". At the time several American galleries had copies purported to be the original.

The painting, however, was safe: Mantashev had smuggled it out of the country, reportedly "rip[ping] it out of its frame" when the revolution broke out. In the early 1930s, (Note: The Met gives 1931 (MET, September Morn) while a 1935 Montreal Gazette article states that the sale happened the preceding year (The Montreal Gazette 1935)) in desperate need of funds, he sold September Morn to the Armenian art collector and philanthropist Calouste Gulbenkian for $30,000; (Note: $746,144 today.) it was the last painting he owned. A United Press reporter discovered the painting, which was framed as a tondo, in Gulbenkian's Paris home in 1935. There it hung with works by artists such as Claude Monet and Paul Cézanne. By 1937 September Morn was on display in the Musée du Luxembourg, hung between works by Jean-François Raffaëlli and Eugène Carrière. The curator John Walker, who between 1947 and 1955 would try to acquire the Gulbenkian Collection for the National Gallery of Art, described it as 'Gulbenkian's only lapse in taste.' After Gulbenkian's death in 1955, the painting was acquired by Wildenstein and Company of New York.

=== Acquisition by the Metropolitan Museum of Art ===
September Morn was purchased by the Philadelphia broker and sportsman William Coxe Wright for $22,000 (Note: $252,192 today.) in 1957. In April of that year he offered it to the Philadelphia Museum of Art, but the painting was rejected for having "no relation to the stream of 20th century art". Eventually he anonymously donated the work – valued at an estimated $30,000 (Note: $343,898 today.) – to the Met in New York City. Speaking for the museum, Dudley T. Easby explained that, although the painting could not be classified as a masterpiece, it was nevertheless "a part of art history in view of the controversy that raged around the picture in earlier years".

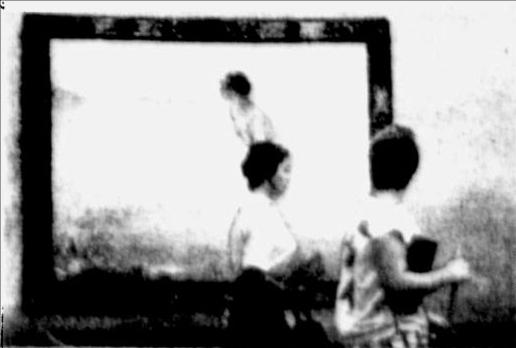
September Morn on display in the Toledo Museum of Art, 1958

After acquisition, in September 1957 the painting was displayed near the Met's front entrance, taking a place previously occupied by the Pérussis Altarpiece. This position of honor was held for several weeks. Hughes reported a "veritable pilgrimage" of visitors came to see the painting, which she considered to add a "fresh, popular appeal" to the Met which drew museum-goers who would never have come otherwise. By then, the earlier scandal of the model's nudity had lessened; discussing an exhibit of the painting in Toledo, Ohio, Alan Schoedel of the Toledo Blade quoted a viewer as saying that 1950s America was so inundated with racy calendar art that the painting "couldn't stand the competition".

After September Morn was acquired by the Met, it was displayed at several venues, including the Palace of the Legion of Honor in San Francisco in 1958, the Toledo Museum of Art in Toledo, Ohio (also 1958), and by the Municipal Art Commission of Los Angeles in 1959. Six years later it was again exhibited at Palace of the Legion of Honor, as part of an exhibition of works collected by the Wrights. In 1971, the Met removed September Morn from display and placed it in storage; Walter Monfried of The Milwaukee Journal wrote that the once-racy painting was now considered "too tame and banal". As of September 2014, the Met's website lists the painting as not on display, though it had been hung in the museum around 2011.

== Reception ==
In 1913, Chabas stated that he was "pained and humiliated" by the controversy over September Morn, though he later expressed more positive views. He described the work as "all I know of painting", and responded positively to statements that it was his masterpiece. In a 1914 interview, he explained that he had not meant to sell the painting, as it "was [his] wife's favorite picture". At the time of his death in 1937, Chabas had only a single picture in his room: a reproduction of the painting, completed from memory; he had boasted "If I had never seen it from the day I put down my brushes after painting it, I could make a perfect copy." However, not having copyrighted the work, he did not receive any royalties from the marketing frenzy in the United States; he recalled, "Nobody was thoughtful enough even to send me a box of cigars."

Reviewing the painting after the Salon, Tr.L. in the Larousse Mensuel illustré praised Chabas's technique as drawing "of a rare purity", and modeling "of a remarkable delicacy". (Note: Original: "le dessin ... d'une rare pureté, et le modelé d'une finesse remarquable") Henri Frantz, reviewing the Paris Salon for The International Studio, described September Morn as "one of the [Salon]'s most remarkable figure subjects", highlighting the nude's "graceful form". In Le Temps, François Thiébault-Sisson found that, despite an "excessively translucent technique", the painting had "indisputable charm" and included "superior, very artistic, and delicately composed" imagery. A 1913 article in the Oregon Daily Journal described the model as "beautifully drawn", and suggested that "it requires a powerful imagination to find anything suggestive in the work".

Later reviews were less positive. The director of the Met, James Rorimer, wrote in 1957 that September Morn stood at "different ends of a wide spectrum" than the works of Old Masters and "modern giants", but was important in helping viewers "realize the full benefit of our heritage" in their explorations of past and present art. That year, the Montreal Gazette's art critic opined that the painting was banal and unacceptable for display in the Met's main hall. The reviewer suggested that September Morn, with its "delicate, pearly tonality and simple, sparse, airy composition", would be best served by being displayed among works considered better by early 20th-century collectors but since reviewed poorly, to "dramatiz[e] for the public the danger of too-hasty judgments". (Note: The critic gave several examples of such works: the paintings of the Barbizon school, the mother and child paintings of George de Forest Brush, and the nudes of William-Adolphe Bouguereau (The Montreal Gazette 1957).)

In 1958, Blake-More Godwin of the Toledo Museum of Art stated that, although September Morn was certainly art, it was not "great art" and was overshadowed by the controversy it had created; the painting, he said, "bears the same relationship to art as a minor poem does to the classic and the imperishable". Three years later, in an article in The Kenyon Review, Alfred Werner described September Morn as a "classic of kitsch" and "the 'idealized' nude at its worst": "without a wrinkle of the skin, without any breathing of the flesh ... pink, soft, spineless". This classification of kitsch has been applied by several further writers, including Kendrick and the film scholar Norman Taylor.

Several writers have included September Morn in lists of works depicting children with erotic or pornographic subtexts. Brauer argues that although the nude "seems to embody the moral purity at puberty", this innocence is actually a fetishistic mechanism which both allowed the work to pass the censors and be eroticised. (Note: Brauer highlights the "voyeuristic" view of the model and her pose, arguing that, although the young woman seems to stand as if embarrassed at being "caught in compromising circumstances", her right arm underscores the model's "bud-stage" breasts while the left directs the viewer's eye to her pubic region (Brauer 2011, pp. 130–131, 136–139). She argues that the model was aged 13 when the painting was completed; the age of consent in France at the time was 16 (Brauer 2011, p. 123). She has elsewhere questioned whether works such as September Morn can continue to be exhibited "innocent of paedophilic dimension", or whether they must be recontextualised as "awkward, anomalous and aberrant" (Brauer 2001).) She concludes that the painting is "paedophilically provocative", and that Chabas was protected from censure by his status as an established artist and father. Such views have not been universally held. For instance, the historian Paul S. Boyer describes September Morn as "charmingly innocent", and the art writer Elizabeth Lunday finds the painting to be "offensive only on the grounds of blandness".

== Works cited ==
- "5,000 Artists Leap Back to Savagery Over Night". The Milwaukee Journal. June 16, 1921. p. 1.
- "A Male September Morn? No! Why, Yes!". The Milwaukee Sentinel. September 18, 1915. p. 3.
- Adams, Katherine H; Keene, Michael L; Koella, Jennifer Campbell (2012). Seeing the American Woman, 1880–1920: The Social Impact of the Visual Media Explosion. McFarland. ISBN 978-0-7864-6661-0.
- "Amusements". The Charlotte News. December 8, 1915. p. 3 – via Newspapers.com.
- "Art: Lady of the Lake". Time. Vol. 70, no. 10. September 2, 1957. ISSN 0040-781X.(subscription required)
- "Art: Twenty-five Years After". Time. Vol. 25, no. 11. March 18, 1935. ISSN 0040-781X.(subscription required)
- "Artist Reveals Story of 'September Morn' Untrue". The San Bernardino County Sun. March 8, 1935. p. 6 – via Newspapers.com.
- "Artist Seeks Trace of Nude". Middletown Times Herald. March 16, 1933. p. 7 – via Newspapers.com.
- "At the Salon and Royal Academy". The Nineteenth Century and After. London. 1912. OCLC 1716918.
- "Au crépuscule" (in French). Musée d'Orsay. Archived from the original on September 19, 2014.
- "Beautiful Bathing Girl Is Victor For Art, But Policeman Doubts". Escanaba Morning Press. March 25, 1913. p. 5 – via Newspapers.com.
- "Bared At Last: The Girl Who Was 'September Morn'". The Salt Lake Tribune. January 10, 1937. p. 84 – via Newspapers.com.
- "Beautiful Shivering Girl on Trial; Must September Morn Be Clothed?". The Milwaukee Journal. March 21, 1913. p. 6.
- Beisel, Nicola (1998). "Censorship, Audiences, and the Victorian Nude". In Smith, Philip (ed.). The New American Cultural Sociology. Cambridge University Press. pp. 109–125. ISBN 978-0-521-58415-9.
- Brauer, Fae (2001). Picturing Paedophilia: The Salon Nymphettes and Child Pornography of 'la Belle Époque'. 27th Annual Conference of the Association of Art Historians. Oxford, England. Archived from the original on March 4, 2016.
- Brauer, Fae (2011). "'Moral Girls' and 'Filles Fatales': The Fetishisation of Innocence". Australian and New Zealand Journal of Art. 10 (1): 122–143. ISSN 1443-4318.
- Boalt, Fred L. (May 20, 1913). "That Shameless Hussy Miss Morn Comes to Town; Poses in 2nd Ave. Window Where All May See". The Seattle Star. p. 1 – via Library of Congress.
- Boyer, Paul S (2002). Purity in Print: Book Censorship in America from the Gilded Age to the Computer Age. University of Wisconsin Press. ISBN 978-0-299-17583-2.
- Bullock, Tom (1917). The Ideal Bartender. Echo Point Books and Media. ISBN 978-1626541603.
- Carson, Gerald (August 1961). "They Knew What They Liked". American Heritage. 12 (5). ISSN 0002-8738. Archived from the original on March 4, 2016.
- "Censor Praises Nude Study, But Says It's Not For Wife". Chicago Daily Tribune. March 19, 1913. p. 12. Archived from the original on December 6, 2017 – via Newspapers.com.
- "Chabas' Original Work Never in the US". The Montreal Gazette. March 29, 1935. p. 6 – via Google News Archive.
- "Chabas's Picture Approved". The Sun. June 27, 1913. p. 9 – via Library of Congress.
- Chase, Edna Woolman; Chase, Ilka (1954). Always in Vogue. Doubleday. OCLC 404419.
- "Chicago Still Squabbles over 'September Morn'". The Pittsburgh Press. September 3, 1913. p. 8 – via Google News Archive.
- Considine, Bob (September 2, 1957). "'September Morn' Made Respectable Through Purchase By Noted Museum". Corsicana Daily Sun. p. 3 – via Newspapers.com.
- Cornog, Martha; Perper, Timothy (1994). "Censorship and Sex". In Bullough, Vern; Bullough, Bonnie (eds.). Human Sexuality: An Encyclopedia. Garland reference library of social science. Vol. 685. Garland. pp. 91–105. ISBN 978-0-8240-7972-7.
- Craddock, Harry (1930). The Savoy Cocktail Book. Echo Point Books & Media, LLC. ISBN 978-1626540644.
- "Discreet Nude That Shocked Grandma's Day To Be Shown". Kingsport Times-News. September 1, 1957. p. 21 – via Newspapers.com.
- "Don't be Afraid of the Policeman; Teach Children to Trust Blue Coats". The Milwaukee Journal. May 4, 1913. p. 6.
- Ellis, Edward Robb (1975). Echoes of Distant Thunder: Life in the United States, 1914–1918. Coward, McCann & Geoghegan. ISBN 978-0-698-10583-6.
- "Eve-like Picture is Held Modest" (PDF). San Francisco Call. March 22, 1913. p. 5. Archived (PDF) from the original on October 9, 2022 – via Library of Congress.
- Failing, Patricia (2003). "Nudes Under Siege". Yale Journal of Law & the Humanities. 15 (1): 173–178. OCLC 60616201.
- "Famed 'September Morn' Finds Niche". Toledo Blade. August 28, 1957. p. 9 – via Google News Archive.
- Frantz, Henri (1912). "The Old and the New Salon in Paris". The International Studio. 47: 102–108. OCLC 1624007.
- Garvey, Timothy J (1988). Public Sculptor: Lorado Taft and the Beautification of Chicago. University of Illinois Press. ISBN 978-0-252-01501-4.
- Green, Jonathon; Karolides, Nicholas, eds. (2009). Encyclopedia of Censorship. Infobase Publishing. ISBN 978-1-4381-1001-1.
- Healion, James V. (December 9, 1964). "New Caanan Crusader Fathered Beleaguered Birth Curb Laws". The Bridgeport Post. p. 42 – via Newspapers.com.
- Hughes, Alice (September 3, 1957). "A Woman's New York". Reading Eagle. p. 15 – via Google News Archive.
- "'Ideal' is Fined". Variety. XXXII (4): 6. September 19, 1913. ISSN 0042-2738.
- "Ideal's 'Morn' Criticized". Variety. XXXII (3): 6. September 19, 1913. ISSN 0042-2738.
- Kendrick, Walter M. (1996). The Secret Museum: Pornography in Modern Culture. University of California Press. ISBN 978-0-520-20729-5.
- Lathers, Marie (2001). Bodies of Art: French Literary Realism and the Artist's Model. University of Nebraska Press. ISBN 978-0-8032-2941-9.
- Levine, Steve (2007). The Oil and the Glory: The Pursuit of Empire and Fortune on the Caspian Sea. Random House. ISBN 978-0-375-50614-7.
- Lunday, Elizabeth (2013). The Modern Art Invasion: Picasso, Duchamp, and the 1913 Armory Show that Scandalized America. Lyons Press. ISBN 978-0-7627-9017-3.
- Matin de Septembre. WorldCat. OCLC 82406310.
- McElravy, Robert C. (November 13, 1915). "September Mourning". Moving Picture World. 26 (8): 1319.
- "Miss "September Morn" Now Mother of 5 Strapping Sons". The Indiana Gazette. April 18, 1933. p. 11 – via Newspapers.com.
- "Miss September Twilight Comes to Vie with Miss September Morn". The Milwaukee Sentinel. May 28, 1913. p. 2.
- Monfried, Walter (December 1, 1971). "'September Morn' Gets Cold Shoulder at Last". The Milwaukee Journal. p. 9.
- "Nude Maid Lingers Yet in Show Window" (PDF). The Sun. May 14, 1913. p. 9. Archived (PDF) from the original on October 9, 2022.
- Oh You September Morn. WorldCat. OCLC 667762496.
- Pattison, James William (April 1913). "Public Censorship of Art". Fine Arts Journal. 28 (4): 243–246. doi:10.2307/25587172. JSTOR 25587172.
- "Painter of 'September Morn' Dies at 68". Life. Vol. 2, no. 21. May 24, 1937. p. 53.
- "Painting of 'September Morn' Has Now Become Respectable". The Berkshire County Eagle. August 28, 1957. p. 3 – via Newspapers.com.
- "'Paris has Nothing on Chicago Saloons when it Comes to Art', Says This Cop". The Milwaukee Journal. March 5, 1913. p. 13.
- "Paul Chabas, Who Painted "September Morn", Dies In Paris". The Gazette and Daily. May 11, 1937. p. 11 – via Newspapers.com.
- "Picture of Nude Girl is Approved". The Spokesman-Review. March 22, 1913. p. 1 – via Google News Archive.
- "Pin-Ups Out on New Calendars". Sarasota Herald-Tribune. December 27, 1973. p. 1A – via Google News Archive.
- Porter, Darwin; Prince, Danforth (2004). Frommer's France 2005. Wiley. ISBN 978-0-7645-7695-9.
- "Quaker City Stubs 'September Morn'". Beaver Valley Times. August 30, 1957. p. 22 – via Google News Archive.
- Reichenbach, Harry; Freedman, David (1931). Phantom Fame: The Anatomy of Ballyhoo. Simon and Schuster. OCLC 857072.
- Rorimer, James J. (Summer 1957). "Notes". The Metropolitan Museum of Art Bulletin. XVI (1): 1. JSTOR 3257718.
- Rosenfeld, Jason. "The Salon and The Royal Academy in the Nineteenth Century". Heilbrunn Timeline of Art History. Metropolitan Museum of Art. Archived from the original on September 25, 2014.
- Schoedel, Alan (August 24, 1958). "'September Morn' Bathes Without Leers in Toledo Museum". Toledo Blade. p. 1 – via Google News Archive.
- "September Morn". Oregon Daily Journal. July 6, 1913. p. 54 – via Newspapers.com.
- "September Morn". Metropolitan Museum of Art. Archived from the original on July 7, 2019.
- "September Morn". Moving Picture World. 19 (8): 1008. February 21, 1914.
- "September Morn". The Tuscaloosa News. May 14, 1937. p. 3 – via Google News Archive.
- "'September Morn', 1913's Naughty Nude, to be Displayed Here". Toledo Blade. June 22, 1958. p. 1 – via Google News Archive.
- "September Morn at Metropolitan". The Montreal Gazette. September 14, 1957. p. 27 – via Google News Archive.
- "'September Morn' Barred From New Orleans Mails". The Indianapolis Star. August 10, 1913. p. 18 – via Newspapers.com.
- "'September Morn' Can't Be Seen in Magic City". The Miami News. January 15, 1983. p. 4C – via Newspapers.com. (reproduced from a 1913 Miami Daily Metropolis article)
- "'September Morn' Creator Coming". Oakland Tribune. June 21, 1914. p. 11 – via Newspapers.com.
- "'September Morn' Creator Dies After Long Illness". Logansport Pharos-Tribune. May 11, 1937. p. 3 – via Newspapers.com.
- "'September Morn' Dressed Up". The Pittsburgh Press. December 19, 1913. p. 33 – via Google News Archive.
- "'September Morn' Echoes". The New York Times. May 2, 1915. p. 9.(subscription required)
- "'September Morn' Given Flame Bath As College Students Get 'Religion'". The Washington Post. December 2, 1914. p. 5.(subscription required)
- "'September Morn' Here". Eugene Daily Guard. December 26, 1913. p. 2 – via Google News Archive.
- "'September Morn' Hides in Luxembourg Gallery". The Milwaukee Journal. August 8, 1937. p. 5.
- September Morn (I'd Like to Meet Her). WorldCat. OCLC 499092520.
- "'September Morn' Is Curse To the Artist". The Oregon Daily Journal. September 29, 1913. p. 2 – via Newspapers.com.
- "'September Morn' Is Real Trouble Maker". The Pittsburgh Press. October 22, 1913. p. 10 – via Google News Archive.
- "'September Morn' Painting Missing". The Milwaukee Journal. May 13, 1933. p. 11.
- "She's the Original of 'September Morn'; Artists' Model Now an Actress and as "November Mourning" She Makes Hit". The Leavenworth Times. December 26, 1913. p. 5 – via Newspapers.com.
- Shteir, Rachel (2004). Striptease: The Untold History of the Girlie Show. Oxford University Press. ISBN 978-0-19-802935-9.
- Sterling, Charles; Salinger, Margaretta (1966). French Paintings: A Catalogue of the Collection of The Metropolitan Museum of Art. Vol. 2. New York Graphic Society. OCLC 231879699.
- Stratton, Clarence (October 1914). "A Note on the Paris Salon of 1914". Art and Progress. 5 (12): 420–421. JSTOR 20561266.
- "Studio Talk". The International Studio. 47: 223–2251. 1912. OCLC 1624007.
- Taylor, Norman (2012). Cinematic Perspectives on Digital Culture: Consorting with the Machine. Palgrave Macmillan. ISBN 978-0-230-29892-7.
- Tolf, Robert W. (1976). The Russian Rockefellers: The Saga of the Nobel Family and the Russian Oil Industry. Hoover Press. ISBN 978-0-8179-6583-9.
- Tr.L (July 1912). Augé, Claude (ed.). "Matinée de Septembre". Larousse Mensuel Illustré (in French). 12 (65): 465. ISSN 0996-0120.
- Vallillo, Stephen M. (March 1981). "Broadway Revues in the Teens and Twenties: Smut and Slime?". The Drama Review. 25 (1): 25–34. doi:10.2307/1145341. ISSN 0012-5962. JSTOR 1145341. (subscription required)
- Valmy-Baysse, J. (1910). Paul Chabas, sa vie, son oeuvre [Paul Chabas: His Life, His Oeuvre]. Peintres d'aujour d'hui. Vol. 11. Librairie F. Juven. OCLC 27405907. OL 14052339M.
- Walker, John (Summer 1970). "How I Didn't Get Mr. Gulbenkian's Art". Horizon. Vol. 12, no. 3. p. 42.
- Wasserman, Saul; Rosenfeld, Alvin (2014). "An Overview of the History of Child Sexual Abuse and Sigmund Freud's Contribution". In William T O'Donohue; James H Geer (eds.). The Sexual Abuse of Children : Volume I: Theory and Research. Taylor and Francis. pp. 49–72. ISBN 978-1-317-76031-3.
- "Wearies Of Waiting A Comstock Arrest". The New York Times. May 15, 1913. p. 7 – via Newspapers.com.
- Werner, Alfred (Spring 1961). "Lawrence and Pascin". The Kenyon Review. 23 (2): 217–228. JSTOR 4334113. (subscription required)
- Williams, Tennessee (1971). "Orpheus Descending". The Theatre of Tennessee Williams. Vol. III. New Directions. ISBN 978-0-8112-0419-4.
- Witchard, Anne Veronica (2009). Thomas Burke's Dark Chinoiserie: Limehouse Nights and the Queer Spell of Chinatown. Ashgate. ISBN 978-0-7546-5864-1.
