= Bernhardt Wall =

American etcher and artist (1872–1956)

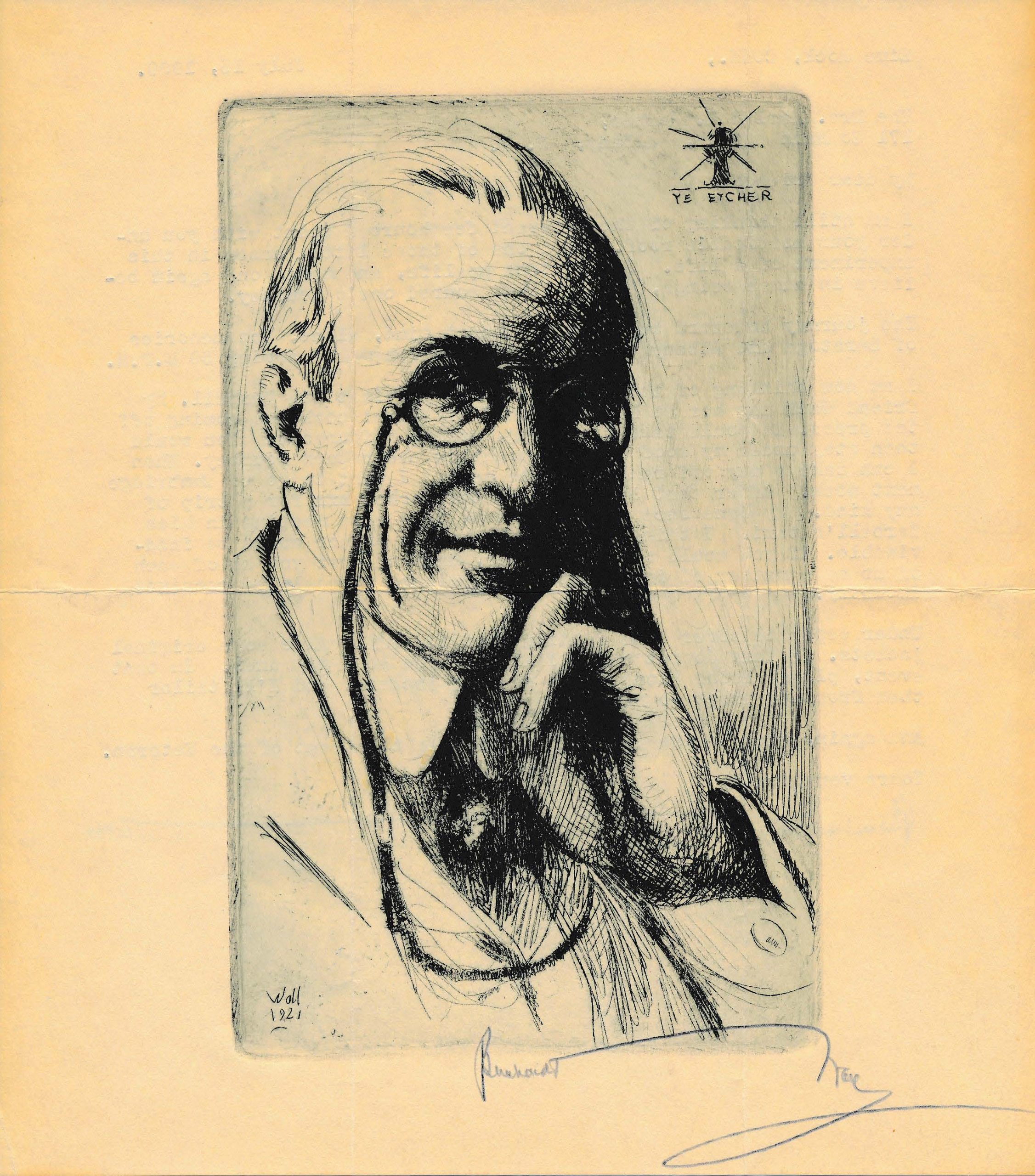
- self-portrait
- Born: December 29, 1872; Buffalo, New York, US
- Died: February 9, 1956 (aged 83); Sawtelle, Los Angeles, California, US
- Known for: etching, lithography, drawing, book illustration, portraiture
- Spouses: Jennie née Hunter Wall (m. 1899) Doris née Turbet Wall (m. 1939)

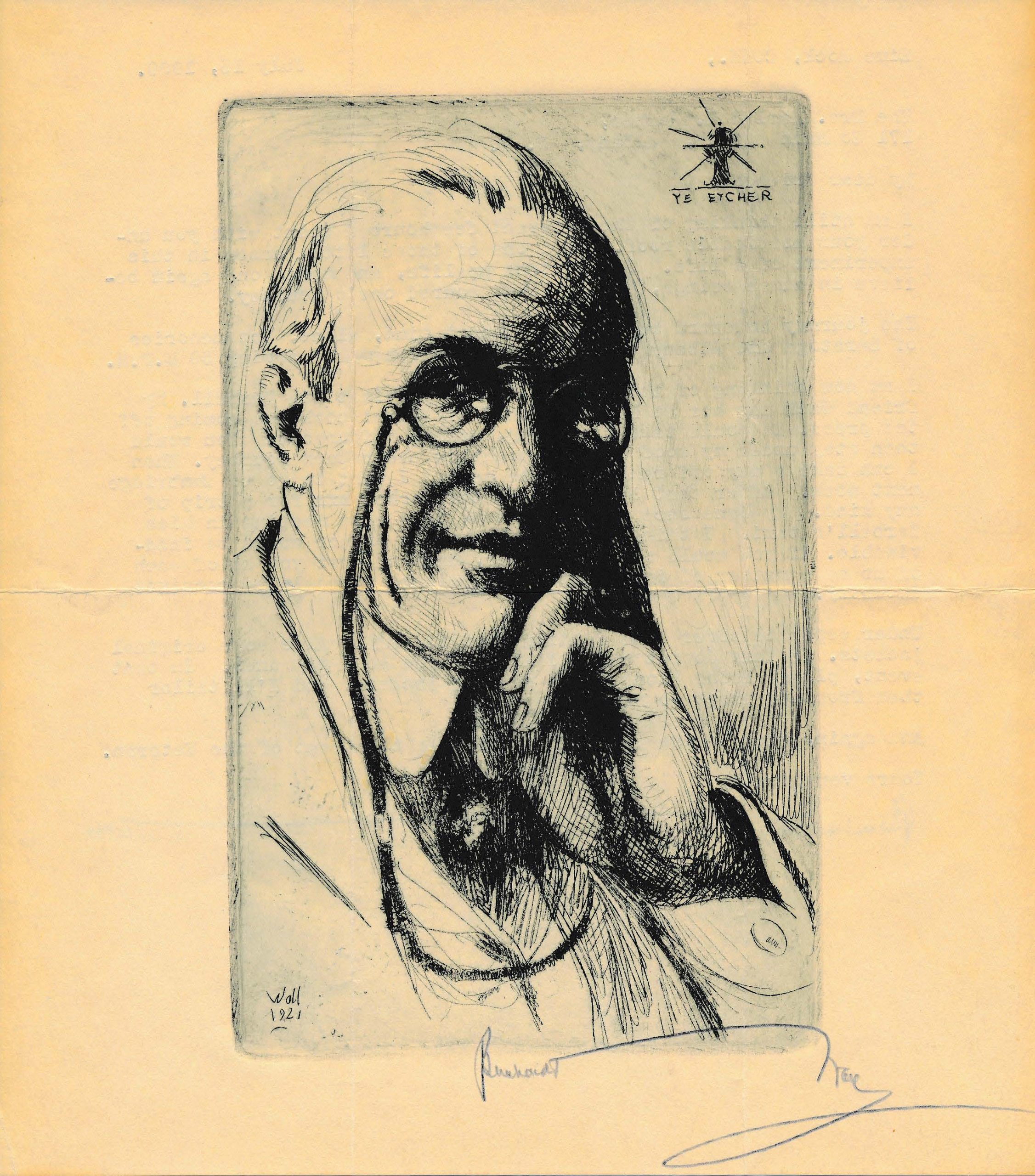
Bernhardt Wall self-portrait, 1921 (etching)

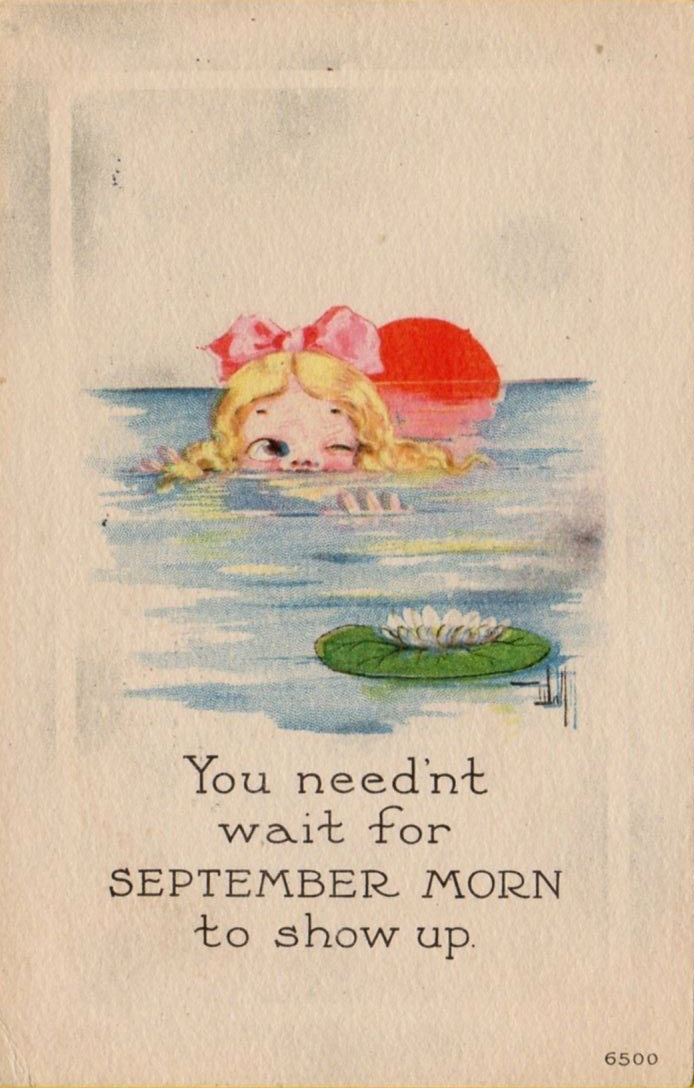
"You needn't wait for September Morn to show up", a postcard by Wall following the controversy over Paul Chabas' painting September Morn

Bernhardt Wall (December 29, 1872 – February 9, 1956) was an American etcher, illustrator, commercial artist, lithographer, craftsman, teacher and historian. He designed more than 5,000 postcards for various companies, earning him the epithet "Postcard King". Wall also established himself as an etcher of famous American political and cultural leaders, particularly Abraham Lincoln.

Wall was born in Buffalo, New York, to German immigrant parents. He showed an aptitude for art starting at an early age and became a student of James Francis Brown, Henry Reuterdahl, and William Auerbach-Levy.

He attended Buffalo public schools and after briefly studying at the Art Students League in Buffalo, he worked as a lithographer starting in 1889. He also worked as a watchmaker and photographer. In August 1893, Wall took a tour of the western U.S. He arrived by train in San Antonio that winter and quickly wove himself in the art scene by teaching, co-owning the San Antonio Engraving Company, and organizing the San Antonio Art League, where he also served as president. His time in San Antonio signaled a long affiliation and love of the state. He met Jennie Hunter (later his wife) while making sketches in Fort Gibson, Texas, and the couple moved to Houston for a brief period. There Wall served as art editor of The Gulf Messenger, a women's literary journal published in Houston, all the while creating sketches of historic sites and portraits of famous people.

Wall returned to New York, where he enlisted in the 202nd New York Volunteer Infantry Regiment during the Spain-American War. While in Cuba aboard the Minnewaska, he sketched the Maine before the ship sank in the Havana Harbor. Following the war, he worked in New York as a commercial artist, producing an array of colored postcards, many of them comical.

He took a trip to Texas in 1899 and married Texas-native artist Jennie Hunter on December 25. In 1900, the couple moved to New York and established a residence and studio located at 1947 Broadway. Wall illustrated two children's books during this period: The Sunbonnet Twins: a Story in Verse and Music for Little Tots (New York: Cupples & Leon, 1907) and Little Karl: a Story for Children (New York: Cupples & Leon, 1908).

Wall delivered lectures across New England, mostly focusing on his adventures drawing and etching portraits of the famous. He also became interested in covered bridge preservation, sketching many bridges across the U.S. and serving as the president of The Covered Bridge Preservation Society for several years.

After a stint as a soldier in World War I, he returned to New York, where he continued to produce postcards, and many of them were patriotic cards based on the war. By his career's end, he had created over 5,000 postcards. He had a successful exhibition of his etchings, drawings, and watercolors in 1915—by this time he had decided to abandon his career as a commercial artist and focus on etching. Wall had earlier studied etching under William Auerbach-Levy, and the teacher had given him a copy of Frank Short's On Making Etchings (London, 1888), which influenced the artist's technique. The artist created etchings based on the lives of notable American historical and cultural figures, capturing the likenesses of Andrew Jackson, Thomas Jefferson, Sam Houston, Woodrow Wilson, Franklin D. Roosevelt, Edgar Allan Poe, Mark Twain, and Abraham Lincoln.

In 1915 and 1916, he visited Colorado, Nevada and California, making etchings of Native Americans, cowboys, and major cities, which were later published in the portfolio Under Western Skies. The project led to the artist becoming a historian of the region. He published two books of etchings (World War Etchings, 1919; Smaller World War Etchings, 1920) based on sketches he made during WWI, and both were successful. These were followed by a book featuring etchings of dogs, Man's Best Friend, which was published in 1920 and quickly sold out.

In 1924, Wall and his wife moved to New Preston, Connecticut, and by 1929, they had started wintering in La Porte, Texas. Wall subsequently published three books related to the area in the mid 1930s, including Following General Sam Houston, 1793-1863, which features 60 etchings.

The couple purchased a small house near Lime Rock, Connecticut, and Wall opened an etching studio there, which was across the street from Dard Hunter's paper mill. Between 1931-1942, Wall serially published Following Abraham Lincoln, an 85-volume set that illustrated Lincoln's life—each volume contains five original etchings. By the end of his career, Wall had published eight illustrated books and 523 etchings based on Lincoln.

In addition to creating etchings for his books, he also wrote, designed, printed and bound them. He also designed many bookplates.

After Jennie's unexpected death in 1938, Wall married Doris Turner, and the couple moved to Sierra Madre in 1944. His last etchings were made there. While in California, he was active in the Lincoln Fellowship of Southern California, and several issues of its annual publication feature a tipped-in etching of Lincoln. After finally settling in Pasadena, Wall died in Sawtelle, Los Angeles, on February 9, 1956, aged 83.
