= Paul Émile Chabas =

French painter (1869–1937)

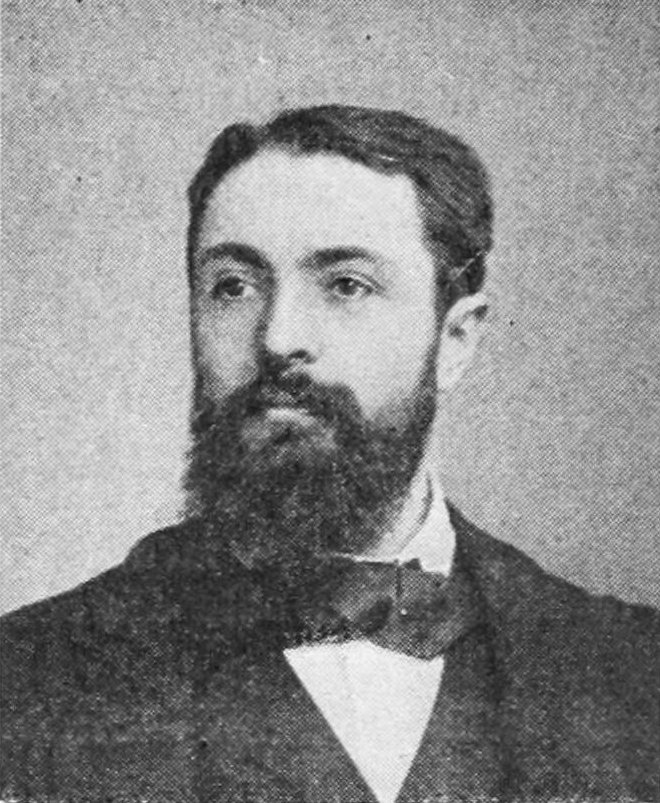
- Chabas, circa 1897
- Born: March 7, 1869; Nantes, France
- Died: May 10, 1937 (aged 68); Paris, France
- Occupations: painter and illustrator
- Known for: member, Académie des Beaux-Arts
- Notable work: Matinée de Septembre

Paul Émile Chabas (March 7, 1869 – May 10, 1937) was a French painter and illustrator and member of the Académie des Beaux-Arts.

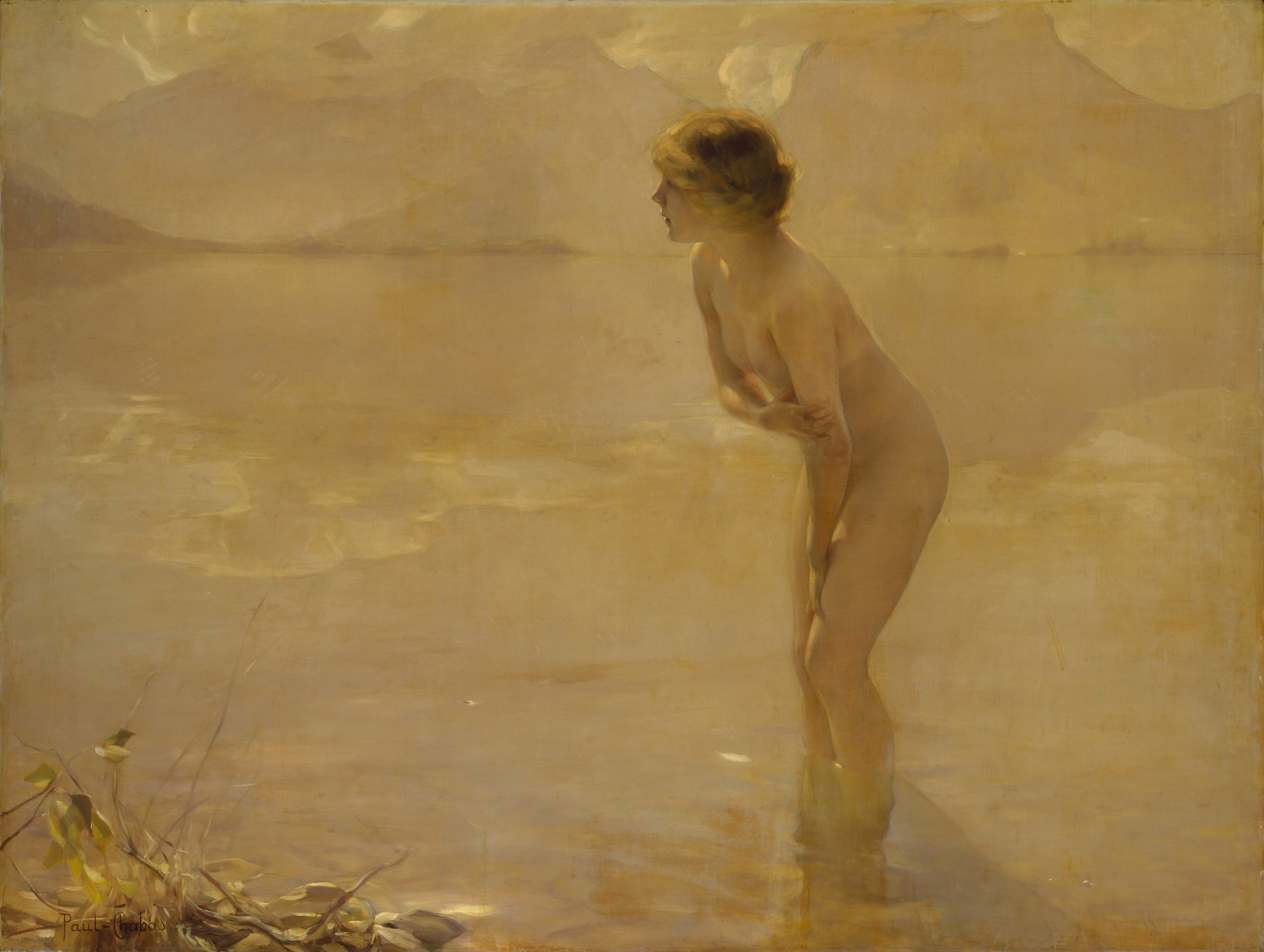
Paul Chabas's September Morn, 1912, oil on canvas, Metropolitan Museum of Art, New York

== Biography ==
Chabas was born in Nantes, and had his artistic training under William-Adolphe Bouguereau and Tony Robert-Fleury. He first exhibited at the Salon in 1890. Chabas won the Prix National at the 1899 Paris Salon with his Joyeux Ébats. He was awarded a gold medal at the Exposition Universelle of 1900 and in 1912 received the Médaille d’honneur. His preferred subject was a nude young woman in a natural setting. He was considered to be one of Europe's greatest painters of nudes.

His most famous painting, Matinée de Septembre (September Morn) (1912), became a "succès de scandale" in the United States in May, 1913, when Anthony Comstock, secretary of the New York Society for the Suppression of Vice, protested against the painting as supposedly immoral. Chabas was offended by the controversy over the painting. For a time he sought anonymity in the South of France. There was much publicity, and reproductions of the painting sold well for years afterwards. September Morn has often been cited as an example of kitsch. Chabas refused to identify the model who was the subject of the painting, referring to her only as "Marthe". However, the controversy regarding the painting's model refused to disappear. As late as 1935, a rumor circulated that the young woman was living in poverty and Chabas was receiving letters from people in the US who wanted to come to her aid. He also recalled how offended he was when the painting was considered indecent by some in the US more than twenty years before.

Chabas first visited the United States in 1914 for a season of painting there. Before the journey he commented on rumors that he disliked the US, as he refused to sell September Morn to a US newspaper publisher after the controversy about the painting began. Chabas said he did not originally intend to sell the painting, because it was his wife's favorite. When he entered the painting in the Paris Salon of 1912, he set a price of $10,000, which he believed no one would pay. Leon Mantashev, son of oil magnate Alexander Mantashev, was willing to meet this price, and the painting was sold to him. Later in his life, Chabas said that he loved the painting, which some called his masterpiece. While Chabas said he supposed it was, he was certain that "in it is all that I know of painting". He stated that he had made no money from the many reproductions of the painting, although many others did. Chabas remarked that those who had profited from his work were not "thoughtful enough to send me even a box of cigars."

In the 1890s, Chabas illustrated books by such authors as Paul Bourget and Alfred de Musset. He also did some illustrating work for the French publisher Alphonse Lemerre. He became a member of the Académie des Beaux-Arts in 1921 and received the Légion d’honneur in 1928. From 1925 to 1935 he was president of the Société des Artistes Français. He died in Paris on May 10, 1937 after a long illness. Chabas, now a widower, died in a room where there was only one painting—a copy of September Morn which he had painted from memory.

During his lifetime, Paul Chabas was also a celebrated portrait painter.

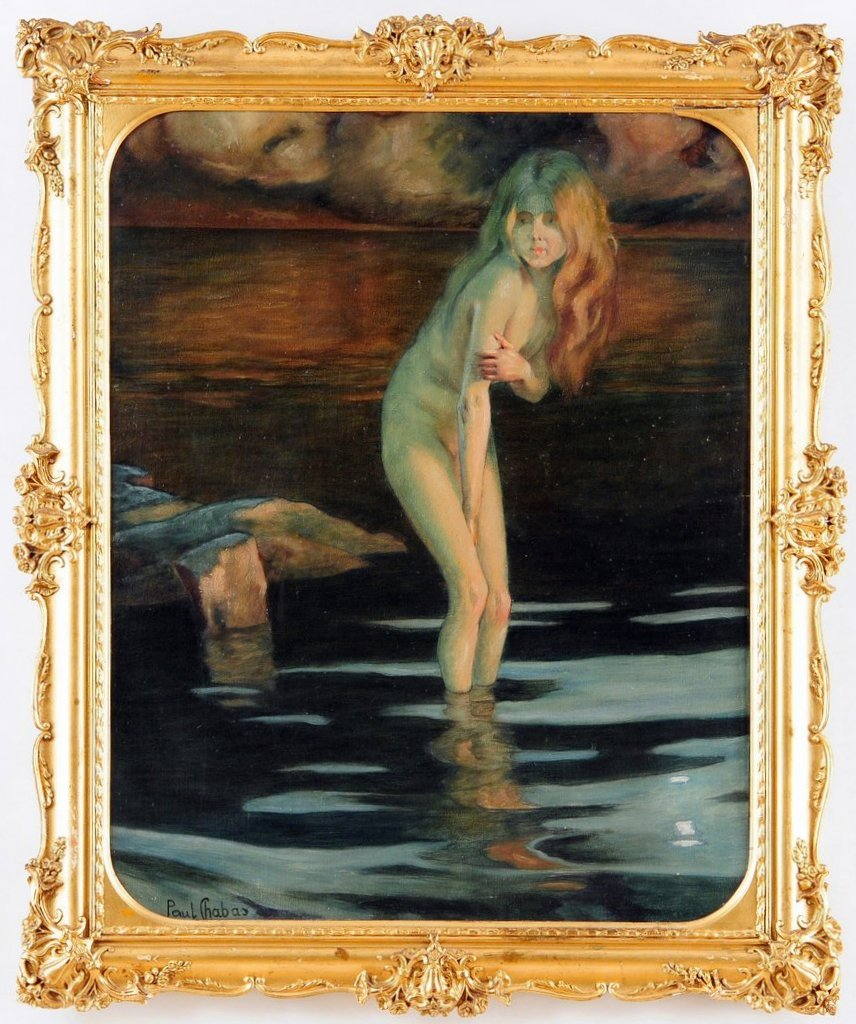
La Baigneuse, 1905–1910

== Gallery ==
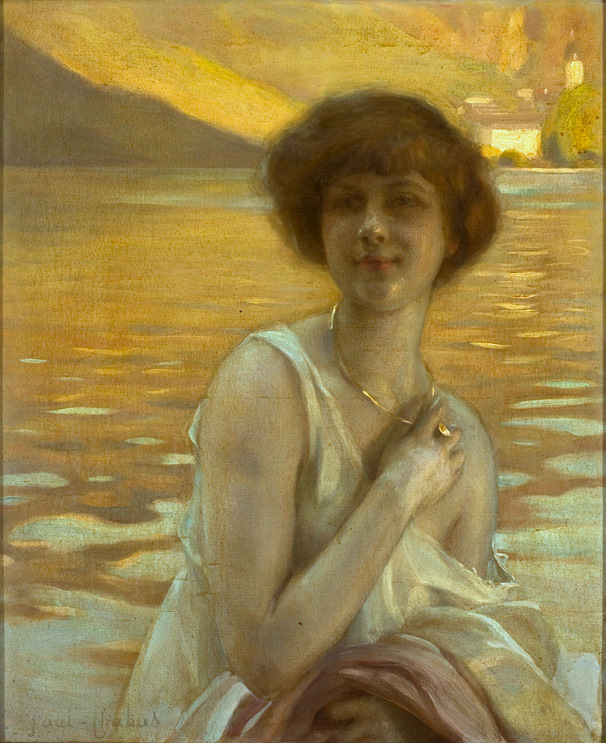
A Lady

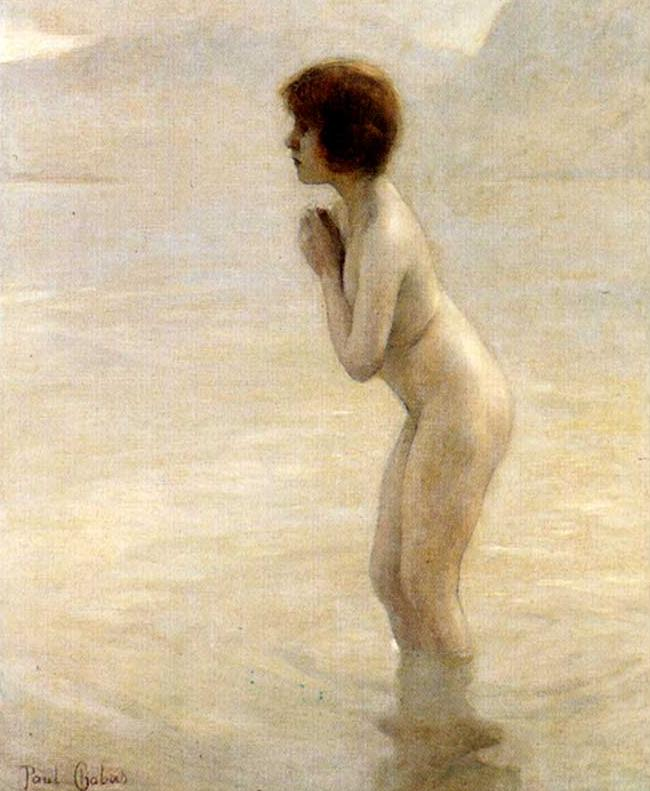
Bruma Matinale

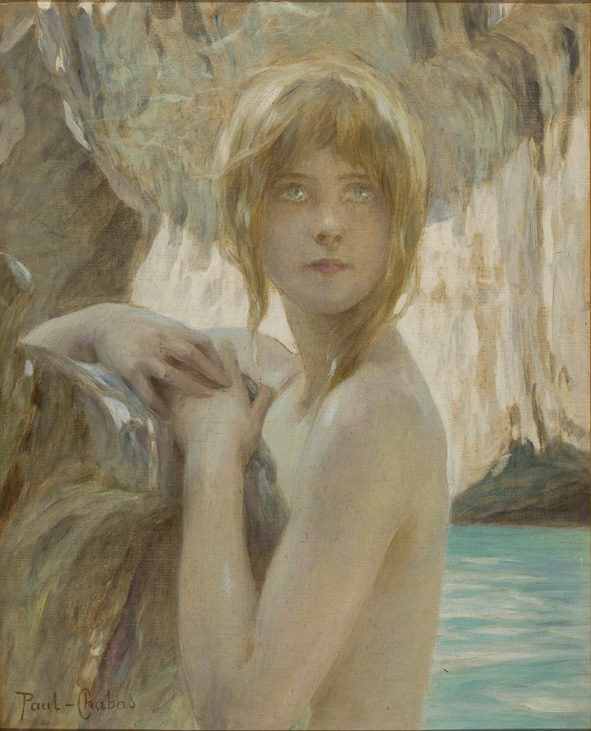
Ninfa Loira

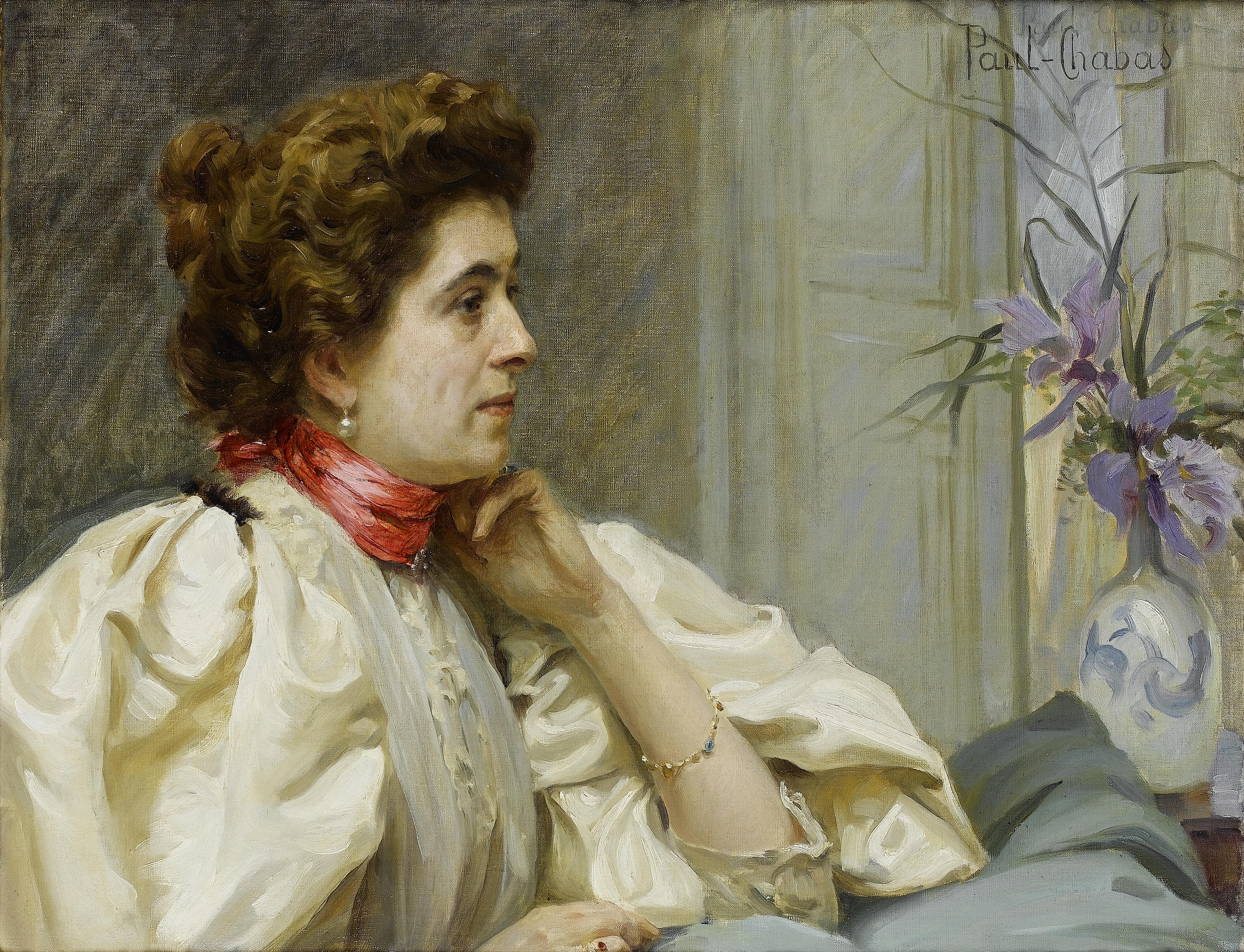
Portrait d'une dame avec un foulard rouge or Portrait of a lady with a red scarf

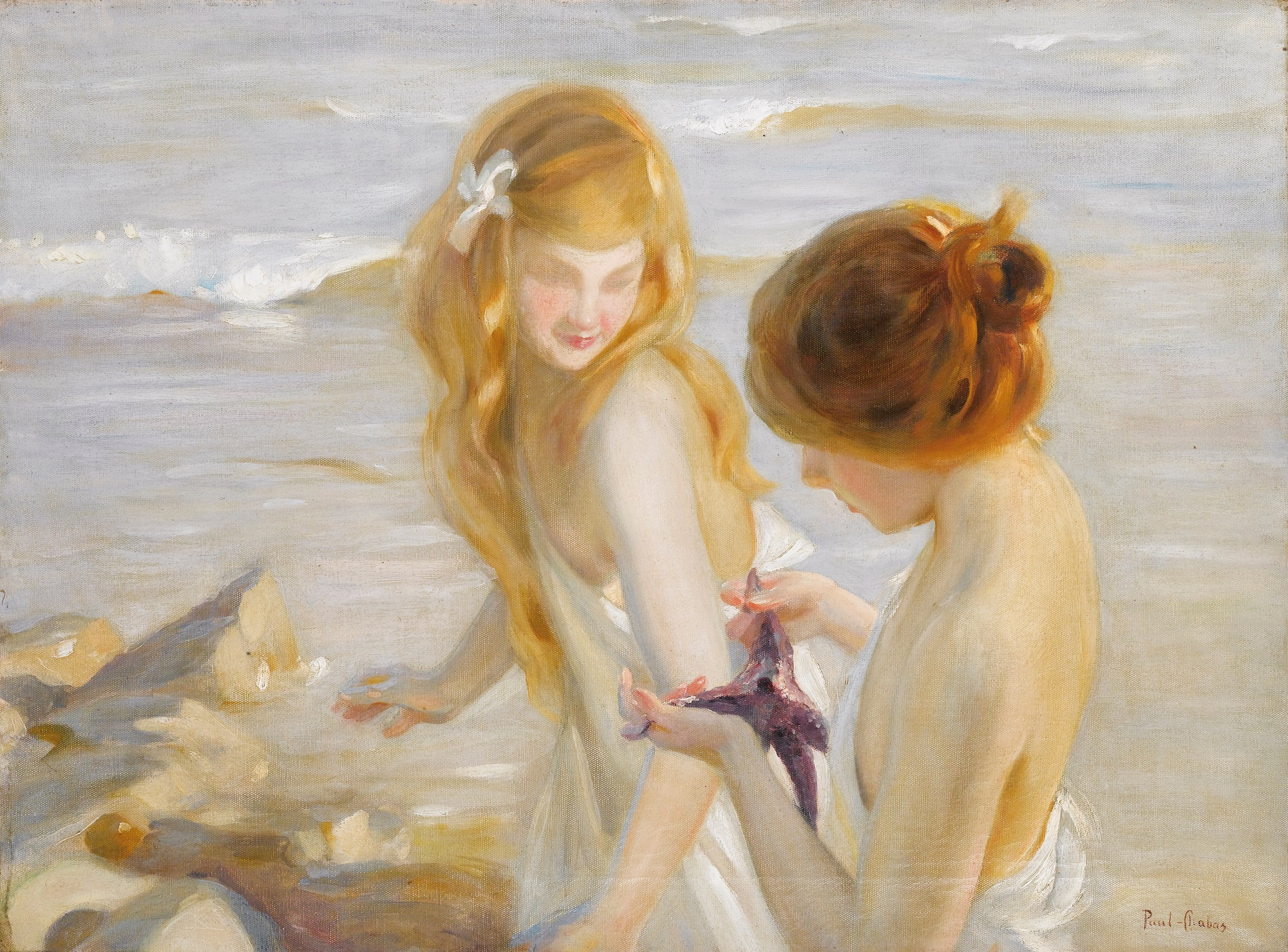
Deux jeunes Filles à l'Étoile de Mer

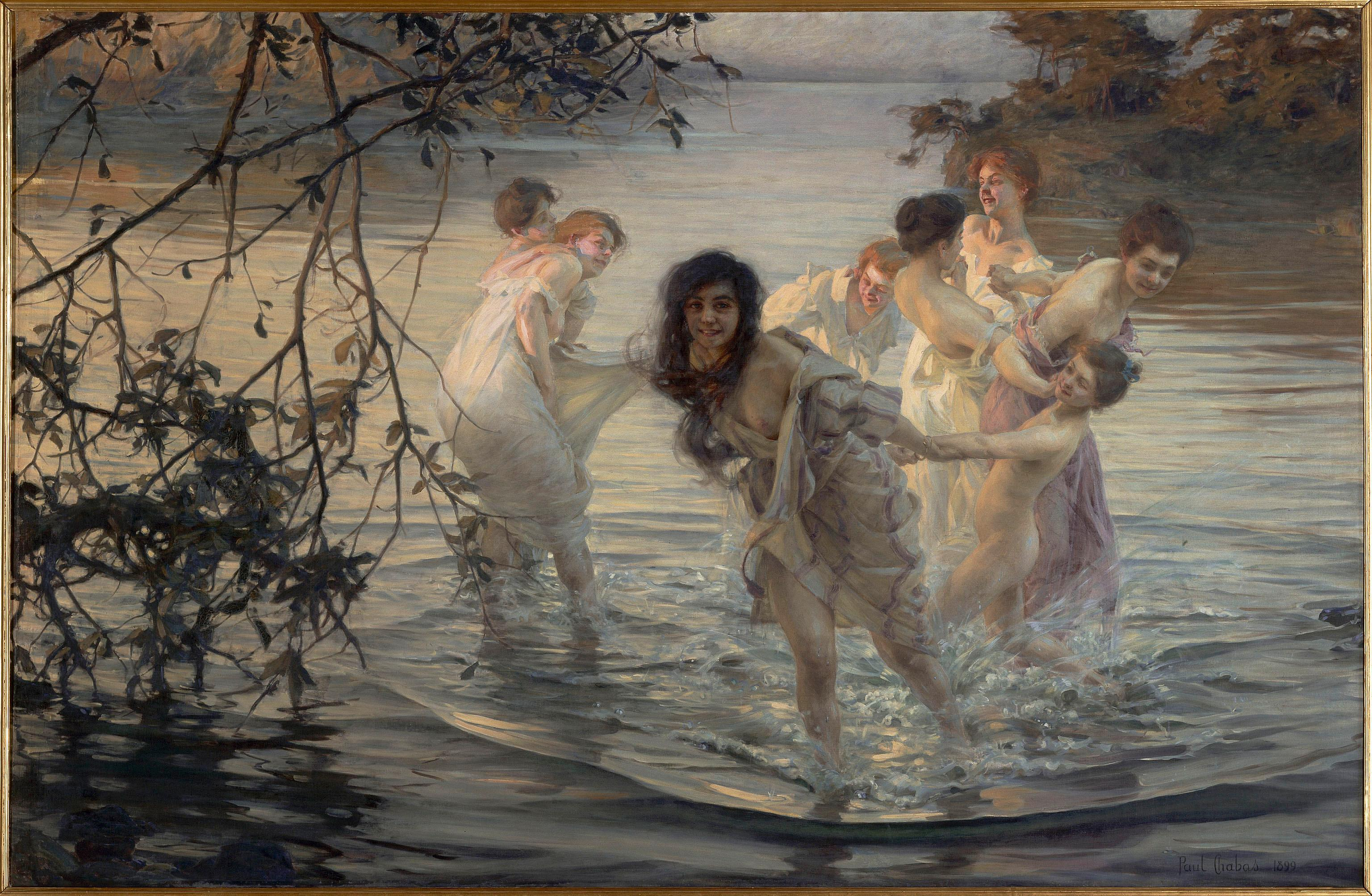
Les nymphes de danse
