= List of former Roman Catholic nuns =

This is a list of notable former Roman Catholic nuns and religious sisters.

== A ==
- Gertrude Abbott – Australian midwife and former nun; founder of St. Margaret's Hospital
- Karen Armstrong – British author and comparative religion scholar; wrote Through the Narrow Gate about her experience as a nun

== B ==
- Monica Baldwin – British author; wrote I Leap Over The Wall: A Return to the World after twenty-eight Years in a Convent
- Wendy Becket – British former nun, television presenter, and art historian; was a member of the Sisters of Notre Dame de Namur from 1946–1970 before leaving due to ill health and becoming a consecrated virgin and hermit
- Eugénie Blanchard – French-Saint Barthélemy supercentenarian, who aged 114 years and 261 days was the oldest living person at the time of her death; she was a Franciscan nun for 32 years
- Katharina von Bora – German nun; left the convent to join with the Protestant Reformation and ultimately married Martin Luther
- Anna Borkowska – Polish former Dominican nun and prioress best remembered for sheltering 17 young Jewish activists in her convent from Nazi persecution during World War II; was granted a dispensation of her vows after the war
- Birgitta Botolfsdotter – Swedish former Bridgettine nun who left her abbey in 1539, after being removed from the position of abbess, and married, which was allowed for nuns following the Protestant Reformation and the adoption of Lutheranism in the abbey
- Kathy Brynaert – American politician, youth development leader, and former Franciscan nun
- Lavinia Byrne – British former nun who in 2000 left the Sisters of Loreto after 35 years after saying that the Vatican had been bullying her to abandon support for women priests
- Miriam Byrne – British priest of the Scottish Episcopal Church; former nun but left and was ordained in 1994

== C ==
- Alice Callaghan – American Episcopal priest, advocate for the poor, and former nun
- Michele Birch Conery – Canadian college professor former nun best known as one of four women who claim to have been ordained to the Catholic priesthood in 2005 against the wishes of Church authorities.
- Jeanne Córdova – American writer and LGBT activist; was a member of the Sisters, Servants of the Immaculate Heart of Mary for two years in the mid-1960s

== D ==
- Jeanne-Paule Marie Deckers – musician and singer better known as "The Singing Nun"; was a Dominican religious sister until 1966 when she was forced out of her convent due to conflicts with her superiors.

== G ==
- Ann Louise Gilligan – Irish Roman Catholic feminist theologian married to Senator Katherine Zappone; was a nun before leaving to pursue an academic career
- Jacqueline Grennan Wexler (born Jean Marie Grennan; August 2, 1926 – January 19, 2012), commonly known as Sister J, was an American Roman Catholic religious sister who rose to prominence when she, as President of Webster College, strove to convince the Holy See allow the transferral of the college's ownership to a lay board of trustees. Webster College became the first Roman Catholic university to legally split from the Catholic Church. She later left her religious order, the Sisters of Loretto, and was President of Hunter College in New York City from 1970 to 1980. She went on to serve as President of the National Conference of Christians and Jews from 1982 to 1990. Born in 1926 in Illinois, Wexler grew up on a farm and matriculated at Webster College in 1944. In 1948, she joined the Sisters of Loretto and went on to teach in Texas and Missouri. In 1957, she graduated with a master's degree from the University of Notre Dame, and in 1959, was transferred to work at Webster College, becoming Vice President in 1960. In 1965, Wexler succeeded Sister Francetta Barberis as president of the college.
- Claudine Guérin de Tencin – French writer and salonist; was brought up at a convent and became a nun, at the wish of her parents, but broke her vows and succeeded, in 1712, in gaining formal permission from Pope Clement XI for her secularization

== H ==
- Marie Louise Habets – Belgian nurse and member of the Sisters of Charity of Jesus and Mary; best known as the fictionalized Sister Luke, subject of the novel and later film A Nun's Tale
- Monika Hellwig – German-born British American-residing academic, author, educator, and theologian, was a Medical Mission Sister from 1963–1977

== J ==
- Mary Johnson – American writer and public speaker; was a member of the Missionaries of Charity for 20 years

== K ==
- Caroline Killeen – American activist, perennial candidate, and former nun
- Frances Kissling – American scholar and activist; entered a convent in the 1960s, but left after six months
- Feliksa Kozłowska – Polish Christian mystic and former nun who founded both the Mariavite Church Catholic Mariavite Church, a faction which was excluded from it in 1935, two denominations that are a schism from and declared heretical by the Catholic Church

== M ==
- Joanna Manning – British-born Canadian feminist activist, Anglican priest, and former sister of the Society of the Holy Child Jesus; left her order around 1970 and married; was ordained a priest of the Anglican Church of Canada in 2011
- Agnes Mary Mansour – American former Sister of Mercy best remembered for being forced in 1983 to resign her religious vows in order to retain her position as the director of the Michigan Department of Social Services as a result of her refusal to make a public statement against abortion
- Judith Ann Mayotte – American academic, humanitarian, author, theologian, and former Sister of Charity of the Blessed Virgin Mary
- Christine Mayr-Lumetzberger – Austrian teacher and former Benedictine nun who was excommunicated from the Roman Catholic Church when she and six others were ordained as priests by an Independent Catholic bishop in 2002
- Colleen McCabe – British schoolmaster known best known for embezzling £3 million from her school in the 1990s; was a member of the Daughters of Charity of Saint Vincent de Paul from 1974–1989
- Lorraine Michael – Canadian politician; was a former nun and schoolteacher

== O ==
- Marianna O'Gallagher – Irish Canadian former nun and teacher, she became an activist, historian and public speaker
- Mary O'Hara – Irish soprano and harpist; was a Benedictine nun from 1962–1974
- Jean O'Leary – American LGBT activist, cofounder of National Coming Out Day and former Sister of the Holy Humility of Mary; wrote Lesbian Nuns: Breaking Silence

== R ==
- Carla van Raay – Australian author, counselor, and former member of the Faithful Companions of Jesus who left the convent in 1969 and later became a sex worker
- Celeste Raspanti – American playwright; was a former nun and college professor
- Maria Agnès Ribera Garau – Spanish writer, women's education activist, and former nun who was forced to join a convent by her father
- Bernadette Roberts – American writer, Catholic contemplative, and former Discalced Carmelite nun

== S ==
- Cristina Scuccia (born 1988) - Italian singer, model, and former nun of the Ursuline Order, winner of the 2014 season of The Voice of Italy; voluntarily left the order to pursue a singing career.
- Antoinette Rodez Schiesler – chemist, academic, Episcopal deacon, and former nun; was a member of the Oblate Sisters of Providence from 1955–1971 when she left to pursue a career in chemistry
- Kirsten Stoffregen Pedersen (1932–2017), nun, theologian, iconographer, widely known as Sister Abraham

== W ==
- Nora Wall – Irish former member of the Sisters of Mercy who was wrongfully convicted of rape in 1999 and served four days of a life sentence before her conviction was overturned; while the alleged rape took place while she was a nun, she left her order in 1994

== See also ==
- List of former Roman Catholic priests
- List of former Roman Catholic brothers
