= List of former Catholic priests =

This is a list of notable former Catholic priests. Both religious and diocesan priests, and bishops, are included. Most persons on this list can fit into one of the following categories:

- Left the priesthood but remained Catholic (voluntary laicization)
- Left the priesthood and the Catholic Church altogether (voluntary laicization)
- Have been laicized involuntarily or excommunicated

== A ==
- Ruard Acronius – Dutch Calvinist theologian and former priest; first mentioned in documents as a Protestant preacher in 1572
- William Edward Addis – Scottish-born Australian clergyman of multiple denominations; first a member of the Oratory of Saint Philip Neri, and later a diocesan priest until his 1888 reconversion to Protestantism
- Gregorio Aglipay – Filipino former diocesan priest who left the Catholic Church to become the first bishop of the Philippine Independent Church; excommunicated in 1899
- Jesús Aguirre – Spanish intellectual and aristocrat; Jesuit priest until he left in 1969 to become a literary editor
- José Inocencio Alas – Salvadorian-American former diocesan priest, friend of Archbishop Óscar Romero, and advocate of peasants' rights; left the priesthood in the 1980s while still continuing his advocacy
- Alexander Ales – Scottish theologian and former canon; converted to Protestantism sometime in the 1530s
- Menso Alting – Dutch Calvinist preacher and reformer; was a Catholic diocesan priest until joining the Protestant Reformation in 1565
- Caspar Aquila – German theologian and reformer during the Protestant Reformation; diocesan priest since 1514 and imprisoned in either 1520 or 1522 for openly adopting Lutheran beliefs
- Jean-Bertrand Aristide – Haitian pro-democracy activist and Haiti's first democratically elected president; ordained a Salesian priest in 1982 and served as a vocal advocate of liberation theology before being expelled by the Salesians in 1988 and leaving the priesthood in 1994 as a result of tensions with church hierarchy
- Xabier Arzalluz – Spanish Basque nationalist politician; ordained a Jesuit in the 1960s before leaving and being laicized in the 1970s to marry
- Francisco J. Ayala – Spanish-American evolutionary biologist and philosopher; was ordained a Dominican priest in 1960 and left the same year

== B ==
- Tissa Balasuriya – Sri Lankan former diocesan priest and theologian; excommunicated in 1997 over a theological dispute with the Congregation for the Doctrine of the Faith with the approval of Pope John Paul II; the excommunication was lifted a year later, but it is unclear if he resumed his priestly functions
- Jan de Bakker – Dutch former diocesan priest who adopted Protestant beliefs during the Protestant Reformation; laicized and burned at the stake by the Inquisition at The Hague in 1525
- Dismas Becker – American civil rights activist and former Discalced Carmelite priest; left his order and the priesthood in 1972; served in the Wisconsin State Assembly from 1977–1989
- Bartholomäus Bernhardi – rector and professor at the University of Wittenberg; later left the Catholic Church for Lutheranism and became the third Lutheran pastor to marry
- Philip Berrigan – American peace activist and former member of the Josephite Fathers; ordained in 1955 and secretly married a former nun in 1970 before going public in 1973
- Phillip Berryman – American author of the topics of liberation theology and Christianity in Latin America; ordained a priest in 1963 and left 10 years later to marry
- Joseph Birmingham – American former diocesan priest from Massachusetts; laicized after being accused of sexually abusing as many as 40 underage boys over a 30-year period
- Ambrosius Blarer – Swiss reformer in the Protestant Reformation; former Benedictine monk who fled his monastery in 1522 after a conflict with his superiors concerning his adoption and propagation of heretical beliefs
- Leonardo Boff – Brazilian liberation theologian and writer; ordained a Franciscan priest in 1964 and left in 1992 due to clashes with church hierarchy
- Barthélemy Boganda – first Prime Minister of the Central African Republic autonomous territory and former diocesan priest; laicized in 1950 for marrying
- Paul Bongiorno – Australian political journalist and former priest
- Martin Adolf Bormann – German theologian and former priest of the Missionaries of the Sacred Heart; ordained in 1958 before leaving in the 1970s to marry a former nun
- Joseph-Antoine Boullan – French former priest with an interest in the occult; often accused of being a Satanist following his laicization
- Roy Bourgeois – founder of the human rights group School of the Americas Watch; ordained a Maryknoll Missionary in 1972 and canonically dismissed in 2012 from both the Maryknolls and the priesthood because of his 2008 participation in the invalid ordination of a woman and "a simulated Mass" in Kentucky
- Denis Bradley – Northern Irish police officer and freelance journalist; former diocesan priest ordained in 1970
- Peter of Bruys – 12th century French heresiarch, or leader of a heretical movement and former diocesan priest who left to preach uncommon Protestant beliefs

== C ==
- David Cairns – Scottish politician and former diocesan priest; left the priesthood in 1994 to become a director of the Christian Socialist Movement
- Francesco Calcagno – Italian Franciscan friar laicized and executed by the Venetian Inquisition in 1550 for blasphemy and sodomy
- Wolfgang Capito – German Protestant reformer during the Protestant Reformation and former Benedictine priest until leaving the Catholic Church in 1524
- James Carroll – American author, historian, journalist, and Roman Catholic reformer; left the priesthood in 1974 to pursue writing
- James Cavanaugh – American former diocesan priest best remembered for an iconoclastic call for reform published in 1967
- Anthony Cekada – American sedevacantist Traditionalist Catholic priest and author; former priest of the Society of St. Pius X until he left in 1983 over a theological dispute; later joined the Society of St. Pius V
- Charles Chiniquy – Canadian-American diocesan priest who left in 1858 as a result of clashes with his bishop; later became a Presbyterian pastor and prolific anti-Catholic writer
- Frank Cordaro – American peace activist and Christian anarchist; diocesan priest from 1985–2003 and left partially because he wished not to be celibate
- John Dominic Crossan – Irish-American Christian New Testament scholar; Servite priest from 1950–1968
- France Cukjati – Slovenian politician, physician, theologian, and former Jesuit priest until 1971
- Alberto Cutié – American former diocesan priest and radio and television personality; converted to and became a priest of the Episcopal Church in 2009 after being photographed with his girlfriend at the beach

== D ==
- Anthony D'Andrea – American mobster in Chicago and former diocesan priest who left after falling in love with a woman
- Daniel Dolan – American sedevacantist Traditionalist Catholic bishop and former priest of the Society of St. Pius X until he left in 1983 over a theological dispute; later joined the Society of St. Pius V
- Michael Dubruiel – American Roman Catholic author, speaker, blogger, and former priest
- Roger Duguay – Canadian politician and former diocesan priest; laicized by his own request in 1999 to pursue political office
- Dermot Dunne – Irish former diocesan priest, current Anglican priest, and 70th Dean of Christ Church Cathedral, Dublin
- John Duryea – American former priest of the Archdiocese of San Francisco; excommunicated by Pope Paul VI in 1976 for marrying a woman

== E ==
- Eadberht III Præn – King of Kent from 796 to 798 and former diocesan priest
- Johann Esch – Belgian former Augustinian friar who was martyred for adopting Lutheran beliefs
- Louis Évely – Belgian Christian spiritual writer; left the diocesan priesthood after conflicts with his superiors over his writings

== F ==
- Carlo Falconi – Italian journalist and writer about Roman Catholicism; ordained in 1938 and left in 1949 to pursue journalism
- Miroslav Filipović – Croatian Nazi collaborator, Franciscan friar, military chaplain, and convicted war criminal
- Matthew Fox – American theologian and former Dominican priest who was expelled from his order largely to the unconventional programming at his Institute for Creation Spirituality, with a faculty that included a masseuse, a Zen Buddhist, a yoga teacher, and self-described witch Starhawk; he joined the priesthood of the Episcopal Church following his laicization
- Giovanni Franzoni – Christian communist, dissident Catholic theologian, and former diocesan priest; laicized by Pope Paul VI because of political and theological transgressions, including his support of communism
- Eligius Fromentin – American politician and former diocesan priest, left the Catholic Church in the 1800s or 1810s
- Dale Fushek – American former diocesan priest and Vicar General of the Roman Catholic Diocese of Phoenix; excommunicated in 2008 by Bishop Thomas Olmsted for establishing the Praise and Worship Center, a congregation outside the Catholic Church

== G ==
- Vernon F. Gallagher – American former Spiritan priest and President of Dusquene University; left the priesthood and the Spiritans in 1972 and worked as an academic administrator at Saint Michael's College
- Florentino García Martínez – Spanish professor and Dead Sea Scrolls expert; former diocesan priest
- Pierino Gelmini – Italian former diocesan priest who founded a famous drug abuse rehabilitation center; laicized by his own request following a 2010 indictment under charges of child sexual abuse of 12 boys
- John Geoghan – American former diocesan priest from Boston laicized by Pope John Paul II after being accused of sexually abusing more than 130 boys
- Michael Glennon – Australian former diocesan priest; laicized in 1984 after being convicted of raping two preadolescent boys
- Johannes Gossner – German philanthropist and charismatic diocesan priest from 1804–1826 before leaving the Catholic Church to become Protestant
- Thomas Groome – Irish-American theologian and professor at Boston College; diocesan priest from 1968–1986 before leaving to marry a woman
- Sally Gross – born Selwyn Gross, was a Dominican priest before leaving the order and exploring his intersex identity; laicized in 1987
- Philip Guarino – American restaurateur, political activist, and former diocesan priest; left the priesthood in the 1960s

== H ==
- Michael Harding – Irish writer and playwright; was a diocesan priest from 1980–1985 before leaving to marry a woman and practice Buddhism
- Peter Hebblethwaite – British journalist, editor, biographer, Vaticanologist, and former Jesuit priest until leaving in the early 1970s to marry Margaret Speaight
- John Hepworth – Australian bishop of the Anglican Catholic Church in Australia (ACCA) and primate of the Traditional Anglican Communion; was a priest of the Roman Catholic Archdiocese of Adelaide before joining the Anglican Church of Australia in 1976 and later joining the ACCA
- Daniel Herman – Czech politician and former diocesan priest who requested laicization in 2007 to serve in the Czech Ministry of Culture
- Franciszek Hodur – Polish-born American founder and first Prime Bishop of the Polish National Catholic Church (PNCC); left the Catholic Church and founded the PNCC in 1898 amidst conflict between Polish American immigrants in the Diocese of Scranton and their Irish American bishop
- Neil Horan – Irish man best known for his interference with major sports events by running on the field to promote his belief in the imminent Second Coming of Christ; was a diocesan priest until leaving in 1974, then rejoining in 1980 and leaving once again and being laicized
- Balthasar Hubmaier – German Anabaptist leader and theologian; former diocesan priest until he married a woman in 1524, effectively renouncing his Catholic priesthood, although his theological beliefs had already been irreconcilably different for more than a year at that time

== J ==
- Luke Timothy Johnson – American New Testament scholar and historian of early Christianity; was a Benedictine monk until the early 1970s when he left to marry a woman

== K ==
- Andreas Karlstad – German theologian and reformer during the Protestant Reformation; was a diocesan priest and archdeacon before being excommunicated in 1521 for his heretical beliefs, but had already left the Catholic priesthood and performed the first Protestant communion service in 1521
- Rob Keighron – American radio and television personality and former priest of the Diocese of Brooklyn; left the priesthood in 2014
- Clarence Kelly – American sedevacantist Catholic bishop and former priest of the Society of St. Pius X; left in 1983 because of his refusal to accept the 1962 Roman Missal promulgated by Pope John XXIII; later cofounded and led the Society of St. Pius V
- Eugene Kennedy – American psychologist, writer, syndicated columnist, and professor; was a Maryknoll priest from 1955–1977 when he left to marry a former Maryknoll nun
- Peter Kennedy – Australian diocesan priest and pastor of St. Mary's Catholic Church, South Brisbane who was removed for breaking Catholic teaching which included blessing homosexual couples and allowing women to preach; laicized after leaving with hundreds of parishioners to form an independent congregation
- Bruce Kent – British political activist and former diocesan priest; was laicized in 1987 by his own to request to avoid Cardinal Basil Hume's instruction to desist involvement in that year's general election in accordance with canon law
- William X. Kienzle – American crime novelist and former priest of the Archdiocese of Detroit; left the priesthood after 20 years in 1974 reportedly for the church's refusal to marry divorcees
- Kenneth E. Killoren – American former Jesuit missionary in South Korea and the first President of Sogang University
- Donald Kimball – American former diocesan priest and radio personality; laicized in 2000 amidst charges of underage sexual abuse
- Harold M. Koch – American former priest of the Archdiocese of Chicago from 1958–1963 before being laicized for psychiatric problems; best known for defecting to the Soviet Union in 1966 in protest of the United States' involvement in the Vietnam War before returning three months later
- Rudolph Kos – American former priest of the Diocese of Dallas; laicized in the 1990s after being convicted on nine counts of child sexual abuse
- Bernhard Knechtung – German Anabaptist leader and leader of the Münster Rebellion; removed from his priestly duties in the 1520s after proclaiming his Anabaptist beliefs
- David Kundtz – American self-help author and psychotherapist; ordained for the Diocese of Boise in 1963 and served for 19 years before leaving the priesthood

== L ==
- Baldassare Labanca – theologian, philosopher of religion and historian of religion, left the priesthood to become a secular academic
- Paul Lakeland – American journalist, author, theology professor at Fairfield University, and former Jesuit priest
- Henry of Laussane – French former Benedictine monk and heresiarch; left the priesthood around 1116 and developed a small heretical sect after denying many critical Catholic teachings
- Richard R. Lavigne – American former priest of the Diocese of Springfield in Massachusetts; laicized in 2003 amidst 40 claims of child sexual abuse
- Micheál Ledwith – Irish academic administrator and former diocesan priest; laicized in 2005 due to allegations of sexual abuse
- Peter Levi – British former Jesuit priest, poet, archaeologist, travel writer, biographer, and academic; left the priesthood in 1977, possibly to marry
- Alfred Loisy – French Modernist theologian and former diocesan priest; excommunicated in 1908 by Pope Pius X for the adoption of theological heresies
- Simon Lokodo – Ugandan State Minister of Ethics & Integrity and former diocesan priest; excommunicated in 2009 for entering politics in violation of canon law
- William Lombardy – American chess grandmaster who was ordained in the 1967 but left the priesthood in the early 1980s over disillusionment with the Catholic Church
- John Loughlin – Northern Ireland-born British political scientist and former Cistercian monk
- Hyacinthe Loyson – French famous preacher, theologian, and priest of the Discalced Carmelites excommunicated in 1869 after years of publicly speaking out against papal infallibility and publishing a manifesto discussing what he believed were numerous abuses by the Catholic Church
- Fernando Lugo – President of Paraguay; former priest of the Society of the Divine Word and Bishop of San Pedro; laicized by his own request in 2008 after winning election to the presidency
- Martin Luther – seminal figure in the Reformation; former Augustinian friar; excommunicated in 1520 for preaching heresies

== M ==
- Francis MacNutt – American former Dominican priest, author, and propagator of the Catholic Charismatic Renewal; left the priesthood in 1980 to marry a woman
- Brennan Manning – American author, public speaker, and former Franciscan priest and later of the Little Brothers of Jesus before leaving and marrying a woman
- Joseph McCabe - English Freethought author, secular activist, critic of the Catholic Church, and former diocesan priest; he left the priesthood in 1896 after losing his faith.
- Fred McCarthy – American cartoonist, comic artist, and former Franciscan priest; left the priesthood in the early 1960s while still joining the Secular Franciscans
- Neil McCluskey - American religious scholar known for his teaching and writing about Catholic Education; author of the Land O'Lakes Statement, former professor at Gonzaga University, the University of Notre Dame and Columbia University among others.
- John Anthony McGuckin – British academic scholar and writer and Orthodox priest; former Passionist priest; converted to the Romanian Orthodox Church in 1989
- Michael McKee – Canadian lawyer, judge, politician, and former diocesan priest before leaving in 1982 to marry a woman
- Robert McKenna – American sedeprivationist Traditional Catholic bishop and former Dominican priest; status unclear as to his relationship with the Catholic Church as he founded unsanctioned organizations at odds with church teachings and participated in multiple unauthorized consecrations of bishops, yet was never officially expelled from the priesthood or the Dominicans
- Neil McKenty – Canadian radio and television host, author, and former Jesuit priest until 1970
- John McLaughlin – American television personality, political commentator, and former Jesuit priest; left the order in 1970 over disagreements with the editor of the Jesuit-produced Catholic magazine America, where he was working at the time
- Jose Mercau – Argentinian former diocesan priest excommunicated by Pope Francis in 2014
- Emmanuel Milingo – former diocesan priest and Archbishop of Lusaka; married a woman in 2001, was automatically excommunicated in 2006 after consecrating four married men bishops without papal mandate, and was officially announced to be laicized in 2009
- Józef Milik – Polish Biblical scholar, multi-linguist, Dead Sea Scrolls expert, and former diocesan priest; was a priest from 1946–1969 when he left to marry a woman
- David de Moravia – Scottish former priest and bishop; excommunicated twice, once in 1306 when he was charged by King Edward I of England with complicity in the murder of John III Comyn, Lord of Badenoch, and again in 1322 by Pope John XXII, as an abettor of King Robert I of Scotland, enemy of King Edward II of England.
- Jonathan Morris - Fox news commentator who left the priesthood to get married.
- Thomas Müntzer – German Protestant preacher and theologian during the early Protestant Reformation, and a rebel leader during the German Peasants' War; had been a Catholic diocesan priest until 1519 when he took up a position as pastor at a Lutheran church
- Romolo Murri – Italian politician and former diocesan priest; laicized in 1905 for joining the political party Lega Democratica Nazionale

== N ==
- Xavier Novell i Gomà - Formerly the Bishop of Solsona in Catalonia Spain. Resigned to marry an erotic novelist.

== O ==
- Charles J. O'Byrne – American lawyer, political staffer, and former Jesuit priest; was a Jesuit from 1996–2002 and was dismissed voluntarily after his superiors determined he no longer wished to be in the order; he later came out as gay and is now a practicing Episcopalian
- John O'Donahue – Irish poet, author, Hegelian philosopher, and former diocesan priest who left in 2000
- Gerald O'Donovan – Irish-British former diocesan priest and writer; left the priesthood in 1908 after moving to London but failing to find employment
- Oliver O'Grady – Irish former diocesan priest; laicized after being charged and convicted of the sexual abuse of at least 25 children in California from 1973–1990s
- Huub Oosterhuis – Dutch theologian, writer, poet, composer, and former Jesuit priest; left the order in 1969 and was pastor of an independent Catholic church and married a woman
- Joseph O'Rourke – American pro-choice activist and former Jesuit priest; dismissed from the Jesuits and later laicized over his unauthorized baptism of a child whose mother publicly supported abortion rights; remained Catholic while strongly criticizing church teaching on sexuality
- Derry O'Sullivan – Irish-French poet and former diocesan priest
- Julian Joseph Overbeck – British former diocesan priest who converted to Eastern Orthodoxy and became a pioneer of Western Rite Orthodoxy; originally converted to Lutheranism and married, and was received into the Russian Orthodox Church in 1865

== P ==
- Jacob Palaeologus – Chian Dominican friar who renounced his vows to become an antitrinitarian theologian and preacher
- Edward Paquette – American former diocesan priest in Massachusetts, Indiana, and Vermont; laicized by Pope Benedict XVI in the 2000s for numerous instances of child sexual abuse spanning from the 1960s to the 1990s
- André Paul – French theologian, educator, author, and former member of the Society of Priests of Saint Sulpice; left to marry a woman
- Frank Pavone – American anti-abortion leader, laicized in November 2022 for "blasphemous" speech and disobedience to his superiors.
- James Porter – American former diocesan priest laicized after being convicted of sexually abusing 28 children and admitting to molesting at least 100 from the 1960s–1990s

== R ==
- Patrick Rice – Irish Argentinian-residing human rights activist and former priest of the Little Brothers of the Gospel from 1972–1985, when he left to marry an Argentinian woman
- Gerald Ridsdale – Australian priest and school and hospital chaplain; laicized after being convicted between 1993 and 2013 of numerous cases of child sexual abuse and indecent assault against 54 children
- John Rogers – English former diocesan priest, Bible translator and commentator, and the first English Protestant martyr under Queen Mary I of England; abandoned the Catholic Church in the 1530s under the influence of William Tyndale
- Barry Ryan – American former diocesan priest suspended from priestly duties and later laicized amidst allegations of child sexual abuse; later convicted of sexual abuse of a 6-year-old boy in 2003

== S ==
- Sigmund Salminger – German printer, hymn writer, and former Franciscan priest until he was baptized an Anabaptist by Hans Hut and married
- Gavriel Aryeh Sanders - former diocesan priest and former Evangelical minister, converted to Orthodox Judaism.
- Tom Savage - Irish former diocesan priest, broadcaster, co-founder of the Communications Clinic and former chairman of the RTE Authority
- John David Scalamonti - former diocesan priest, converted to Orthodox Judaism.
- Hans Schlaffer – German former diocesan
- Paul Shanley – American former priest of the Archdiocese of Boston who was laicized after being convicted a raping a young boy
- James Siemens - British/Canadian academic and former priest of the Ukrainian Catholic Eparchy of the Holy Family of London, a diocese of the Ukrainian Greek Catholic Church in the United Kingdom. Excommunicated for converting to the Orthodox Church and becoming a priest of the Archdiocese of Russian Orthodox Churches in Western Europe in 2020.
- Nokë Sinishtaj – Albanian/Montenegrin poet and translator; left the diocesan priesthood in the 1970s
- Richard Sipe - former Benedictine monk ordained in 1959 and voluntarily left the priesthood in 1970 to marry former Benedictine nun Marianne Benkert.
- Edward J. Sponga – American former Jesuit priest and the 16th President of the University of Scranton; left the Jesuits in 1968 to marry a divorced woman, thus incurring automatic excommunication
- George Augustus Stallings, Jr. – American former diocesan priest; excommunicated in 1990 after publicly breaking with the Catholic Church and founding the Imani Temple African-American Catholic Congregation

== T ==
- Romy Tiongco – Filipino politician, activist, charity worker, and former diocesan priest
- Jean-Marie Tjibaou – New Caledonian politician and former diocesan priest; left the priesthood around 1977 to run for mayor of Hienghène

== V ==
- Joris Vercammen – Belgian former diocesan priest; converted to the Old Catholic Church of the Netherlands in 1988 and later became a bishop
- Géza Vermes - world-renowned historical Jesus research scholar, Hebraist and historian of religion, best known for being an eminent translator of the Dead Sea Scrolls; a former Roman Catholic priest of Jewish descent, he rediscovered his Jewish roots, abandoned Christianity and converted to Liberal Judaism.
- Tomislav Vlašić – Bosnian former Franciscan friar laicized in 2009 amidst accusations of sexual misconduct
- Heinrich Voes – Belgian former Augustinian monk who was martyred for adopting Lutheran beliefs

== W ==
- Józef Wesołowski – former Polish bishop; laicized in 2014 while on ecclesiastical trial for child sexual abuse and possession of child pornography
- Richard Williamson – English Traditionalist Catholic bishop and former priest of the Society of St. Pius X before being expelled in 2012 for offenses including his repeated calls for the deposition of Bishop Bernard Fellay as the Superior General of the SSPX and his refusal to stop publishing his weekly email which often included his many controversial views
- Finbar Wright – Irish musician and member of The Irish Tenors; was ordained a diocesan priest in 1978 before leaving the priesthood and becoming laicized in 1987, citing philosophical differences with the Catholic Church

== Y ==
- Fulbert Youlou – first President of the Republic of the Congo from 1960–1963; was a priest until the early 1950s when he married multiple women and became involved in politics

== Z ==
- Huldrych Zwingli – Swiss leader of the Protestant Reformation in Switzerland and founder of the Swiss Reformed Church; ordained a diocesan priest in 1506, but left the Catholic Church and accepted a position as pastor at the Grossmünster, a Protestant church, in 1518

== See also ==
- List of former Roman Catholic nuns
- List of former Roman Catholic brothers
- Jewish pope Andreas, a Jewish legend about a Jewish boy in the Middle Ages from the German town of Mainz who is kidnaped while asleep, told his parents had died, converts to Catholicism, becomes a priest and is elected Pope but then engineers a meeting with Mainz Jews, discovers his rabbi father is still alive when he appears, before admitting to his father that he is his long-lost son, abdicates from the papacy, converts back to Judaism and moves back to Mainz.
