= Jaume Traserra Cunillera =

Spanish Roman Catholic bishop (1934–2019)

Jaume Traserra i Cunillera
- Bishop of Solsona
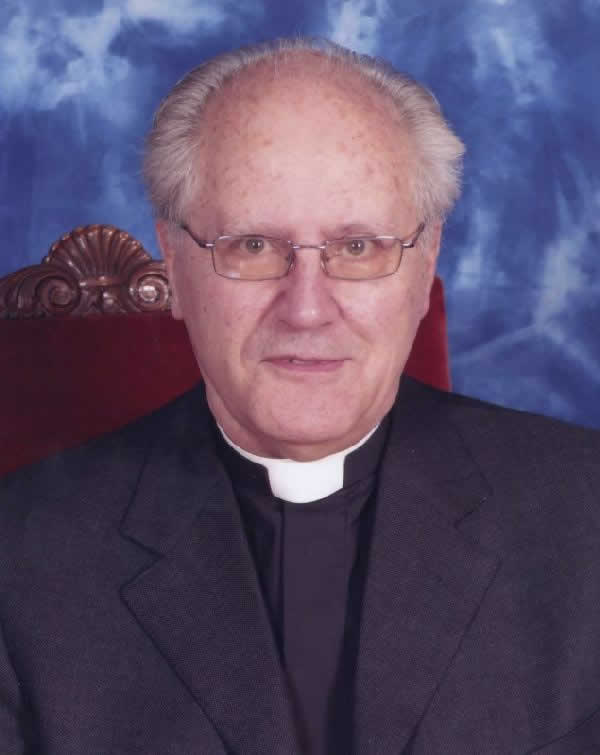
- Church: Catholic Church
- Diocese: Diocese of Solsona
- In office: 28 July 2001 – 3 November 2010
- Predecessor: Antoni Deig i Clotet
- Successor: Xavier Novell
- Previous posts: Titular Bishop of Selemselae (1993-2001); Auxiliary Bishop of Barcelona (1993-2001)

Orders
- Ordination: 19 March 1959
- Consecration: 5 September 1993 by Ricardo María Carles Gordó

Personal details
- Born: 11 July 1934 Granollers, Catalonia, Spanish Republic
- Died: 25 January 2019 (aged 84) Granollers, Catalonia, Spain

Jaume Traserra i Cunillera (11 July 1934 – 25 January 2019) was a Spanish Roman Catholic bishop.

Traserra Cunillera was born in Spain and was ordained to the priesthood in 1959. He served as titular bishop of Selemselæ and auxiliary bishop of the Roman Catholic Archdiocese of Barcelona, Spain, from 1993 to 2001. He then served as bishop of the Roman Catholic Diocese of Solsona from 2001 to 2010.
