= Grafton K. Mintz =

- Born: October 22, 1925; Milwaukee, Wisconsin
- Died: May 22, 1983; Seoul, South Korea
- Spouse: Barbara R. Mintz

Grafton K. Mintz (1925–1983) was an American copy editor who lived in Korea.

Born in Milwaukee, Wisconsin on October 22, 1925, he graduated from Bucknell University and obtained a M.A. in English at Ohio State University in 1953. Grafton and his wife Barbara come to Korea in 1962 on a Fulbright grant to teach in Pusan at Pusan National University. In 1970, he started working as an editor at the Korea Times and also did some English language book editing. He is known for editing Ha Tae-Hung's English version of Samguk Yusa and Han Woo-keun's The History of Korea. He died in Korea in 1983 and is interred at Yanghwajin Foreigners' Cemetery in Seoul.

Although sometimes he is credited with the translation of Samguk Yusa, the actual translation was done by Professor Ha Tae-Hung. Despite some claims that he was the first Westerner ever to become a naturalized citizen of the Republic of Korea, in actuality, Grafton never changed his nationality. The claim actually goes to Father Kenneth E. Killoren, a former Jesuit priest.
