= Paolo Lunardon =

Abbot of Saint Paul Outside the Walls from 1997–2005

- Born: Pietro Lunardon; 25 May 1930; Cuasso al Monte, Italy
- Died: 11 October 2017 (aged 87); Abbey of Pontida, Italy
- Occupation: Monk

Paolo Lunardon OSB (25 May 1930 – 11 October 2017), was an Italian catholic clergyman, who became Abbot of San Paolo fuori le Mura.

== Biography ==
Born in Cuasso al Monte, he entered the Order of Saint Benedict of the San Giacomo Abbey in Pontida in 1944 and received the religious name of Paolo. After his novitiate at the Abbey of Cava dei Tirreni in Salerno, he made his vows on November 4, 1952. On July 8, 1956, he received the ordination of priests at the Abbey of Montecassino.

Lunardon studied philosophy and theology at the Pontifical Atheneum of St. Anselm, the religious school of the Benedictine Order in Rome. He graduated from the "Vatican School of Paleography, Diplomacy and Archives " (Scuola Vaticana di Paleografia, Diplomatica e Archivistica). In 1971, he received a degree in history and philosophy from the Catholic University of Milan. Lunardon was a professor and director in public schools.

In the Abbey of Montecassino, he was archivist, master novice and claustral prior. He was prior of the monastery of San Pietro d'Assisi and pastor of the parish. Pope John Paul II appointed him on November 16, 1992 as Apostolic Administrator of the Territorial Badia di Cava.

On July 25, 1997 Paolo Lunardon was chosen as Abbot of San Paolo fuori le Mura. On April 1, 2005, Pope John Paul II accepted his resignation. He was the last territorial abbot of the territorial abbey of San Paolo fuori le Mura.

Paolo Lunardon died in Abbey of Sain Giacomo, in Pontida at the age of 87 on 11 October 2017.
