= List of former Catholic brothers =

This is a list of notable former Catholic religious brothers:

- Rick Curry (1943–2015) – American Jesuit known for his theatre ministry for the physically disabled; was a brother for 47 years before being ordained a priest in 2009
- Fabian Fucan (c. 1565–1621) – Japanese Catholic convert and Jesuit brother who reverted to Zen Buddhism and became a critic of Christianity
- Justo Gallego Martínez (1925–2021) – Spanish man known for constructing a church on his own from 1961 until his death; was a Trappist novice until leaving in 1961 after contracting tuberculosis
- William Jay Gaynor (1849–1913) – American politician and mayor of New York City from 1910 to 1913; was a De La Salle Brother for four years in the 1860s
- John Philip Holland (1841–1914) – Irish marine engineer and inventor of the modern submarine; was a member of the Congregation of Christian Brothers before leaving in 1873 due to ill health
- Gabriel Moran (1935–2021) – American theologian and religious educator; was a De La Salle Brother before leaving in 1985
- Semakula Mulumba (1913–?) – Ugandan anti-colonial activist and politician; was a member of the Bannakaroli Brothers before leaving the Church and becoming a critic of Christianity
- Godfrey Reggio (born 1940) – American filmmaker; was a De La Salle Brother for 14 years before leaving in 1968
- Trinidad Sanchez Jr. (1943–2006) – American poet and activist; was a Jesuit brother for 27 years

== See also ==
- List of former Catholic priests
- List of former Roman Catholic nuns
