= Kirsten Stoffregen Pedersen =

Danish nun and religious researcher

Kirsten Stoffregen Pedersen (26 February 1932 – 30 May 2017), widely known as Sister Abraham and in Denmark as Søster Abraham, was a Danish nun, religious researcher and teacher. After becoming a Catholic nun in Sweden in the 1950s, she returned to study in Copenhagen but moved to Israel in 1965. After years of further study at the Hebrew University of Jerusalem, she earned a doctorate in 1991. In addition to her extensive understanding of theology, especially the history of the Ethiopian Orthodox Church, she is remembered for her interest in iconography and for guiding pilgrims through the streets of Jerusalem.

== Biography ==
Born in the Copenhagen district of Valby, Kirsten Stoffregen Pedersen was brought up in a Lutheran home where her father took a special interest in the Christian youth organization, Frivilligt Drenge- og Pige-Forbund. She attended N. Zahle's School (1937–1948) and Østersøgades Gymnasium, where she specialized in Latin and Greek, matriculating in 1951. From the age of 12, she regularly attended Roman Catholic services, converting to Catholicism when she was 18. On completing her school education, she moved to Vadstena, Sweden, where she became a Bridgettine nun.

In 1962, together with several other sisters, she left the convent although she continued to be a nun. She was not happy with the patriarchal management of the Catholic Church, believing that women should be treated on an equal basis.

After making a three-month pilgrimage to the Holy Land in the summer of 1964, she returned the following year to study Sacred Scripture and Hebrew Literature at the Hebrew University of Jerusalem, graduating in 1969. In Jerusalem, she settled in a small hut on the Mount of Olives, but always welcomed those who visited her. It was her belief that all Christians had a part to play in the Holy Land.

From 1970, Stoffregen-Pedersen was instrumental in reviving research and studies in Ge'ez, the language of the Ethiopian Orthodox Tewahedo Church, both in Jerusalem and abroad. She taught the history of the church and Ethiopian iconography. In 1975, she resumed her studies at the Hebrew University, earning an M.A. in African Studies in 1981 with a thesis titled "The History of the Ethiopian Community in the Holy Land from the Time of Emperor Tewodros II till 1974". In 1984, she embarked on Ph.D. courses, receiving her doctorate in 1991 with the thesis "Traditional Ethiopian Exegesis of the Book of Psalms". Among the works to which she contributed is the Encylclopaedia Aethiopica.

Sister Abraham intended to die in the Holy Land but in 2014 was obliged to return to Denmark as a result of deteriorating health. She spent her last years in a home in Næstved close to her brother's home. After suffering from dementia, she died on 30 May 2017.
