= Joanna Manning =

Joanna Manning (born 1943) is a feminist activist, Anglican priest, and former Roman Catholic nun, who is currently living in Canada. Originally from Britain, she joined the Society of the Holy Child Jesus and studied medieval history before leaving the religious life and marrying in 1970. She then moved to Toronto and taught. She became a principal.

Manning eventually grew dissatisfied with the teachings of her church and sought to reform its patriarchal system from within, something which provoked the ire of the Archbishop of Toronto. She has written a number of books about her demands for reform and has written for local Toronto newspapers on the topic. Following the election of Pope Benedict XVI, Manning was received into the Anglican Church of Canada in which she was ordained a deacon on 1 May 2011 by Colin Johnson and a priest on 27 November 2011. In 2012 she was a part-time associate priest at All Saints Sherbourne Church-Community Centre in Toronto.

== Writings ==
- Is the Pope Catholic? A Woman Confronts Her Church (1999)
- Take Back the Truth: Confronting Papal Power and the Religious Right (2002)
- The Magdalene Moment (2006)
