= Maria Agnès Ribera Garau =

Spanish writer and former nun

- Born: 1790; Palma, Spain
- Died: 1861 (aged 70–71); Palma, Spain
- Occupations: Nun, writer
- Writing career
- Language: Spanish

Maria Agnès Ribera Garau (Palma, 1790 - Palma, 1861) was a Spanish writer, liberal and former nun from Majorca.

== Life ==
Born illegitimate, she was the only child of Jerome Ignacio Ribera, heir to a wealthy merchant family. Since her birth, the family orchestrated a conspiracy to steal her inheritance and her life, by forcing Ribera to become a nun. In 1806, her father decided that his 11-year-old daughter should go to a convent, explicitly against her will. In 1820, she managed to leave the convent, protected by the law of secularization. But with the return of religious absolutism, the family and the church conspired for Ribera to return to the convent. She went into exile in France and began a long process to cancel her family and the church's power over her. After fighting against the heirs who wanted her inheritance, and being imprisoned in Madrid, the Holy See gave Ribera her freedom and had her vows annulled when her case was heard by the Vatican Court. She then married her former lover and devoted herself to writing books. Ribera left many unpublished manuscripts, including an 1833 book, which was the first known travel book written by a woman in Mallorca, and probably in Spain. In addition to her writing, she supported liberal views and promoted women's education.

== Selected works ==
- Medios poderosos para la perfecta enmienda de la vida o entera y durable conversión. Opúsculo entresacado de los venerables escritos del glorioso Obispo San Francisco de Sales; con otros varios ejercicios conducentes a asegurar la salvación etern (1847)
- Viage que yo María Inés Ribera y Garau hice á Valencia, Madrid, Roma y otras capitales extrangeras, y noticia de los monumentos, maravillas y curiosidades que observé en ellas (manuscrit, 1833)
