= Michele Birch Conery =

Michele Birch Conery is one of four women who claim to have been ordained to the priesthood of the Catholic Church on 25 July 2005, against the wishes of ecclesiastical authorities.

A further five women chose to be ordained as deacons at that time. The ceremony took place aboard a boat on the border between U.S. and Canadian waters in order to avoid the jurisdiction of any particular archdiocese. They were ordained by women who had been ordained in 2002 by a bishop on the Danube River, between Germany and Austria. The Roman Catholic Church does not consider that an ordination has taken place.

In addition to the women, nearly five hundred spectators were present at the event, having purchased seats in advance. Conery is a former nun from British Columbia who teaches feminist literary analysis at North Island College on Vancouver Island.

== See also ==
- Ordination of women
- Ordination of women and the Catholic Church
