= Xavier Novell =

Spanish prelate

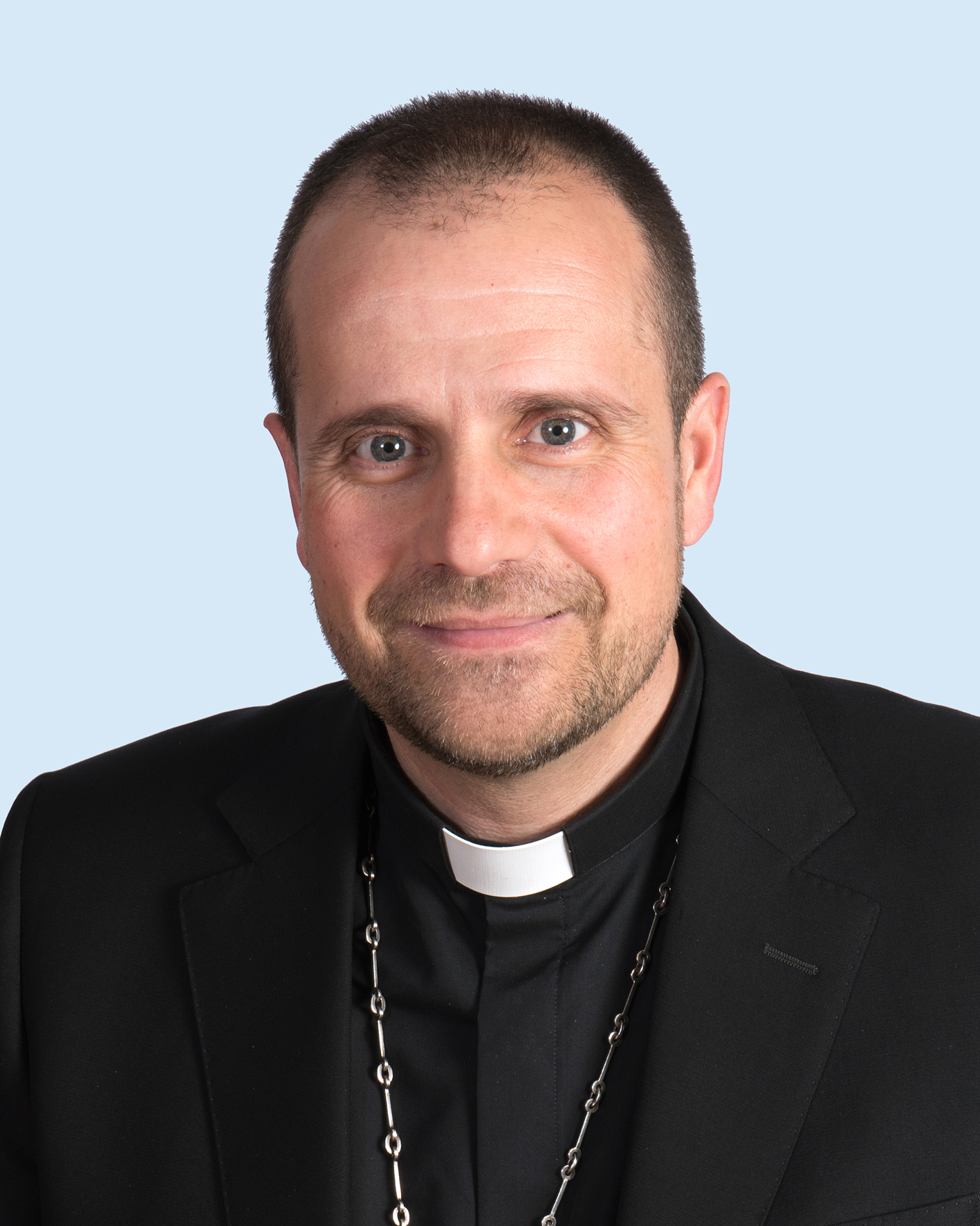
- Church: Catholic
- Previous post: Bishop of Solsona (2010-2021)

Orders
- Ordination: 1997
- Consecration: December 12, 2010

Personal details
- Born: Xavier Novell i Gomà; 20 April 1969 (age 57) Province of Lleida, Spain
- Spouse: Silvia Caballol y Clemente (m. 2021)
- Children: 2
- Education: University of Lleida; Pontifical Gregorian University

Xavier Novell i Gomà (born 20 April 1969) is a Spanish former bishop of the Catholic Church, who left the priesthood to marry Silvia Caballol y Clemente on 22 November 2021. He gained notoriety when it was discovered Caballol was an author of Satanic erotic literature.

== Early life and education ==
Novell was born on 20 April 1969 in the province of Lleida. He attended the University of Lleida, where he earned a degree in agricultural technical engineering. In 1997, he earned a bachelor's degree in theology from the Pontifical Gregorian University, and was ordained. He then earned a doctorate from the Pontifical Gregorian University in 2004.

== Priesthood ==
He was appointed to the Diocese of Solsona in Catalonia in 2010, becoming Spain's youngest bishop at the age of 41. As Bishop of Solsona, he was reportedly involved in Conversion therapy for homosexuals, compared abortion to “genocide”, and supported Catalan regional independence.

== Resignation and later life ==
He announced his resignation from the diocese on 23 August 2021, citing “personal reasons.” In December 2021, the Spanish Episcopal Conference issued a statement referring to Novell as “Bishop Emeritus of Solsona”, adding that he retains his title but is forbidden by canon law from “exercising any of the rights and duties inherent to the episcopal office”, such as administering the sacraments or engaging “in any teaching activity, whether public or private.” That same month, The Guardian reported Novell as “working for a company,” Semen Cardona, “that extracts and sells pig semen.”

His wife, Caballol (born 1983), is a divorced mother of two who was a clinical psychologist who quit the profession to become, as her publisher describes, “a dynamic and transgressive author who’s made her mark on the thorny world of literature by turning all our moral and ethical questions upside down”. One of her novels, The Hell of Gabriel's Lust, has been noted by the Catholic News Agency and International Business Times as having “Satanic overtones”. They have two children together.

== See also ==
- List of former Catholic priests
