= Giovanni Franzoni =

Italian theologian (1928–2017)

- Born: Giovanni Battista Franzoni; 8 November 1928; Varna, Bulgaria
- Died: 13 July 2017 (aged 88); Canneto Sabino, Fara in Sabina, Italy
- Political party: Italian Communist Party
- Movement: Christian communism

Ecclesiastical career
- Religion: Christianity (Roman Catholic)
- Church: Latin Church
- Ordained: 25 January 1955
- Laicized: 4 August 1976
- Offices held: Abbot of St. Paul's Outside the Walls (1964–1973)

Giovanni Battista Franzoni (8 November 1928 – 13 July 2017) was an Italian Christian communist and dissident theologian. A former Benedictine, he was Abbot of St. Paul's Outside the Walls from 1964 to 1973. Having become involved in activism and politics, he was laicized by Pope Paul VI in 1976.

== Biography ==
Franzoni was an Italian born in Varna, Bulgaria. He professed as a Benedictine monk of the Abbey of St. Paul Outside the Walls on 5 July 1951. He was ordained to the priesthood on 25 January 1955 and, at the young age of 35, was elected abbot in 1964. He was the author of numerous theological works.

An abbot at St. Paul's Outside the Walls, a papal basilica, he was defrocked by Pope Paul VI after he supported Italian legislation legalizing divorce and abortion. He was also vocal about voting for the Italian Communist Party in 1976 Italian general election. Franzoni had officially joined Italy's Communist Party in June of that year.

Franzoni was a longtime peace activist, having stood against the United States' armed involvements in Vietnam and Iraq.

Franzoni opposed the initiated beatification process for Pope John Paul II. In 2005, Franzoni joined ten other theologians to appeal to Catholics critical of the canonization process to voice their concerns.

He was married to Yukiko Ueno, a Japanese pedagogist.

== Works ==
In Italian:

- La terra è di Dio (1973)
- Omelie a S. Paolo fuori le mura (1974)
- Il posto della fede (1977)
- Il diavolo mio fratello (1986)
- Le tentazioni di Cristo (1990)
- La solitudine del samaritano (1993)
- Farete riposare la terra (1996)
- Giobbe, l'ultima tentazione (1998)
- Lo strappo nel cielo di carta (1999)
- Anche il cielo è di Dio (2000)
- Ofelia e le altre (2001)
- La morte condivisa (2002)
- Del rigore e della misericordia (2005)
