= Kenneth E. Killoren =

- Born: Wisconsin
- Died: South Korea
- Spouse: Joanne Lee(1945-2022, m. 1968)

Kenneth E. Killoren (1919-1988) was a Jesuit priest who lived in Korea and the first president of Sogang University.

He came to Korea in 1955 with Arthur Dethlefs, another Jesuit priest from Wisconsin. Killoren became the first president Sogang University in February 1960. He was also a contributing writer to the Korea Journal. He was the first naturalized citizen of Korea.

== See also ==
- Jesuit
- Sogang University
