= List of people from Hawaii =

State flag of Hawaii

Location of Hawaii in the United States

Hawaii has been home to many notable people who have become well-known beyond the shores of the islands. Listed below are notable people who have called Hawaii home during some significant part of their lives.

== A ==
- Isabella Abbott, educator, phycologist, and ethnobotanist
- Brian Adams (1963–2007), professional wrestler; born in Kona
- Eddie Aikau, professional surfer
- Benny Agbayani, professional baseball player, born in Honolulu
- Keiko Agena, actress
- Daniel Akaka, first U.S. senator with Hawaiian ancestry
- Akebono Tarō (born Chad Rowan), sumo wrestler, born in Waimanalo
- Dennis Alexio, former World Kickboxing Champion, lived and fought out of Honolulu
- Robert Allerton, industrialist and patron-owner of Allerton Garden, Kauai
- Tyson Alualu, professional football player, born in Honolulu
- Chang Apana, folk figure who inspired Charlie Chan; worked for the Honolulu Police Department
- S. Haunani Apoliona, Office of Hawaiian Affairs trustee, chairperson of OHA Board of Trustees

== B ==
- Buck Baker or Dr. William Baker, conductor
- Bob Ballard, discoverer of Titanic wreck, received degree from the University of Hawaiʻi
- Kimee Balmilero, Filipino-American, Broadway actor, Miss Saigon, Mamma Mia, Hi-5
- Gabe Baltazar, Filipino saxophone player
- Danny Barcelona, Filipino-American jazz-band drummer for Louis Armstrong
- Roseanne Barr, actress in Roseanne, macadamia nut farmer and activist
- Sasha Barrese, actress
- Chris Barron (1968), vocalist with Spin Doctors, born at Pearl Harbor
- Donn Beach, restaurateur of Don the Beachcomber tiki restaurant, died in Honolulu
- Greg Beeman, director-producer
- Larry Beil, journalist, graduated from the University of Hawaiʻi at Mānoa
- Barbi Benton, model/actress, has a home in Hawaii
- Henri Berger, composer and royal bandmaster of the Kingdom of Hawaii
- Daniel Bess, actor, Rick Allen on 24
- Henry Bianchini, Hawaiian-based sculptor, painter and printmaker
- Ashley Bickerton, contemporary artist, painter, sculptor
- Hiram Bingham I, missionary
- Hiram Bingham II, missionary
- Hiram Bingham III, U.S. senator from Connecticut, discovered Machu Picchu
- Bernice Pauahi Bishop, Hawaiian princess and philanthropist
- Charles Reed Bishop, banker, philanthropist, husband of Bernice Pauahi Bishop
- Bill Bixby, actor/director; had residence in Hawaii
- Don Blanding, poet
- Daryl Bonilla, Hawaii-based actor, born in Honolulu
- Richard Boone, actor, who lived in Hawaii for seven years
- Robert Sidney Bowen, author, died of cancer in Honolulu in 1977
- Bradajo, poet known for writing in Hawaiian Pidgin
- Beau Bridges, actor, attended University of Hawaiʻi at Mānoa
- Darin Brooks, actor on Days of Our Lives
- Jason Brooks, actor, splits time between Hawaii and Los Angeles
- Andy Bumatai, Hawaii-based comedian and actor
- Ray Bumatai, Hawaii-based actor and producer, died in Honolulu
- Redmond Burke, pediatric heart surgeon
- John A. Burns, second governor of Hawaii, 1962–1974, interred at National Memorial Cemetery of the Pacific in Honolulu
- Eric Byler, director of Charlotte Sometimes and Americanese, attended Moanalua High School, Honolulu

== C ==
- William Robert Caddy, World War II Medal of Honor recipient, interred at National Memorial Cemetery of the Pacific in Honolulu
- Daryl Cagle, editorial cartoonist
- Sarah Wayne Callies, actress
- James Campbell, founder of the Estate of James Campbell, a major landowner in Hawaii
- Joseph Campbell, author, lived and died in Honolulu
- George Ham Cannon, World War II Medal of Honor recipient
- Glenn Cannon, actor, co-director of the Cinematic and Digital Arts Program at the University of Hawaiʻi at Mānoa
- Tia Carrere, singer, actress
- Alexander Cartwright, father of American baseball
- Steve Case, former chairman and CEO of America Online
- Benjamin J. Cayetano, first Filipino-American governor
- Cedric Ceballos, basketball player, rap artist
- Byron Chamberlain, athlete, born in Honolulu
- Levi Chamberlain, missionary
- Michael Chamberlain, film director, current resident of Honolulu
- Richard Chamberlain, actor, current resident of Hawaii
- Wah Chang, Hollywood designer
- Ben Chapman, actor, longtime resident of Oahu, Hawaii
- Duane "DOG" Chapman, bounty hunter, has lived in Hawaii since 1989
- Charo, entertainer, longtime resident
- Tom Cheney, cartoonist
- Brian Ching, professional soccer (football) player for the US Men's National Team and Houston Dynamo, of Major League Soccer
- Herbert Choy, first Asian-American federal judge in U.S. history
- Sam Choy, chef
- Kam Fong Chun, police officer/actor
- Bryan Clay, Olympic athlete
- Archibald Cleghorn, father of Princess Victoria Kaʻiulani, and husband of Princess Miriam K. Likelike
- Princess Victoria Kaʻiulani Cleghorn, last Hawaiian princess
- Harlan Cleveland, DIKW
- Titus Coan, early missionary to Hawaii, founder of Haili Church
- Ed Cobb, singer, member of the group The Four Preps
- Scott Coffey, actor, born in Hawaii, studied in Honolulu
- Bruce Cooil, statistical modeler, born and raised in Honolulu
- Captain James Cook, British explorer, died at Kealakekua Bay
- Francis Judd Cooke, composer
- Gordon Cooper, astronaut, lived in Hawaii
- Mother Marianne Cope, the successor to Father Damien
- David Copperfield, illusionist, early career at Pagoda Hotel
- Matt Corboy, actor, born and raised in Honolulu
- Nancy Cordes, CBS News correspondent
- Ed Corney, IFBB Hall of Fame bodybuilder
- Buster Crabbe, athlete and actor, studied at the Punahou School in Honolulu
- John P. Craven PhD, JD, ocean engineering scientist, developer of OTEC and law professor
- Richard E. Cunha, cinematographer

== D ==
- Mark Dacascos, actor and martial artist, born in Honolulu
- Anthony Peter Damato, World War II Medal of Honor recipient
- Father Damien, priest, missionary to the Lepers of Molokai, beatified
- Ron Darling, MLB pitcher and broadcaster
- Gavan Daws, Shoal of Time author, Hawaiiana historian
- Frank Delima, comedian
- Richard Denning, actor, owned residence in Hawaii
- Martin Denny, composer
- Benjamin Dillingham, businessman
- Walter F. Dillingham, industrialist
- Jordan Dizon, NFL linebacker for Detroit Lions
- Jimmie Dodd, actor, died in Honolulu
- James Drummond Dole, pineapple magnate
- Sanford B. Dole, territorial governor
- Isami Doi, artist and printmaker
- Richard Donner, director, owns residence in Hawaii
- David Douglas, botanist, namesake of Douglas-fir tree
- Alex Dreier, television journalist and actor
- Doris Duke, heiress, owner of "Shangri-La" residence on Black Point
- Kamalani Dung, olympic medalist and professional softball pitcher
- Ann Dunham, mother of President Barack Obama
- Dyrus, real name Marcus Hill, professional League of Legends player

== E ==
- Jason Elam, NFL kicker, attended college in Hawaii
- Yvonne Elliman, singer
- Kate Elliott, science fiction and fantasy writer
- Kenny Endo, professional taiko player
- Georgia Engel, actress, attended college in Hawaii
- Jean Erdman, dancer, choreographer
- Neil Everett, ESPN sportcaster

== F ==
- Nuu Faaola, former NFL running back
- Mary Elizabeth Pruett Farrington, Republican congressional representative
- Scott Feldman, Major League Baseball pitcher (Houston Astros)
- Sid Fernandez, baseball pitcher, born in Honolulu
- Tony Fiammetta, fullback for the Chicago Bears
- Hiram Leong Fong, first Chinese-American U.S. senator from Hawaii, interred at Nuuanu Cemetery in Honolulu
- Khalil Fong, Chinese singer based in Hong Kong, lived until age 6 in Kauai
- Leo Ford, actor, operated Pacific Paradise Tours
- Russ Francis, NFL tight end, New England Patriots, San Francisco 49ers
- Herman Frazier, 1976 Olympic gold medalist, head of 2004 U.S. Olympic team
- Harry Fujiwara, professional wrestler, born in Hawaii

== G ==
- David Gallaher, writer of Green Lantern Corps, born in Honolulu
- Brickwood Galuteria, politician, elected chair of the Hawaii Democratic Party in 2004
- Sunny Garcia, pro surfer
- Loyal Garner, singer
- Brian Gaskill, actor, born in Honolulu
- Thomas Gill, lieutenant governor and U.S. representative
- Henry G. Ginaca, engineer and inventor of the machine that peeled and cored pineapples being prepared for canning
- Gary Goldman, producer, graduated from the University of Hawaiʻi in December 1971
- Ah Chew Goo, former coach of the University of Hawaiʻi men's basketball team and a star high school basketball player
- Kurt Gouveia, pro football player
- Lauren Graham, TV actress
- Wendy Lee Gramm, economist, wife of Phil Gramm
- Glen Grant, folklorist and author
- Erin Gray, actress
- Dave Guard, singer with Kingston Trio, born in Hawaii

== H ==
- Brian Haberlin, comic book artist, co-creator of Witchblade
- Marie Louise Habets, ex-nun on whose life The Nun's Story was based
- Lance Hahn, musician, co-founder of the prolific punk band J Church, born in Honolulu
- Bethany Hamilton, shark attack survivor, surfer
- Laird Hamilton, surfer, monster wave rider, inventor of tow-in surfing
- George Harrison, musician, former Beatle; had residence in Hawaii
- Kayo Hatta, film director
- Hilo Hattie, also known as Clara H. Nelson, Hawaiian entertainer, born in Honolulu
- Dick Haymes, actor, lived in Hawaii in 1953
- Michael Haynes III, professional wrestler, born in Honolulu
- Erik Hazelhoff Roelfzema, author, resident of Hawaii
- Christian Hedemann (1852–1932), Danish-born engineer and pioneering amateur photographer
- Cecil Heftel, United States representative and businessman
- George Helm, Kahoolawe Ohana activist
- Marie Helvin, top model of the 1970s and 1980s
- George Herbig, astronomer
- Harvey Hess, lyric poet, librettist
- Ryan Higa, YouTuber known by his YouTube username "nigahiga", born in Hilo
- John Hillerman, actor, best known for his role in Magnum, P.I.
- Barron Hilton, heir of Hilton Hotel chain, was stationed in Hawaii in World War II
- Dave Hlubek, lead guitarist and founding member of Molly Hatchet
- Coco Ho, professional surfer
- Don Ho, entertainer, born in Kakaako and died near Waikiki Beach
- Hoku Ho, singer
- Michael Rikio Ming Hee Ho, conceptual artist
- Michael Ho, professional surfer
- Michael Hoffman film director, born in Hawaii
- Max Holloway, Mixed Martial Arts (MMA) fighter, former Featherweight Champion
- Josh Holloway, actor on the television show Lost in Hawaii Kai, Honolulu
- Garrett Hongo, Japanese-American poet
- Mark Keali'i Ho'omalu, singer featured in Lilo & Stitch
- kuʻualoha hoʻomanawanui, Native Hawaiian author
- Robert T. Hoshibata, bishop of the United Methodist Church
- Christian Hosoi, professional skateboarder of Hawaiian descent
- Charlie Hough, MLB pitcher
- Victor Stewart Kaleoaloha Houston, United States representative from the Territory of Hawaii
- Kelly Hu, Miss Hawaii Teen USA 1985, Miss Teen USA 1985, Miss Hawaii USA 1993
- Huening Kai, K-pop singer-songwriter from Honolulu
- Matthias Hues, actor, moved to Hawaii
- Mike Huff, MLB outfielder
- Kathryn Hulme, author of The Nun's Story
- Wayne Hunter, offensive tackle for New York Jets

== I ==
- Curtis Iaukea, secretary of Foreign Affairs for the Kingdom of Hawaii
- Carrie Ann Inaba, actress, choreographer, judge on ABC's Dancing with the Stars and host of CBS' The Talk
- Enson Inoue, mixed martial artist
- Daniel K. Inouye, U.S. senator for Hawaii, 1963–2012
- Andy Irons, surfer
- Yuna Ito, Japanese pop singer from Honolulu

== J ==
- Thomas Jaggar, geologist and founder of the Hawaiian Volcano Observatory
- William Paul Jarrett, United States representative from the Territory of Hawaii
- Arthur Johnsen, artist and painter of Hawaiiana
- Jack Johnson, singer-songwriter, musician, and documentary filmmaker, born in Oahu
- Lia Marie Johnson, actress, singer, guitarist, born in Wahiawa, Hawaii
- Daniel Jones, member of rock & roll band 7th Order, grew up in Honolulu
- Cris Judd, actor, partly raised in Hawaii
- Gerrit P. Judd, missionary and advisor

== K ==
Ka–Kg

- Kaʻahumanu, Hawaiian queen
- Duke Paoa Kahanamoku, three-time Olympic gold medalist (swimming), surfer, born and died in Honolulu, interred at Oahu Cemetery in Honolulu
- Carole Kai, singer and philanthropist
- Natasha Kai, former US WNT soccer player, for Philadelphia Independence, born in Kahuku, Hawaii
- Henry J. Kaiser, industrialist
- Victoria Kaiulani, Hawaiian princess, interred at Royal Mausoleum in Honolulu
- David Kalākaua, king, interred at Royal Mausoleum in Honolulu
- Jonah Kuhio Kalanianaole, prince of Hawaii
- Harry Kalas, sportscaster, broadcast Hawaii Islanders
- Emma Kaleleonalani, Hawaiian monarch
- Israel Kamakawiwo‘ole, entertainer and singer
- Stacy Kamano, actress
- Kamehameha I, monarch who united the Hawaiian islands, interred at Royal Mausoleum in Honolulu
- Kamehameha V, last of the House of Kamehameha
- Lisa Linn Kanae, poet and professor of English
- Edith Kanakaʻole, dancer, chanter, teacher, and kumu hula
- Herb Kawainui Kāne, artist, historian, and cofounder of the Polynesian Voyaging Society
- Chiefess Kapiolani, Hawaiian aliʻi
- Queen Kapiolani, Hawaiian queen
- Gilbert Lani Kauhi, actor
- Kaumualii, last king of Kauai
- Guy Kawasaki, official Apple Computer evangelist
- Princess Ruth Keelikolani, princess of the Kingdom of Hawaii, largest landowner in Hawaii
- Klaus Keil, geologist, known for mineral keilite
- Rabbit Kekai, professional surfer whose mentor was Duke Kahanamoku, born in Honolulu, teaches surfing in Waikiki Beach
- Ma'ake Kemoeatu, defensive tackle for the Baltimore Ravens
- Douglas Kennedy, actor, died in Honolulu, interred at National Memorial Cemetery of the Pacific in Honolulu
- Keala Kennelly, professional surfer and actress, John from Cincinnati, Blue Crush, Step into Liquid
- Douglas Kenney, actor, died in Kauai
- Ed Kenney, actor and singer
- Steven L. Kent, novelist, raised in Honolulu, attended Kalani High School

Ki–Kz

- Isaac C. Kidd, World War II Medal of Honor recipient, died in Pearl Harbor, interred at USS Arizona Memorial
- Nicole Kidman, Australian actress, born in Honolulu
- Hau'oli Kikaha, linebacker for the New Orleans Saints
- Daniel Dae Kim, actor with roles in Lost and Hawaii Five-0
- Jason Kincaid, professional wrestler, born in Honolulu
- Harry Kim, first Korean-American elected mayor in US
- Rebekah Kim, Korean-American singer and former member of South Korean girl group After School
- Ricky Kim, Korean-American model and actor
- Darren Kimura, businessman, born in Hilo, attended Waiakea High School
- Samuel Wilder King, governor of the Territory of Hawaii and United States representative from the Territory of Hawaii
- Robert Kiyosaki, author of financial books
- Terence Knapp, actor and director, lives in Honolulu
- Konishiki (born Salevaa Atisanoe), sumo wrestler
- Glen Kozlowski, NFL wide receiver
- Olin Kreutz, NFL center
- Shogo Kubo, professional skater, lives with his family in Oahu
- Kūkahi, musician, born in Honolulu
- Clyde Kusatsu, actor, born in Honolulu, attended Iolani High School

== L ==
- Travis LaBoy, linebacker for San Diego Chargers
- Bu Laia, comedian
- Mike Lambert, USA national volleyball team, AVP MVP
- George Parsons Lathrop, journalist, poet
- Alfred Laureta, jurist, first U.S. federal judge of Filipino ancestry
- Shawn Lauvao, guard for Washington Redskins
- Vicki Lawrence, actress, entertainer, lived in Maui for a time after the Carol Burnett Show
- Brook Mahealani Lee, Miss Hawaii USA 1997, Miss USA 1997, Miss Universe 1997
- Chris Lee, executive of TriStar Pictures, chairman of Academy for Creative Media for University of Hawaiʻi
- Jason Scott Lee, actor of Hawaiian descent, graduate of Pearl City High School
- Kui Lee, born Kuiokalani Lee, musician, composer of "I'll Remember You" sung by Don Ho, Elvis Presley and Andy Williams
- Liliuokalani (1838–1917), queen of Hawaii 1891–1893; last Hawaiian monarch
- Charles Lindbergh, iconic aviator, lived and died on Maui
- Linda Lingle, governor of Hawaii 2002–10; born in Missouri
- Susanna Lo, screenwriter, director and producer, graduate and student body president of Star of the Sea High School
- Phil Loadholt, offensive tackle for the Minnesota Vikings
- Oren Ethelbirt Long, first governor of Hawaii, interred at Oahu Cemetery in Honolulu
- Tai Sing Loo, photographer, born in Hawaii
- Gerry López, professional surfer, born in Hawaii
- Jack Lord, actor, star of Hawaii Five-O, died in Honolulu
- Edward Tsang Lu, astronaut
- Agnes Lum, bikini supermodel popular in Japan, born in Honolulu
- Mike Lum, MLB outfielder
- King Lunalilo, king of Hawaii January 8, 1873 – February 3, 1874
- Rod Lurie, film director, spent part of his childhood in Hawaii
- Arthur Lyman, musician
- Ben Lyon, actor, died in Honolulu
- Lorenzo Lyons, minister and author of the beloved hymn "Hawai`i Aloha"

== M ==
- Chris Fuamatu-Ma'afala, football player
- Kenneth MacDonald, British actor
- Gardner McKay, actor/writer, died in Honolulu
- Kaluka Maiava, linebacker for the Cleveland Browns
- Peter Maivia, professional wrestler
- Eduardo Malapit (1933–2007), first U.S. mayor of Filipino ancestry
- Larry Manetti, actor, best known for Magnum, P.I.
- Vince Manuwai, football player
- Ferdinand Marcos, former Philippine president, lived and died in exile in Honolulu
- Marcus Mariota, NFL quarterback, 2014 Heisman Trophy winner
- Markiplier, real name Mark Fischbach, YouTuber and Let's Player, born in O'ahu but raised in Cincinnati, Ohio
- Bruno Mars, stage name of Peter Hernandez, singer-songwriter and music producer
- Francis A. Marzen, religious leader
- Thalia Massie, wife of a Navy lieutenant, from the publicized 1931 rape case
- Josh Mauga, linebacker for the Kansas City Chiefs
- Kevin McCollum, producer, graduated from Punahou School in Honolulu
- Glenn Medeiros, singer-songwriter
- melody. (Melody Miyuki Ishikawa), singer of J-pop music
- James Mercer, lead singer and guitarist of indie rock band The Shins
- W.S. Merwin, poet, longtime resident of Maui
- Stein Metzger, beach volleyball player and Olympian
- James A. Michener, novelist, wrote about Hawaii
- Al Michaels, sports broadcaster, began his sports broadcasting career in Hawaii in 1968
- Bette Midler, actress and entertainer, graduate of A.W. Radford High School
- Patsy Takemoto Mink, United States Congresswoman and author of the Title IX Amendment to the Higher Education Act
- Tau Moe, singer, died in Laie, Hawaii
- Tom Moffatt, entertainment producer, former DJ with KPOI
- Jason Momoa, actor and model, born in Honolulu
- Darius A. Monsef IV, internet entrepreneur and philanthropist
- Carissa Moore, professional surfer
- Joe Moore, actor and journalist based in Honolulu
- Scott Moore, screenwriter
- Jon Moritsugu, film director, born in Honolulu
- Jim Morrison, lawyer, helicopter pilot, lived in Hawaii
- Roger E. Mosley, actor, best known for his role in Magnum, P.I.
- Tahj Mowry, actor, born in Honolulu
- Don Muraco, professional wrestler, born in Pūpūkea, Hawaii
- Arthur Murray, entertainer, died in Honolulu
- Musashimaru (born Fiamalu Penitani), sumo wrestler

== N ==
- Jim Nabors, actor and singer
- Linda Nagata, novelist
- Kellye Nakahara, actor
- Lane Nishikawa, actor, director, performance artist
- Al Noga, pro football player
- Jordan Norwood, pro football player

== O ==
- Barack Obama, 44th president of the United States, born in Honolulu (August 4, 1961)
- Kimo von Oelhoffen, football player
- Bobo Olson, world champion boxer, hall of famer
- Eileen Olszewski, professional female boxer
- Timothy Olyphant, actor
- Danny Ongais, racecar driver
- Ellison Onizuka, astronaut
- Chad Owens, professional football player
- Yukio Ozaki, Japanese-born ceramicist, wood sculptor, teacher

== P ==
- Gabby Pahinui, musician
- Grace Park, actress
- Janel Parrish, actress
- Richard Parsons, Time-Warner CEO
- William S. Patout, III, sugar grower in Iberia Parish; lived in Honolulu in the 1960s
- William A. Patterson, United Airlines president, 1934–1966
- Kalani Pe'a, singer-songwriter
- B.J. Penn, professional mixed martial artist
- Jeff Peterson, slack key guitarist
- Rick Pitino, basketball coach; began career in Hawaii
- Gregory Poirier, writer, director, producer
- Troy Polamalu, professional football player
- Kawaipuna Prejean, Hawaiian activist
- Kelly Preston, actress
- Albert Pyun, film director

== Q ==
- Maggie Q (born Maggie Denise Quigley), actress, model
- Maria Quiban, weather anchor for KTTV-TV in Los Angeles

== R ==
- Dale Radomski, stuntman
- Dominic Raiola, football player
- Larry Ramos, actor, The King and I; entertainer and singer with The New Christy Minstrels, and the Association; born on Kauai
- Jonah Ray, actor, comedian
- Kealii Reichel (born 1961), Hawaiian singer, dancer, chanter and scholar
- Syngman Rhee, first president of South Korea, later exiled to Hawaii
- James O. Richardson, commander in chief, U.S. Pacific Fleet 1940–1941 at Pearl Harbor, Hawaii
- Malea Rose actor, writer, producer, founder of skincare company
- Eric Roberts, actor, resident
- Red Rocha, basketball player, coach
- George Rodiek, diplomat and Hindu-German conspirator, built Walker Estate
- Makua Rothman (born 1984), world champion surfer
- Anthony Ruivivar, actor, Third Watch
- Robert Rusler, actor, Babylon 5
- Peggy Ryan, dancer and choreographer

== S ==
- Buffy Sainte-Marie, singer, Academy Award-winning songwriter, educator and activist, lives on Kauai
- Stan Sakai, comic book creator
- Harold Sakata, Olympic medalist and actor, Goldfinger
- Lenn Sakata, baseball player
- Carolyn Sapp, Miss America 1992
- Bronson Sardinha, baseball player
- Garret T. Sato, actor
- Nicole Scherzinger, dancer-singer, The Pussycat Dolls
- Amanda Schull, ballerina and actress
- Tom Selleck, actor; lived in Hawaii during Magnum, P.I.
- Shag, real name Josh Agle, artist
- Bob Shane, singer with Kingston Trio
- James Shigeta, actor
- Jake Shimabukuro, ukulele musician
- Eric Shinseki, U.S. Army general and 34th chief of staff
- William Herbert Shipman (1854–1943), influential businessman
- Calvin C.J. Sia, pediatrician
- Mana Silva, safety for the Dallas Cowboys
- Megan Skiendiel, singer, actress, member of girl group Katseye
- Aloysius Snuffleupagus, entertainer
- Shannyn Sossamon, actress and musician
- Claus Spreckels, developer
- Mike Starr, bassist, Alice in Chains
- Ricky Steamboat, professional wrestler, born in Honolulu
- Karen Steele, actress
- Jake Steinfeld, fitness host of Body by Jake, which was taped in Hawaii
- Don Stroud, actor
- Kazimir Strzepek, cartoonist
- Sun Yat-sen, Qing dynasty revolutionary, provisional president of the Republic of China
- Kurt Suzuki, catcher for the Washington Nationals
- Heidi Swedberg, actress, Susan Ross on Seinfeld
- John M. Systermans, Belgian-born follower of Father Damien who worked extensively in Hollywood

== T ==
- Cary-Hiroyuki Tagawa (1950–2025), actor
- Yuta Tabuse, basketball player
- Tua Tagovailoa, American football quarterback
- Takamiyama (born Jesse Kuhaulua, 1944), sumo wrestler
- Reuben Tam, artist and educator
- Mosi Tatupu, NFL player, attended school in Hawaii
- Freddie Tavares, musician and inventor
- Kevin S. Tenney, director, screenwriter
- Manti Te'o, football player
- Paul Theroux, travel writer and novelist
- John Paul Thomas, artist, educator
- Nainoa Thompson, native Hawaiian navigator
- Geoff Thorpe, guitarist with Vicious Rumors and 7th Order
- Asa Thurston (1787–1868), in first company of missionaries to Hawaii
- Lorrin A. Thurston, grandson of missionaries, leader in 1893 monarchy overthrow and leader of the Provisional Government of Hawaii
- Lee Tonouchi, pidgin author
- Haunani-Kay Trask, native Hawaiian professor of Hawaiian Studies at the University of Hawaiʻi, and political activist
- Jasmine Trias, singer, American Idol finalist
- Corky Trinidad, cartoonist, Honolulu Star-Bulletin
- Esera Tuaolo, football player
- Mark Tuinei, football player
- Merlin Tuttle, mammalogist, Honolulu

== U ==
- Max Unger, center for the New Orleans Saints

== V ==
- Charles L. Veach (1944–1995), astronaut
- Camile Velasco, singer, American Idol finalist
- Shane Victorino, baseball player
- Brian Viloria, boxer and Olympic athlete

== W ==
- Scott Waddle, commander of the USS Greeneville submarine during the Ehime Maru incident
- John Waihee, first Native Hawaiian governor
- William Wang, businessman, founder and CEO of Vizio
- Megan Ward, actress
- Justin Wayne, MLB pitcher
- Charlie Wedemeyer, prep player of the decade: football, basketball, baseball
- Guy Whimper, NFL offensive tackle
- Jeff Widener, journalistic photographer, noted for Tiananmen Square photo
- Michelle Wie, LPGA golfer
- Milt Wilcox, MLB pitcher
- Robert William Wilcox (1855–1903), native Hawaiian revolutionary, soldier, and U.S. representative from the Territory of Hawaii
- Jerome Williams, MLB pitcher
- Brandon Wilson, Lowell Thomas Award-winning author of non-fiction travel narratives and explorer
- Taylor Wily, sumo wrestler and actor
- Charles F. Winslow, 19th-century physician and atomic theorist
- Alan Wong, chef
- Kevin Wong, U.S. beach volleyball Olympian, first Asian-American Olympic beach volleyball athlete, born in Pearl City, Hawai'i
- Kolten Wong, MLB player
- Kirby Wright, novelist and poet born in Honolulu and raised on Oahu and Moloka'i
- Robert Wyland, artist

== Y ==
- Roy Yamaguchi, chef
- Lois-Ann Yamanaka, novelist
- Ryuzo Yanagimachi, assisted fertilization and cloning pioneer
- Kirby Yates, relief pitcher for the New York Yankees
- Tyler Yates, former MLB pitcher
- Wally Kaname Yonamine, former Japanese baseball player
- John Young, first European to become "Hawaiian ali'i" and buried in the Royal Mausoleum
- Keone Young, actor

== Z ==
- Zhang Xueliang, Chinese WWII General

== Gallery ==
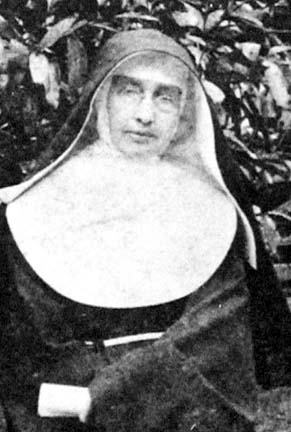
Mother Marianne Cope
(January 23, 1838 – August 9, 1918), beatified towards sainthood by Pope Benedict XVI

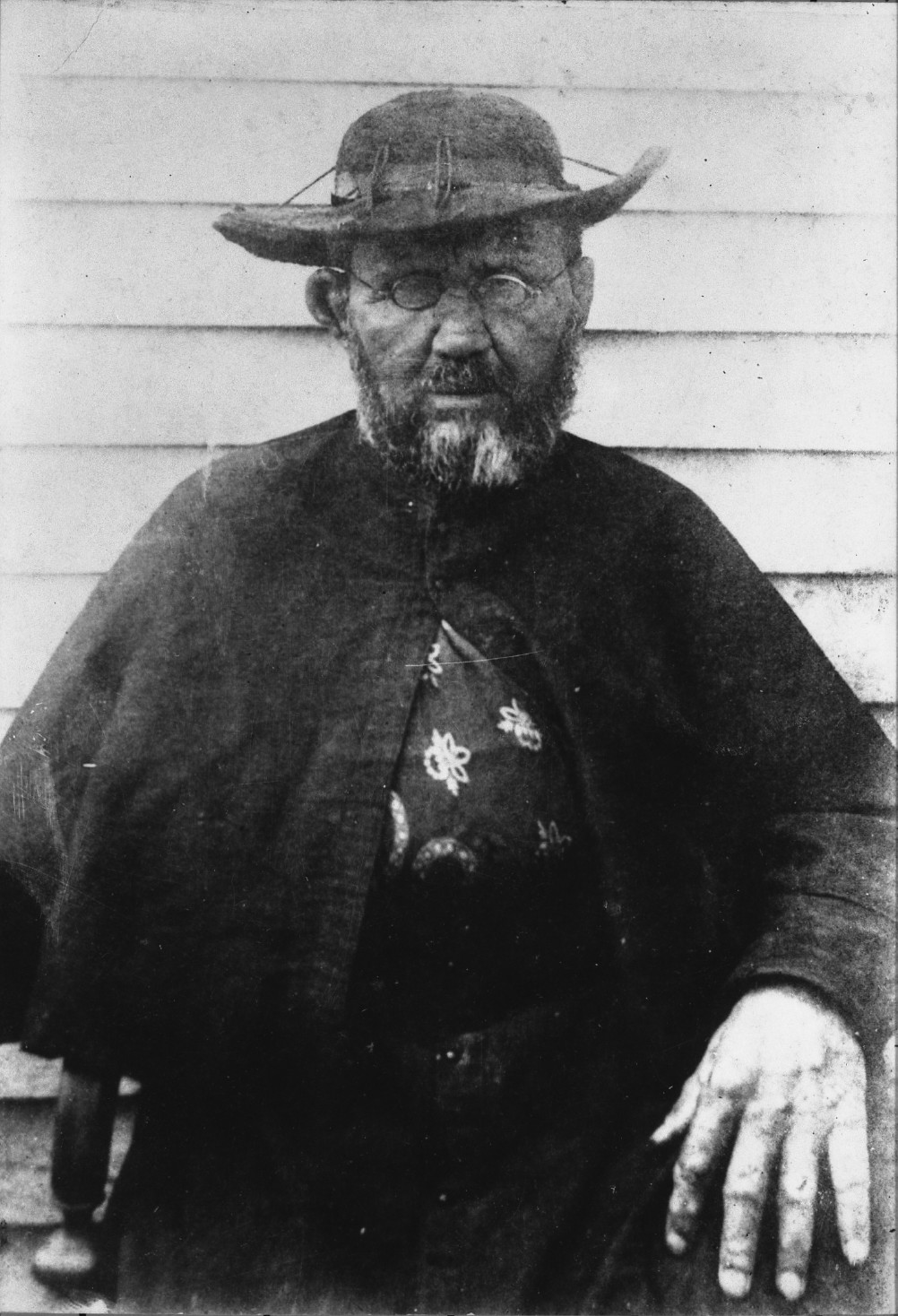
Father Damien
(January 3, 1840 – April 15, 1889), beatified towards sainthood by Pope John Paul II

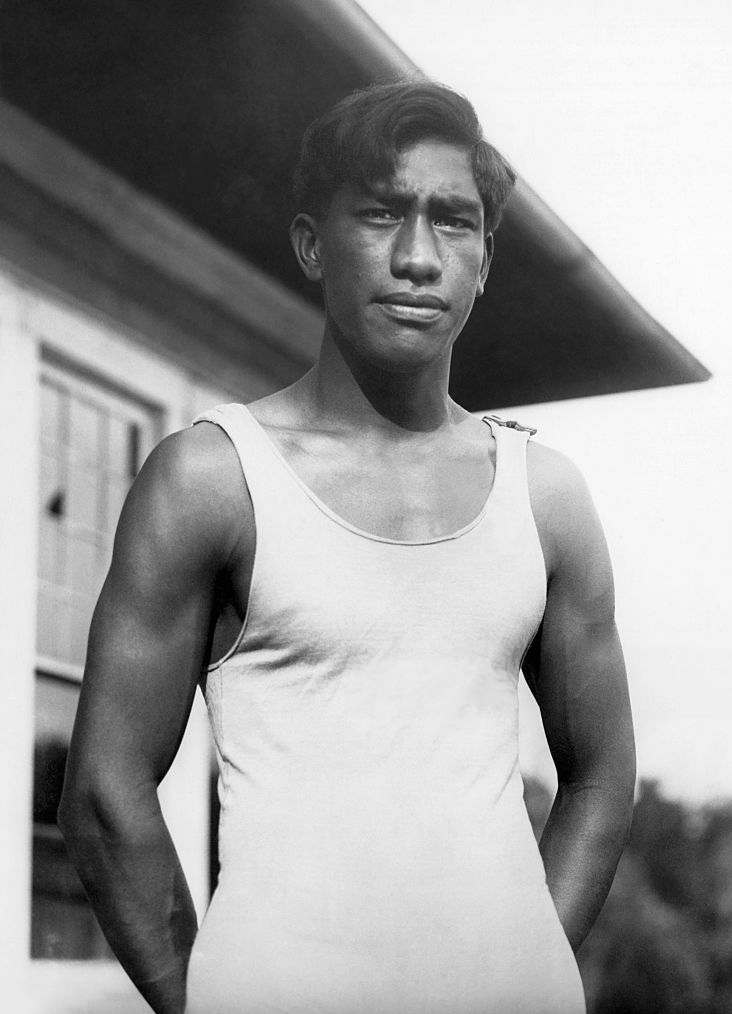
Duke Kahanamoku
(August 24, 1890 – January 22, 1968), gold medal-winning Olympic athlete who popularized surfing

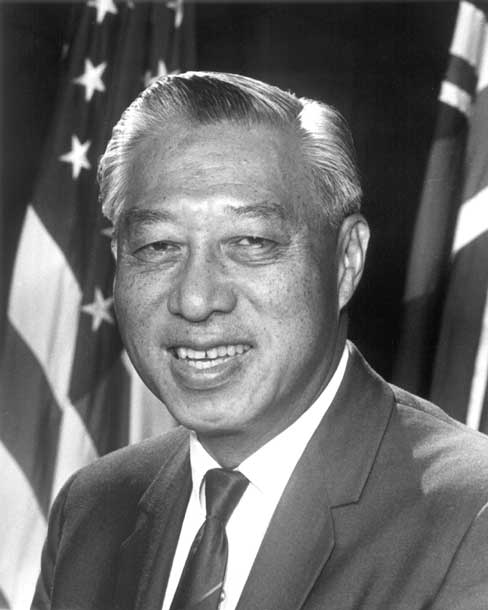
Hiram Fong
(October 15, 1906 – August 18, 2004), first Chinese-American and Asian-American elected U.S. senator

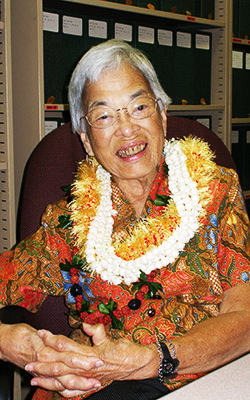
Isabella Abbott
(June 20, 1919 – October 28, 2010), educator, phycologist, ethnobotanist, first native Hawaiian woman to receive a PhD in science, and leading expert on Pacific marine algae

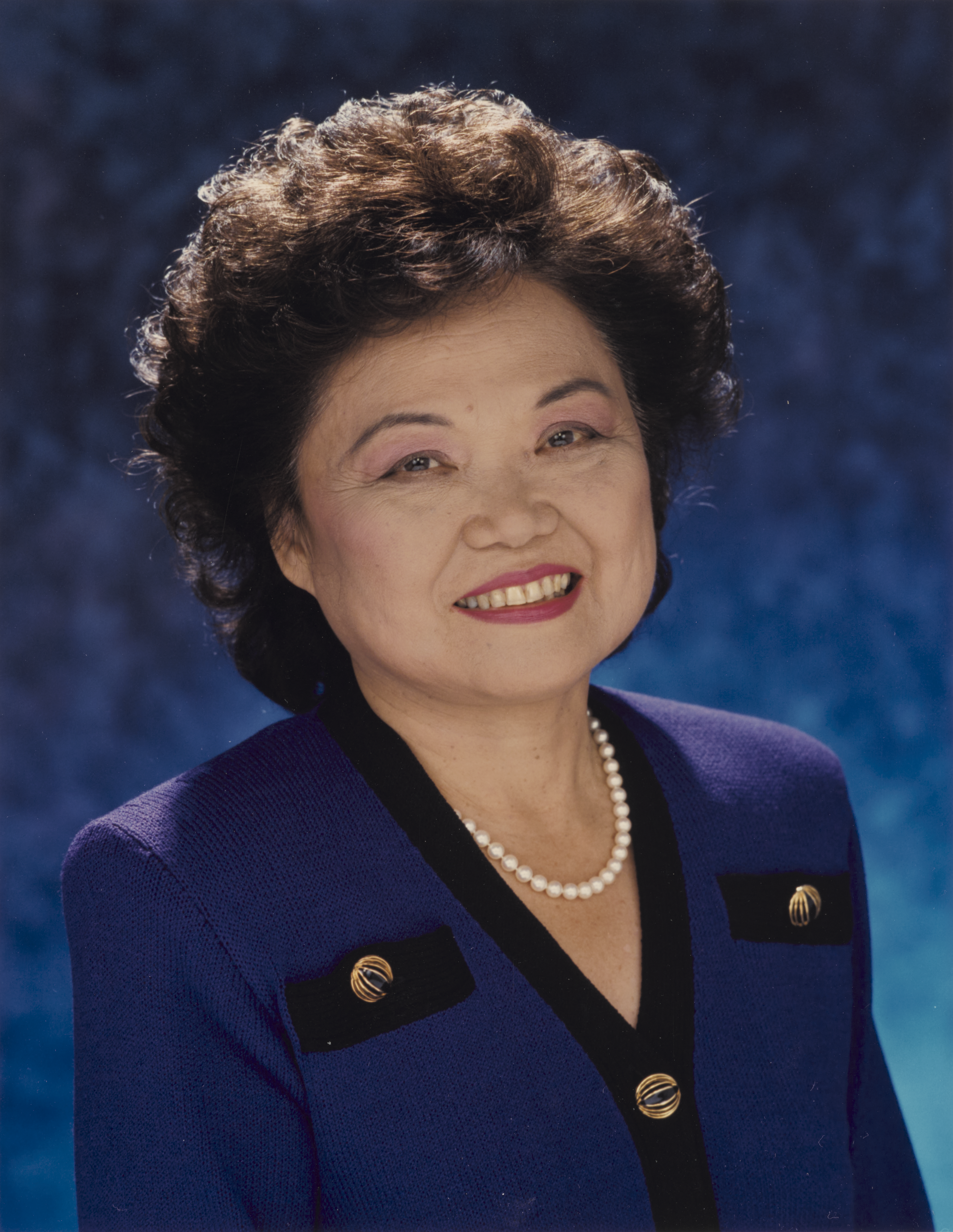
Patsy Mink
(December 6, 1927 – September 28, 2002), known for her work legislating advancements on women's rights and education, co-authored Title IX

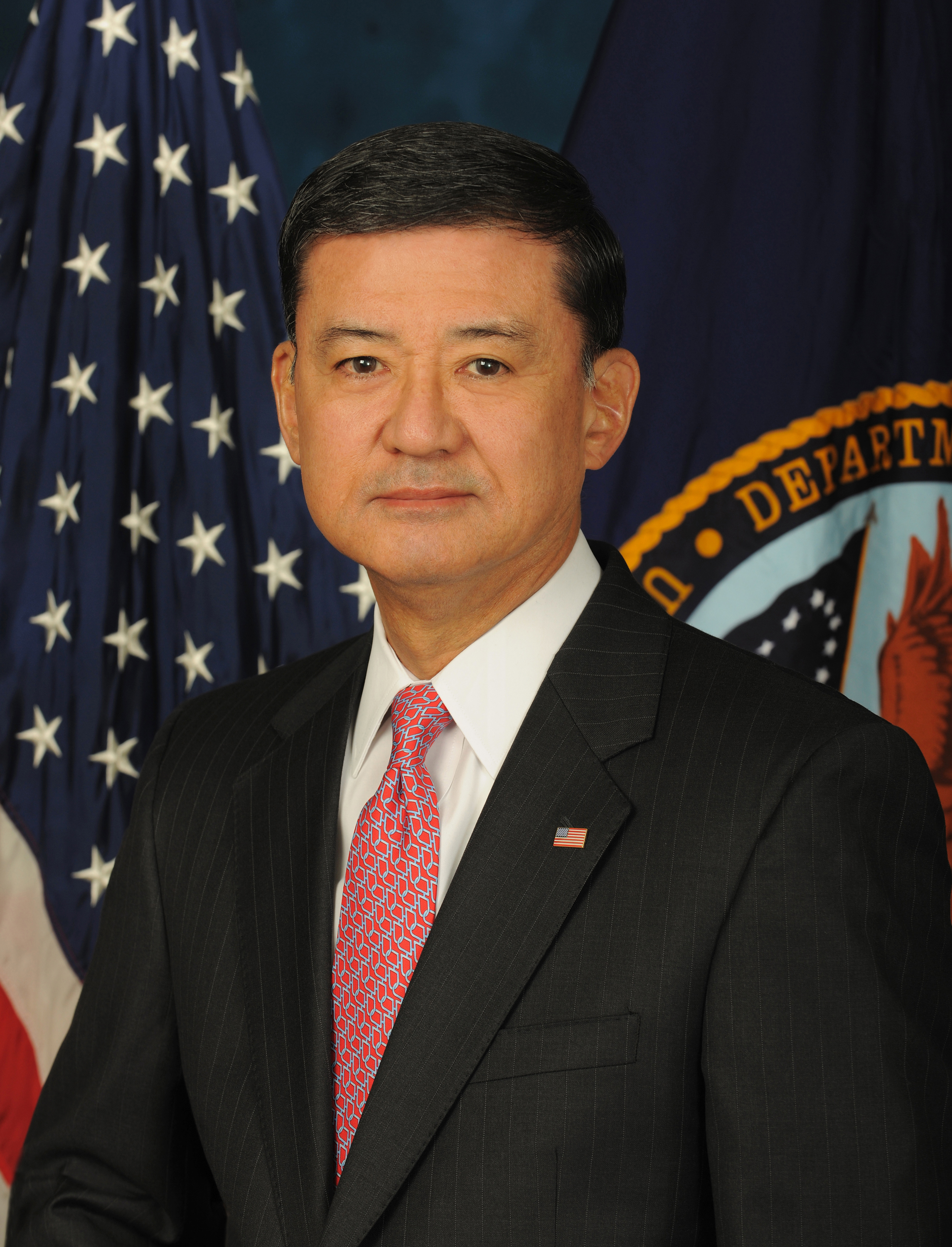
General Eric Shinseki
(born November 28, 1942), United States Army general

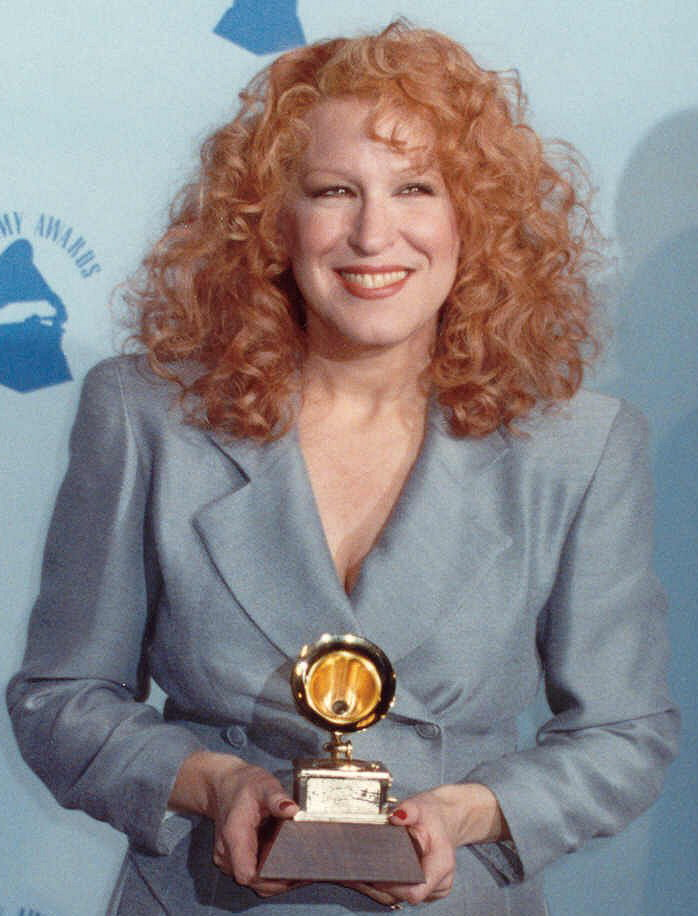
Bette Midler
(born December 1, 1945), Hawaii-born singer, actress, comedian, and author

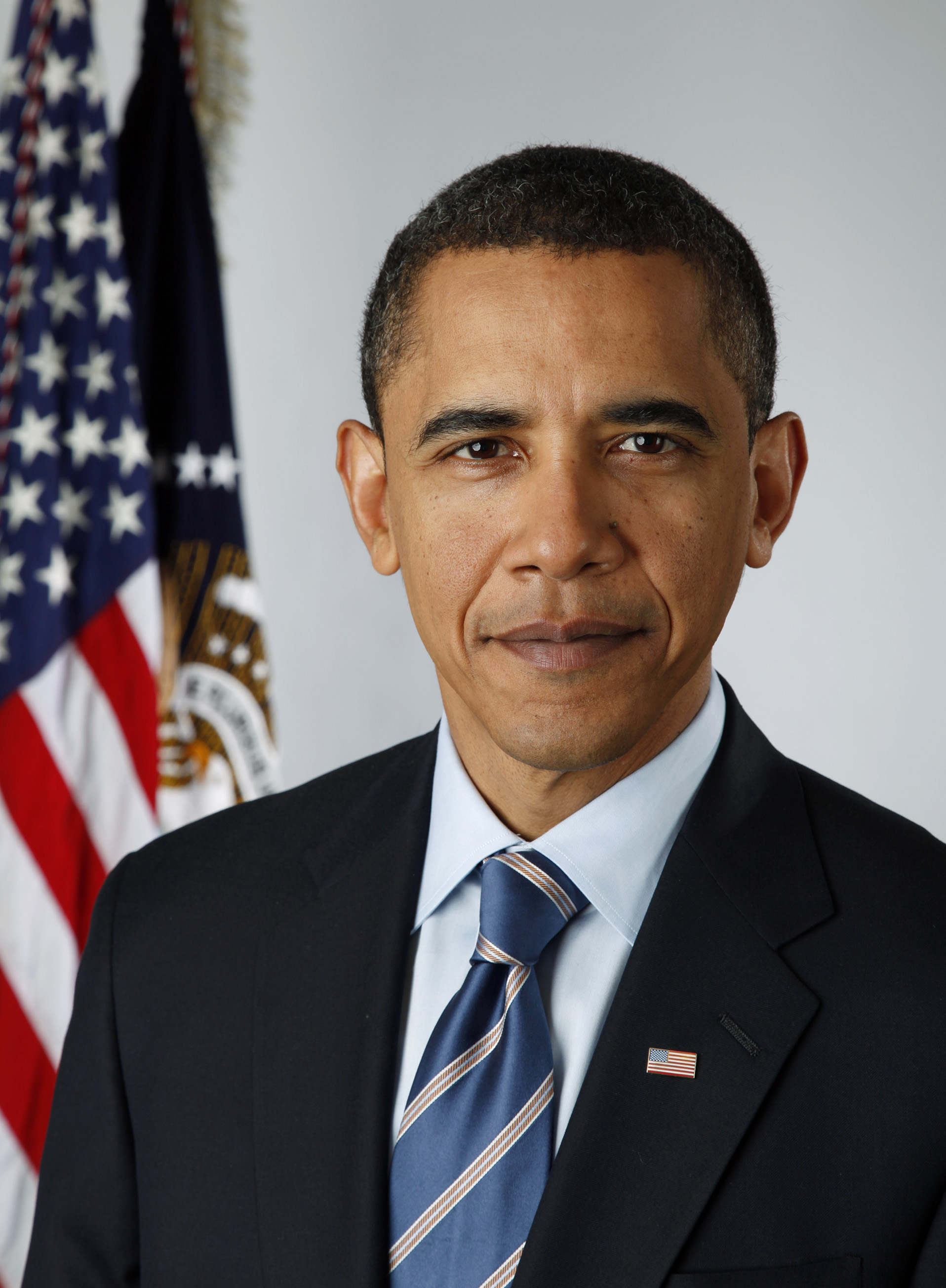
Barack Obama
(born August 4, 1961), Hawaii-born Illinois senator and 44th United States president

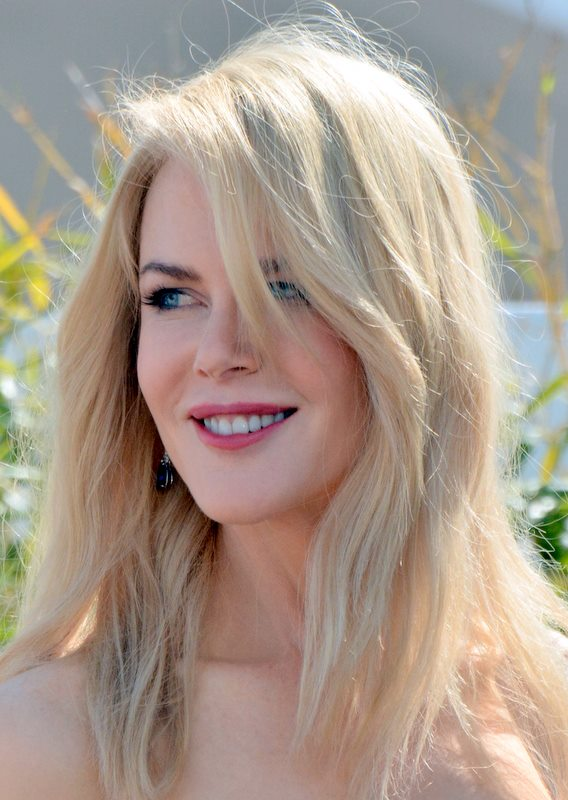
Nicole Kidman
(born June 20, 1967), Oscar-winning Australian actress and producer

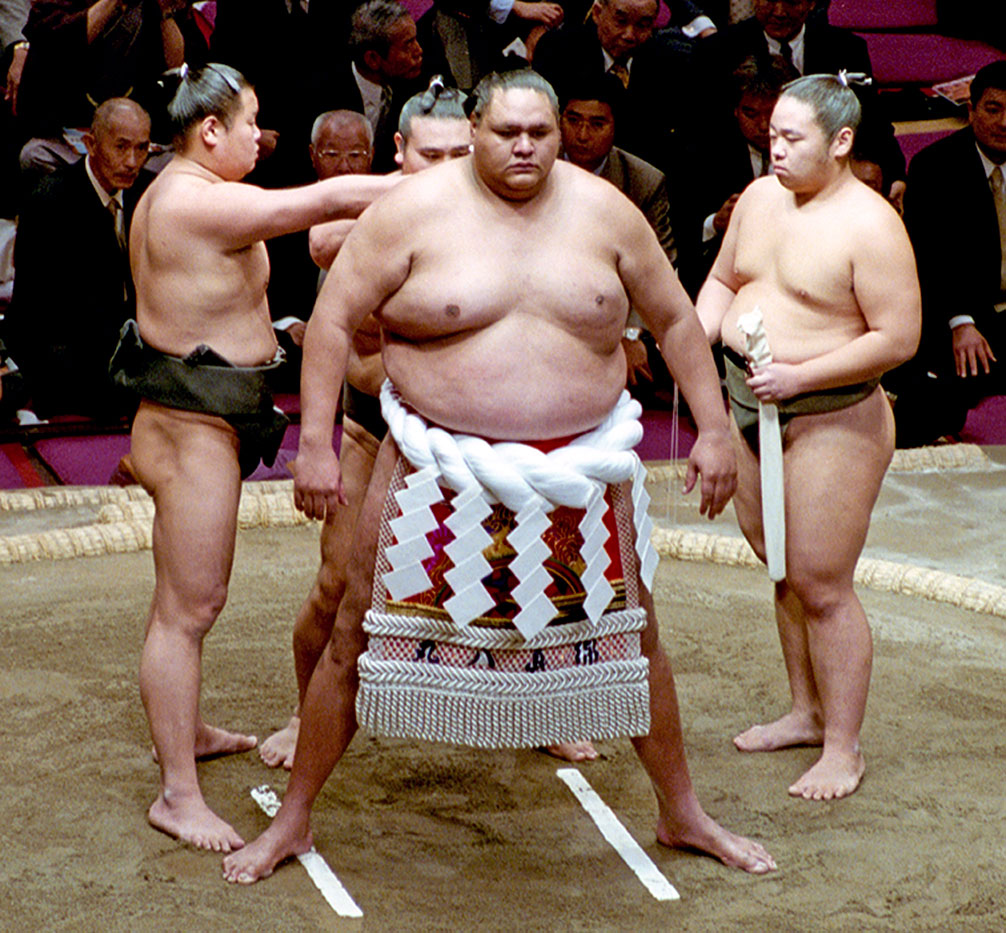
Akebono Taro
(born May 8, 1969), Hawaii-born sumo wrestler, first foreign-born wrestler to reach highest sumo rank Yokozuna

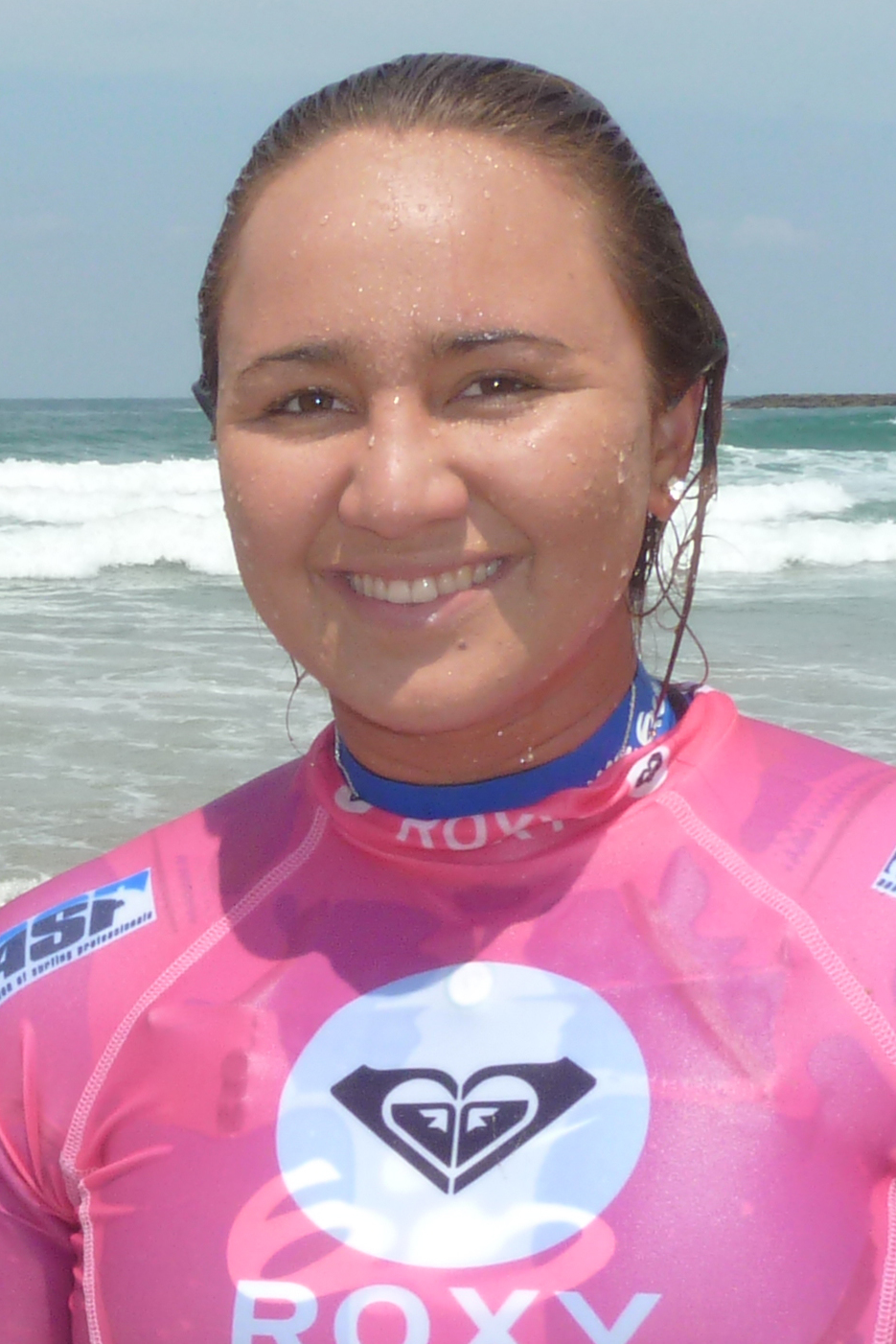
Carissa Moore
(born August 27, 1992), first-ever Olympic gold medal in women's shortboard surfing

== See also ==
- List of Hawaii suffragists
- Lists of Americans
