= Monica Baldwin =

British writer and former Catholic nun

Monica Baldwin (22 February 1893 – 17 November 1975) was a British writer. She spent the first half of her adult life as a Catholic nun, and is notable for the memoir she wrote after leaving her enclosed religious order.

== Biography ==
Baldwin was born in Stourport, Worcestershire, England to Edward Arthur Baldwin and Lucilla Baldwin Livesey. Her great-grandfather was George Pearce Baldwin, grandfather of Prime Minister Stanley Baldwin.

Baldwin joined an enclosed religious order of Augustinian canonesses in 1914, a few months before the beginning of World War I. Ten years later she began to think she had made a mistake but it was another 18 years before she left, convinced that she "was no more fitted to be a nun than to be an acrobat." After 28 years of consecrated life there as a canoness regular, she made the decision to leave, and requested dispensation from her religious vows, which was granted by the Vatican. During her years in the convent, Monica alternated between the English Convent in Bruges, Belgium, and a related Priory at Hazelgrove Park in Hayward's Heath. In 1938, she transferred to St Monica's Priory, then at Rawdon House in Hoddeson, Hertfordshire, and it was from there that she was released from her vows in October 1941. She left on 26 October 1941, during the Second World War.

== Work and writing ==
Among her jobs outside were as a gardener in the Women's Land Army, as a matron in a camp for conscripted young women working in munitions factories, and as an army canteen hostess peeling potatoes. Once a photographer offered her a job developing "dirty pictures" in his cellar. After that she worked as an assistant librarian and then in the War Office.

In 1949, she published a memoir, I Leap Over The Wall: A Return to the World after Twenty-eight Years in a Convent. The book, later sub-titled, Contrasts and impressions after... is a memoir of some of the contrasts between life in an enclosed convent and life out in the contemporary world. Baldwin relates how she could not recall reading a newspaper during the entire course of the First World War. When she entered, the popular use of telephones, cinema and radio were in their infancy; when she left they were common in England.

Her novel, The Called and the Chosen, written as the diary of Sister Ursula Auberon, an enclosed nun at the Abbaye de la Sainte Croix, Framleghen, was published in 1957 by Farrar, Straus & Cudahy. The book followed the 1956 publication of The Nun's Story, a novel by Kathryn Hulme, partly based on the experiences of her companion Marie Louise Habets, who left the Sisters of Charity of Jesus and Mary,. In 1965, Baldwin published her second autobiographical book, called Goose in the Jungle. A Flight Round the World with Digressions.

== Personal life ==
In the 1960s Baldwin lived on Alderney in the Channel Islands. Later, she lived at a religious retirement home near Bury St. Edmunds. She died in 1975 and is buried in Clare, Suffolk.
