= Garrett Hongo =

American poet (born 1951)

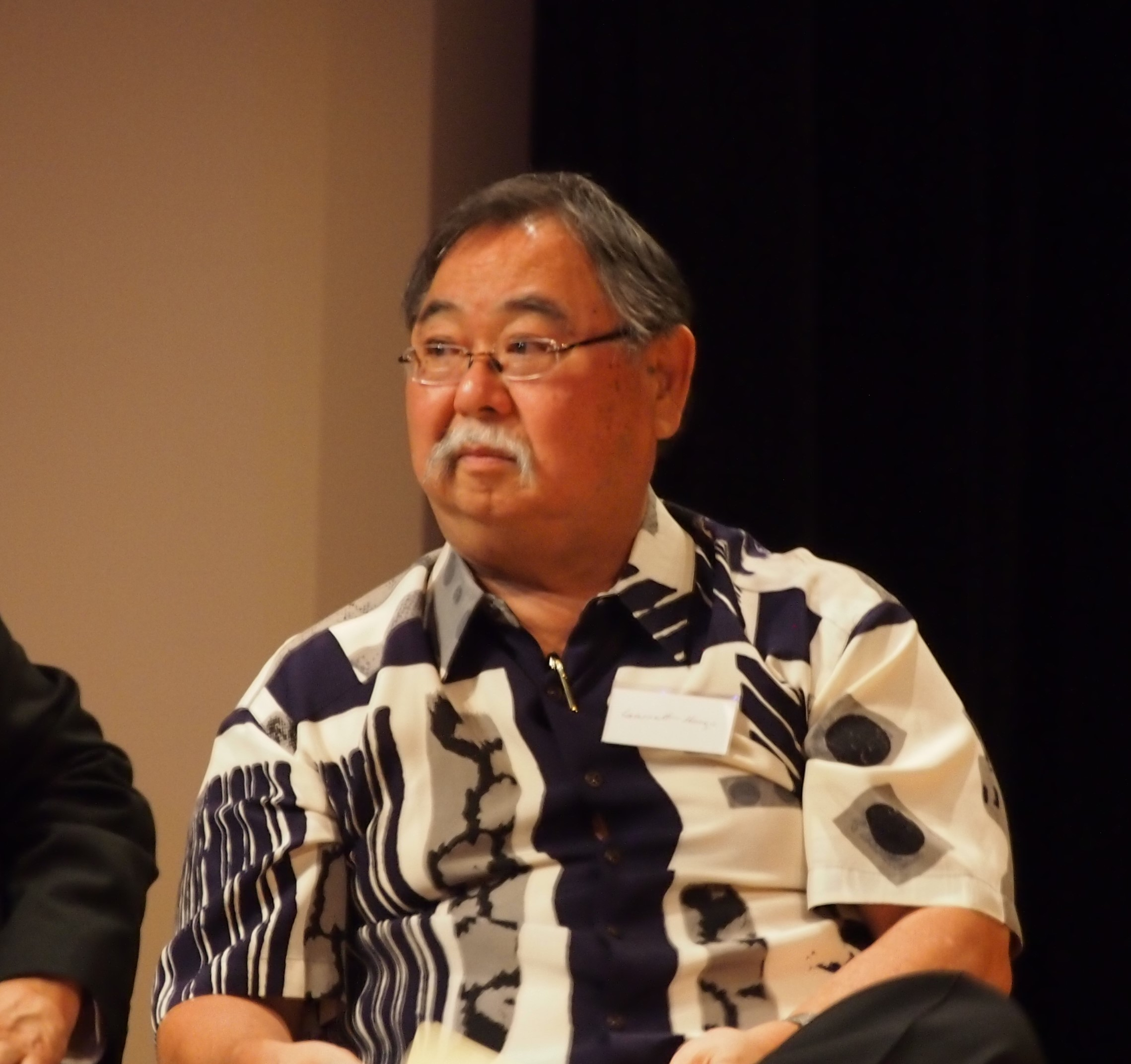
- Born: May 30, 1951 (age 75); Volcano, Hawai'i, U.S.
- Education: Pomona College; University of Michigan (BA); University of California, Irvine (MFA)
- Occupation: poet
- Children: 2
- Writing career
- Notable works: The River of Heaven; Volcano: A Memoir of Hawaiʻi
- Notable awards: Pulitzer finalist; Oregon Book Award; Guggenheim Fellow, NEA Fellowship, Rockefeller Fellowship

Garrett Kaoru Hongo (born May 30, 1951) is a Yonsei, fourth-generation Japanese American academic and poet. His work draws on Japanese American history and his own experiences.

He was a finalist for the Pulitzer Prize for Poetry for The River of Heaven (1988).

== Early life ==
Hongo was born in Volcano, Hawai'i. He attended Pomona College and the University of Michigan, and received a Master of Fine Arts degree in English from the University of California, Irvine.

Hongo has been awarded fellowships from the Watson Foundation, the Guggenheim Foundation, the National Endowment for the Arts, and the Rockefeller Foundation.

== Career ==
Hongo is a professor of creative writing at the University of Oregon. From 1989 through 1993, he was the director of the university's Program in Creative Writing.

Hongo has published three books of poetry. His first was Yellow Light (1982), and The River of Heaven (1988) was a Lamont Poetry Selection of the Academy of American Poets and a finalist for the Pulitzer Prize for Poetry. Volcano: A Memoir of Hawai'i (1995) was awarded the 2006 Oregon Book Award for Literary Nonfiction. Hongo has also worked as an editor on Songs My Mother Taught Me: Stories, Plays and Memoir by Wakako Yamauchi (1994) and on The Open Boat: Poems from Asian America (1993).

Hongo served as Guest Editor of Poem-a-Day in May 2025.

== Selected works ==
In a statistical overview derived from writings by and about Garett Hongo, OCLC/WorldCat includes roughly 30+ works in 70+ publications in two languages and 4,600+ library holdings.

- The Buddha Bandits down Highway 99 (1978)
- Yellow Light (University of California, Irvine, 1980; Wesleyan University Press, 1982, ISBN 9780819511041)
- The River of Heaven (Knopf, 1988, ISBN 978-0-394-56843-0; Carnegie Mellon University Press, 2001, ISBN 978-0-88748-358-5)
- The Open boat: Poems from Asian America (1993)
- Volcano: A Memoir of Hawaiʻi (1995)
- Coral Road: Poems (2011)
- The Mirror Diary: Selected Essays (University of Michigan Press, 2017, ISBN 978-0-472-03702-5)
- The Perfect Sound: A Memoir in Stereo (2022)

Anthologies

- "from Cruising 99", The geography of home: California's poetry of place, Editors Christopher Buckley, Gary Young, Heyday Books, 1999, ISBN 978-1-890771-19-5
- "Yellow Light", Bold words: a century of Asian American writing, Editors Rajini Srikanth, Esther Yae Iwanaga, Rutgers University Press, 2001, ISBN 978-0-8135-2966-0
- "Kapu Tube", Hawaiʻi: true stories of the island spirit, Editors Rick Carroll, Marcie Carroll, Travelers' Tales, 1999, ISBN 978-1-885211-35-4
- "Something Whispered in the Shakuhachi", What book!?: Buddha poems from beat to hiphop, Editor Gary Gach, Parallax Press, 1997, ISBN 978-0-938077-92-3
- Unsettling America: an anthology of contemporary multicultural poetry, Editors Maria M. Gillan, Jennifer Gillan, Penguin Books, 1994, ISBN 978-0-14-023778-8

== See also ==
- List of Asian American writers
- List of people from Hawaii
