= Sisters of Charity of Jesus and Mary =

Roman Catholic religious institute founded in Ghent, Belgium

Congregation of the Sisters of Charity of Jesus and Mary
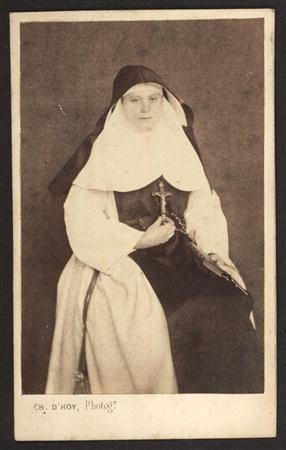
- A Sister of Charity of Jesus and Mary in the traditional habit, c. 1900
- Type: Religious institute
- Classification: Catholicism
- Orientation: Helping the needy and the sick
- Theology: Saint Vincent de Paul; Saint Bernard of Clairvaux
- Polity: The Holy See
- Superior General: Sr. Lucy Jacob Palliampallithara
- Provinces: Dehli (India); Dutch-speaking (Belgium/Netherlands); Pakistan; Sri Lanka; Ranchi (India); Belgian South; St. Bernard (Democratic Republic of Congo); St. Vincent de Paul (Democratic Republic of Congo)
- Vice-province: Our Lady of Kibeho (Rwanda)
- Regions: Anglo-Irish; Mali; Our Lady Of Lavang (Vietnam)
- Language: English; French; Dutch
- Liturgy: Roman Rite
- Headquarters: Brussels, Belgium
- Founder: Canon Peter Joseph Triest; Mother Placide Van der Gauwen
- Origin: 4 November 1803; 222 years ago Lovendegem, Ghent, Belgium
- Other names: Sisters of Charity of Jesus and Mary; Institute of The Sisters of Charity of Jesus and Mary
- Official website: www.sistersofcharityofjesusandmary.org
- Slogan: Latin: Deus Caritas est. (God is love)

The Congregation of the Sisters of Charity of Jesus and Mary is a Roman Catholic religious institute founded in Ghent, Belgium. An enclosed religious order, its main apostolate is helping the needy and the sick, inspired by the work of Saint Vincent de Paul and Saint Bernard of Clairvaux.

Their traditional habit, in the Cistercian tradition, was a white tunic with a black veil and scapular.

The Superior General of the order is Sr. Lucy Jacob Palliampallithara, who is based in the global headquarters in Brussels, Belgium.

== History ==
On 4 November 1803, the Congregation was founded by the Rev. Canon Peter Joseph Triest, the pastor of Lovendegem at that time. Triest, who was to found two other religious institutes for the relief of the poor, recruited a group of young women, from among whom the co-foundress Mother Placida van der Gauwen came. Mother Placida later became the first Mother Superior of the congregation.

In the late 19th century, they established missions in the Belgian Congo (1892), British Ceylon (1896) and British India (1897). They were also invited to open a house in England by Cardinal Herbert Vaughan.

In 2018, two convents in the Congo were attacked and robbed by armed men.

== In popular culture ==
From this congregation came Marie Louise Habets (Sister Xaverine), who served as the basis for Sister Luke / Gabrielle Van der Mal, the protagonist of the 1956 Kathryn Hulme novel The Nun's Story. Her character was later portrayed by Audrey Hepburn in the 1959 film adaptation of the book.

== See also ==
- Religious congregation
- Institute of consecrated life
- Religious institute
