= National Board of Review Awards 1959 =

Annual US film awards ceremony

31st National Board of Review Awards

Late December, 1959

The 31st National Board of Review Awards were announced in late December, 1959.

== Top Ten Films ==
1. The Nun's Story
2. Ben-Hur
3. Anatomy of a Murder
4. The Diary of Anne Frank
5. Middle of the Night
6. The Man Who Understood Women
7. Some Like It Hot
8. Suddenly, Last Summer
9. On the Beach
10. North by Northwest

== Top Foreign Films ==
1. Wild Strawberries
2. Room at the Top
3. Aparajito
4. The Roof
5. Look Back in Anger

== Winners ==
- Best Film: The Nun's Story
- Best Foreign Film: Wild Strawberries
- Best Actor: Victor Sjöström (Wild Strawberries)
- Best Actress: Simone Signoret (Room at the Top)
- Best Supporting Actor: Hugh Griffith (Ben-Hur)
- Best Supporting Actress: Edith Evans (The Nun's Story)
- Best Director: Fred Zinnemann (The Nun's Story)
- Special Citation: Ingmar Bergman; Andrew Marton, Yakima Canutt (Ben-Hur, for directing the chariot race)
