= Marie Louise Habets =

Belgian nurse, former religious sister and humanitarian worker

- Born: January 1905; Egem, West Flanders, Belgium
- Died: May 1986 (81 years old); Hawaii, United States
- Other names: Sister Xaverine, S.C.J.M.
- Occupations: Nurse and religious sister
- Known for: Being the model for the protagonist of the 1956 novel The Nun's Story

Marie Louise Habets (January 1905 – May 1986) was a Belgian nurse and former religious sister whose life was fictionalised as Sister Luke (Gabrielle van der Mal) in The Nun's Story, a bestselling 1956 book by American author Kathryn Hulme. The Belgian-born actress Audrey Hepburn portrayed Gabrielle van der Mal in the 1959 Fred Zinnemann film The Nun's Story, and was nominated for the Academy Award for Best Actress.

== Life ==
Habets was born in West Flanders in January 1905. In 1926, she entered the Sisters of Charity of Jesus and Mary, an enclosed religious order which cared for the sick and poor within their cloister. She was admitted to their convent on Molenaarstraat in Ghent, and then took the religious name Sister Xaverine.

In 1933, she was sent to the mission hospital in Belgian Congo which her congregation staffed for the colonial government. She contracted tuberculosis and returned to her home country in the summer of 1939, shortly before the start of World War II and the subsequent German invasion of Belgium. Her father was killed shortly after this, causing Sister Xaverine to develop such a hatred toward the Germans that she became involved with the Belgian Resistance. She came to feel that she could not obey the dictates of her faith for forgiveness and applied to the Holy See for a dispensation from her religious vows – a very rare request in her day. She was eventually granted this, and left the congregation on 16 August 1944 from their convent in Uccle.

Habets settled in Antwerp, which was liberated by Allied forces a few weeks later. She joined a British First Aid unit which nursed the soldiers wounded while fighting in the Battle of the Bulge. She was present in Antwerp when German forces massively bombarded the city soon after its liberation, killing and maiming some 10,000 people. After the end of the war in Europe, she was sent to Germany to help care for her fellow Belgians who had been imprisoned in concentration camps there.

Kathryn Hulme's 1966 autobiography Undiscovered Country describes her first meeting with Habets in 1945. Both were volunteers with the United Nations Relief and Rehabilitation Administration (UNRRA), an international project working to resettle refugees and others displaced by the war. Hulme recounts that, at a training camp in northern France, she became aware of a Belgian woman who spent most of her time asleep. Even when awake, the woman, a nurse, was taciturn, solitary and preoccupied, almost asocial. In time, however, the Belgian nurse revealed herself as a diligent worker, a good friend, and a woman with a secret: she had just left the convent after 17 years of struggle with her vows. She felt burdened and depressed by a deep sense of failure.

British writer Zoe Fairbairns took up the story with an article, The Nun’s True Story, and a radio play, The Belgian Nurse, aired by the BBC in 2007. Both show how Habets's life became Hulme's bestseller, and how the two women became friends, sharing a home for nearly 40 years. Their parallel lives are explored in "The Nun and the Crocodile: The Stories within The Nun's Story", a paper given by Debra Campbell at the Women and Religion section of the American Academy of Religion Annual Meeting on November 21, 2004.

== Hulme papers ==
Documents relating to Habets can be found among the Kathryn Hulme papers which are held at the Beinecke Library at Yale University in the United States.

These include a report by Habets about a repatriation transport from the displaced persons resettlement camp at Wildflecken, Bavaria, which set off for Poland on April 30, 1946. The report is written in English, which Habets did not speak fluently at the time; it was probably translated by Hulme. Read in conjunction with Chapter 14 of Undiscovered Country, it shows the high value placed by Hulme, an American who had not lived under enemy occupation, on the first-hand knowledge, experience and powers of observation of her Belgian colleague. There is also a report by Habets on caring for tuberculosis patients at Wildflecken.

== Later life ==
In late 1948, Habets had been promoted to Area Chief Nurse by the International Refugee Organization of the United Nations. After continuing to help displaced persons for the next several years, she decided that she had no desire to live in her homeland again, and requested an American visa. Hulme was her sponsor in this, and the visa was granted. After one last visit with her family, Habets and Hulme sailed from Antwerp to the United States on the SS Noordam, arriving in New York City during February 1951. They initially settled in Arizona, where she worked as a nurse in a hospital serving the Navajo people. They later moved to California, where she nursed Audrey Hepburn after a horse-riding accident which occurred during her filming of The Unforgiven.

In 1960, Hulme and Habets moved to the Hawaiian island of Kauai, where Hulme continued to write, with Habets's support and assistance. They grew tropical fruits, bred dogs, rode horses, had friends to stay, gave talks, and socialized among the other Kauai expats. They remained Catholics, and Hulme continued her involvement with the work of the mystic G. I. Gurdjieff. Habets did some nursing, though mainly on a private basis for friends. Hulme and Habets travelled widely, sometimes together, sometimes independently.

== Death and legacy ==
Habets died in May 1986, five years after Hulme. Having inherited her literary estate, Habets, in her own will, shared it out among members of her own family, members of Hulme's family, and six sisters. There may at one time been some confusion about who owned the rights, and who could give permissions, which may explain why at least some of Hulme's books were out-of-print for several years. However, as of March 2025, it appears that several of Hulme's books have been reissued in paperback editions and are also available for purchase digitally.

== Bibliography ==
K. Hulme, Undiscovered Country, Atlantic Little Brown, 1966

== See also ==
- Monica Baldwin, who left her enclosed order after 28 years, and wrote a memoir about it
