= H. Alexander Walker Residence =

Historic house in Hawaii, United States

- U.S. National Register of Historic Places
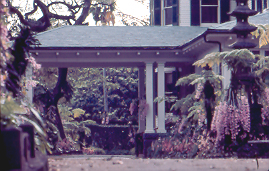
- H. Alexander Walker Residence in 1971

- Location within Hawaii
- Location: 2616 Pali Highway, Honolulu, Hawaii
- Coordinates: 21°19′55″N 157°50′37″W
- Area: 6 acres (2.4 ha)
- Built: 1905
- Architectural style: Classical Revival
- NRHP reference No.: 73000665
- Added to NRHP: April 24, 1973

The H. Alexander Walker Residence or Walker Estate is a historic home located in the upper Nuʻuanu Valley of Honolulu, Hawaii.

== History ==
The house was built in 1903 by George Rodiek of Hackfeld and Company, a naturalised German immigrant. Originally the estate comprised a two-story home with a series of gardens featuring ferns, rocks and orchards, sometimes called the oldest formal Japanese garden in Honolulu.

Rodiek served as German consul as well as president of the Hawaiian Sugar Planters' Association. In 1917, he was accused of involvement in the Hindu German Conspiracy to foment revolution in India. Though subsequently given a presidential pardon, he sold the house to Alan Wilcox in 1918 and moved with his family to San Francisco, never to return. In the 1930s the house was purchased by Mr. & Mrs. H. Alexander Walker. Mr. Walker was president of American Factors, the successor firm to Hackfeld and Company, and Hawaiian Sugar Planters Association. Mr. Walker, whose father J.S. Walker was a member of King Kalakaua's cabinet, dubbed the gracious estate "Mamalu", meaning "Shady Lawns." The Walkers turned the estate into world-famous orchid gardens.

During World War II, Fleet Admiral Chester W. Nimitz enjoyed many dinners with his friends the Walkers and playing horseshoes at the residence. The irony was that the Walkers' cook, a Japanese National named Hara, could have poisoned the entire Pacific Fleet high command during hundreds of meals. Nimitz always congratulated him for his fine meals. What a paradox it was, but Hara was totally loyal to the Walkers and an honorable man.

On April 24, 1973, at the request of Una Walker, H. Alexander Walker's widow, the house was added as site 73000665 to the National Register of Historic Places listings in Oahu and listed as a "valuable historic property" by Hawaii Historic Places. Una Walker maintained the estate by making the grounds available for weddings and visitors and as a movie and television set. It appeared in many Hawaii 5-0 and Magnum PI shows. Una's grandson, former Hawaii Attorney General Michael A. Lilly and his wife Cindy Walter were the last members of the Walker family to live on the estate. In 1989, two years after Una's death, the house and its 5.86-acre (23,700 m^{2}) grounds were sold by the Walker heirs to Masao Nangaku of Minami Group (USA) Inc. for $8.5 million. His intention was to restore the original house to be used as a corporate retreat. He renovated the house and received a Preservation Honor Award from the Historic Hawaii Foundation, as well as a Grand Award in the Building Industry of America's Renaissance competition.

After Nangaku experienced financial problems, Richard Fried and partners took the property over and, in 1998, asked for planning permission to build a chapel to facilitate weddings on the site. When this was refused, the estate was sold to Holy-eye.

Master Sun-Don Lee is the founder of Holly Eye, LLC. In 1999, he has renamed the property to Forshang Garden and dedicated this place to his beloved teacher Master YuanDao Bodhisattva. The house and grounds are still being maintained in their original condition.
