= Louise Davidson =

American actress and theatrical manager

Louise Davidson was an American actress and theatrical manager affiliated with a group of women, mostly writers and mostly lesbians, who called themselves "The Rope" and were active in Paris's Left Bank in the 1930s and '40s. The women were a selected group of students of the spiritual teacher George Gurdjieff, who often employed shock techniques that today would be seen to resemble those associated with Zen or Sufi masters. Several of the Rope members were also close acquaintances of Gertrude Stein. Davidson related to the Gurdjieff work more through experience and feelings than words and writing. She returned to the United States at the outbreak of World War II and spent her remaining years working with the theater company led by actress Eva Le Gallienne in Connecticut.
