= Kathryn Hulme =

American novelist

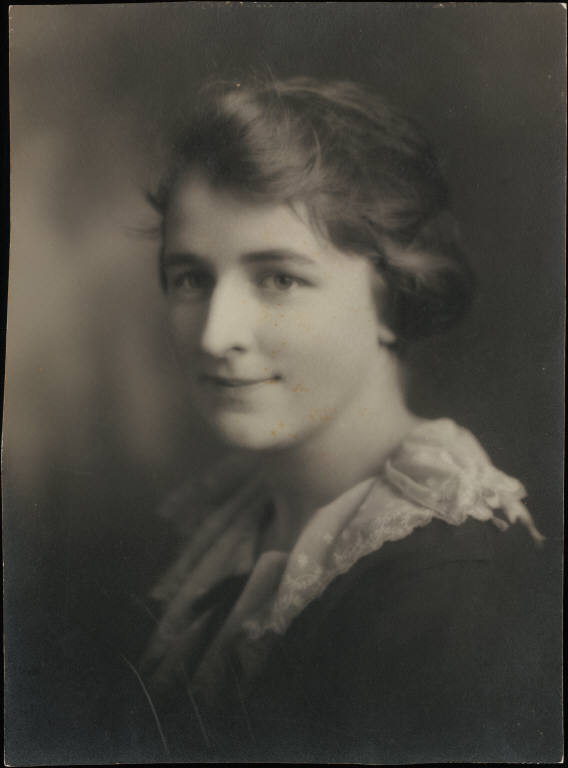
- Born: Kathryn Cavarly Hulme; July 6, 1900 San Francisco, California
- Died: August 25, 1981 (aged 81) Lihue, Kauai, Hawaii
- Spouse: Leonard D. Geldert (1925–1928)

Kathryn Cavarly Hulme (January 6, 1900 – August 25, 1981) was an American novelist and memoirist.

== Writing ==
Hulme is known for her best-selling 1956 novel The Nun's Story, which was adapted into an award-winning 1959 film directed by Fred Zinneman and starring Audrey Hepburn and Peter Finch. The novel is commonly misunderstood to be semi-autobiographical.

Hulme is also the author of the 1953 memoir The Wild Place, a vivid description of her experiences as the UNRRA Director of the Polish Displaced Persons camp at Wildflecken, Germany, after World War II. This work won the Atlantic Non-Fiction Award in 1952.

It was at Wildflecken that Hulme met a Belgian nurse and former nun Marie Louise Habets, who became her lifelong companion. The Nun's Story is a slightly fictionalized biographical account of Habets' life as a nun.

Another work, the 1967 memoir The Undiscovered Country: A Spiritual Adventure, was a description of her years as a student of mystic G. I. Gurdjieff and her eventual conversion to Catholicism. Hulme studied with Gurdjieff as part of a group of eight women known as "The Rope," which included: Solita Solano, Kathryn Hulme, Alice Rohrer, Elizabeth Gordon, Louise Davidson, Georgette Leblanc, Margaret Caroline Anderson and Jane Heap. In her 1938 fictionalized autobiography We Lived as Children, Hulme describes a child's perspective of San Francisco after the 1906 earthquake.

== Bibliography ==
- Arab Interlude, Macrae Smith Company (Philadelphia), 1930
- Desert Night, The Macauley Company (New York), 1932
- We lived as children, A.A. Knopf (New York, London), 1938 (LCCN: 38027542, ASIN: B000GBZZIU)
- The Wild Place, (Atlantic Prize for Nonfiction (1952), Brown Little, 1953, (ISBN 9787100102407)
- The Nun's Story, Pocket Books, 1958 (ASIN: B000CBFXYA)
- The Undiscovered Country: A Spiritual Adventure, Little, Brown & Co. (Boston USA/Toronto CA), 1967; reprinted (Natural Bridge Editions: Lexington MA, 1997) (ISBN 1-891218-03-4)
- Look a Lion in the Eye: On Safari Through Africa, Little, Brown & Co. First edition (1974) (ISBN 0316381403)
- Annie's Captain, Little, Brown and Company (Boston, Toronto), 1961

== See also ==
- Margaret Caroline Anderson
- Monica Baldwin
- G. I. Gurdjieff
- Marie Louise Habets
- Jane Heap
- Solita Solano
