= The Nun's Story =

1956 novel by Kathryn Hulme

- First edition (publ. Little, Brown)
- Author: Kathryn Hulme
- Language: English
- Publication date: 1956

The Nun's Story is a 1956 novel by Kathryn Hulme. It was a Book of the Month selection and reached No. 1 on The New York Times Best Seller list.

== Premise ==
The lead character of the book, Sister Luke (legal name Gabrielle van der Mal), finds her faith tested in Africa where she finds herself at odds with headstrong Dr. Fortunati, operator of a remote hospital in the Belgian Congo, with whom she gradually builds respect, and again during World War II, when she is ordered not to take sides. Ultimately, Sister Luke is forced to decide whether to remain in the convent or return to the outside world.

Sister Luke is stretched between her desire to be faithful to the rule of her congregation and her desire to be a nurse in the mission. As a nun, she must remove all vestiges of her former life and sublimate herself into the devoted bride of Christ. As a nun, there is no room for her personal desires and aspirations. Ultimately, the conflict between her devotion to the Church and her own will, juxtaposed with her passionate Belgian patriotism (her father was killed by Nazi fighter planes while praying for victims of an air raid) bring her to an impasse, which serves as the dénouement of the novel.

== Development ==
The book was inspired by the experiences of her friend, Marie Louise Habets of the Sisters of Charity of Jesus and Mary, a Belgian nurse and an ex-nun whom she met while working with refugees in post-war Europe. The author sponsored the former nun's emigration to the United States, and later converted to Catholicism.

== Film adaptation ==
In 1959, the book was adapted into a film by screenwriter Robert Anderson and director Fred Zinnemann. The Nun's Story starred Audrey Hepburn as Sister Luke. It was a critical and box-office success, and was nominated for eight oscars at the 32nd Academy Awards, including Best Picture and Hepburn's third nomination for Best Actress.

Hepburn met Marie-Louise Habets while preparing for the role, and Habets later helped nurse Hepburn back to health following her near-fatal horse-riding accident on the set of the 1960 film The Unforgiven. The relationship between Hulme, Habets and Hepburn is explored in Zoe Fairbairns' radio play The Belgian Nurse, first broadcast on BBC Radio Four in January 2007.
