= George Rodiek =

George Rodiek was one of the defendants in the Hindu–German Conspiracy Trial in San Francisco, in 1918.

A former Bremen tobacco clerk, Rodiek migrated to Hawaii and took up a position with Hackfeld & Co in 1891. He became a naturalised United States citizen. In 1896, he opened the Hilo branch of the company, and became a director in 1900.

He had six children.

In 1903 he built the Walker Estate, in the upper Nuuanu Valley. Originally this was a two-story home with a series of gardens featuring ferns, rocks, and orchards, generally regarded as the oldest formal Japanese garden in Honolulu.

Rodiek was active in the community, and by 1916 he was president of the Hawaiian Sugar Planters' Association. He was also a Shriner and helped organise the Army-Navy YMCA. In 1917 he was made German consul. Several German ships were seized by the Hawaiian authorities when their crews prepared to wreck engineering and navigation equipment, fearing a declaration of war. His attempts to have them released were backed up by the secretary of state, but the territorial governor had not released them by the time war was declared.

His secretary was involved in meeting the SS Maverick during the Annie Larsen plot to send arms to revolutionaries opposing the British Empire in India as part of the Hindu-German Conspiracy.

Rodiek was later arrested when travelling through San Francisco. He originally pleaded not guilty but changed his plea to guilty of a single Neutrality Act violation. He claimed the matter was simply a business transaction and that he had maintained his loyalty to his adopted country. However, before the sentencing, a German naval officer's diary was seized, which placed the Honolulu consulate in an incriminating light. Rodiek was found guilty, and fined $10,000. He subsequently received a presidential pardon, but sold his house and moved to San Francisco.

== See also ==
- Annie Larsen affair
