= Hindu–German Conspiracy Trial =

1917 U.S. federal trial of Indian nationalist conspirators

The Hindu–German Conspiracy Trial commenced in the U.S. District Court in San Francisco on November 12, 1917, following the uncovering of the Hindu–German Conspiracy (also known as the Indo-German plot) for initiating a revolt in British India. It was part of a wave of such incidents which took place in the United States after its entrance into World War I. The trials came after pressure from the United Kingdom to suppress the Indian independence movement abroad.

In May 1917, a group of Indian nationalists of the Ghadar Party were indicted by a federal grand jury on charges of conspiring to form a military enterprise against the United Kingdom from the United States, and violating US neutrality laws. The trial lasted from November 20, 1917, to April 24, 1918, and resulted in the convictions of 29 people, including 14 Indian nationalists. The British authorities hoped the conviction of the Indians would result in their deportation back to India.

Had the nationalists been deported to India, they would have faced much harsher sentences, including execution. The Lahore Conspiracy Case trial in British India, which sparked the trials in the United States, resulted in the convictions of 291 Indian nationalists, of which 42 were executed and 114 received life terms. In contrast, the Indian nationalists convicted in the San Francisco trial received prison terms ranged from 30 days to 22 months.

Ultimately, strong public sympathy in favor of the Indians resulted in the US Department of Justice choosing not to deport them.

== Background ==
From 1915 to 1917, the British government repeatedly requested that the United States government suppress the activities of Ghadar Party in the US. However, these requests were turned down, as nothing in US law prevented the Indians from seeking to overthrow the British government. The British ambassador, Cecil Spring Rice, was reluctant to press the matter diplomatically, fearing the political fallout at a time when Britain was working to end US neutrality and bring it into the war on the side of the Allies. Shortly before the outbreak of World War I, the Ghadar intellectual, Har Dayal, was arrested for anarchist activities and left the US before he could be deported. With other Indian Nationalists in Europe, he enlisted the aid of Germany, who believed supporting a revolt in India would weaken the United Kingdom. In 1915, Germany offered the Indian nationalists financial aid for transporting arms and Indians back to India via the United States.

The British government claimed that the United States was violating its neutrality with Britain by allowing Germany to conspire with the Indians on American soil. The first of several arrests of the Indian nationalists were made in the spring of 1917 with one hundred and five people of various nationalities being arrested. Eventually, thirty-five were tried for conspiracy, including nine Germans, nine Americans, and seventeen Indians.

During the war, nativists in the United States were expressing hostility toward certain minority groups (especially radicals and recent immigrants), viewing anything un-American with suspicion. By 1917, Germans were the object of much American nativist fervor. Fear of German subversion and conspiracies ran rampant throughout the US after the Black Tom explosion and the Kingsland explosion, both suspected to have been caused by German agents. Thus by being linked to Germany in a conspiracy, the Indian Nationalists should have been the recipients of the same hostility. Although calls for their deportation were made by government officials after the Hindu-German conspiracy trial, none of the Indian Nationalists were deported.

=== The arrests ===
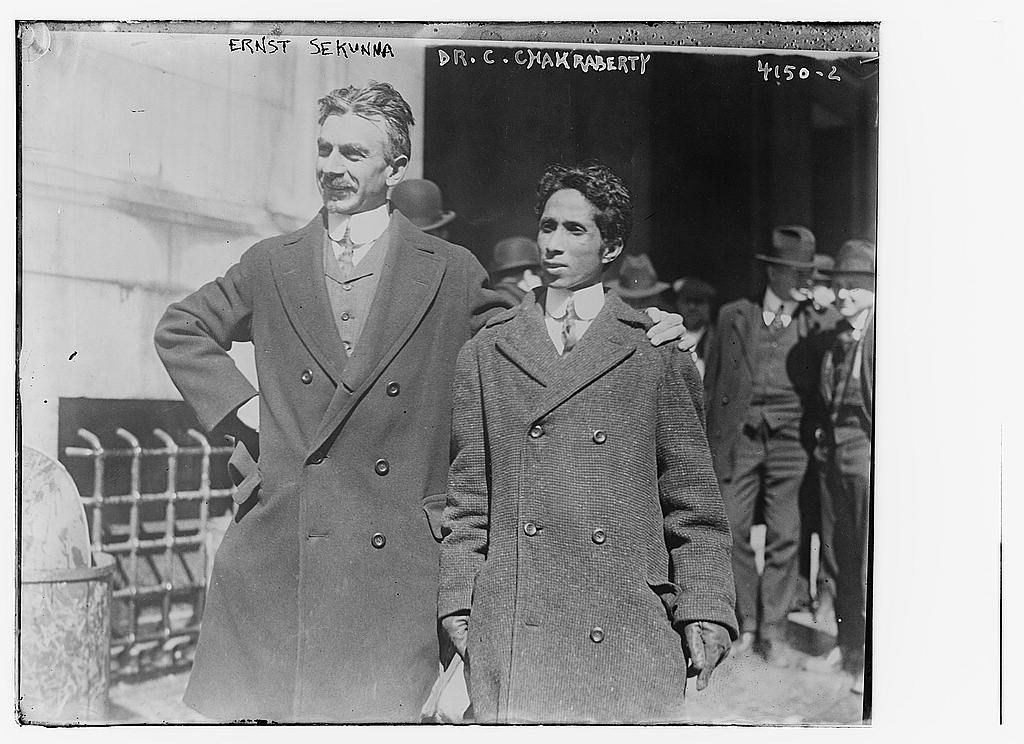
Ernst Sekunna and Chandra Chakraverty

The arrests started in March 1917, with Chandra Kanta Chakraverty "a thin-faced, falsetto-voiced Hindu, a native of Bengal, and a speaker of many languages", and the German, Ernst Sekunna, being arrested on charges of conspiracy. Most of the others were arrested on April 8, including Franz Bopp, the German Consul General for San Francisco, E. H. von Schack, Deus Dekker and Wilhelm von Brincken. The Indian Nationalists were accused of taking "advantage of American neutrality to plot on American soil against the allies" at "the expense of the laws and hospitality of the United States". The two men had also taken out trade names to do business as The Oriental Society, The Oriental Kitchen, and the Oriental Review, and purchased 200 acres (0.81 km^{2}) of land in an isolated part of New York State.

== The trial ==
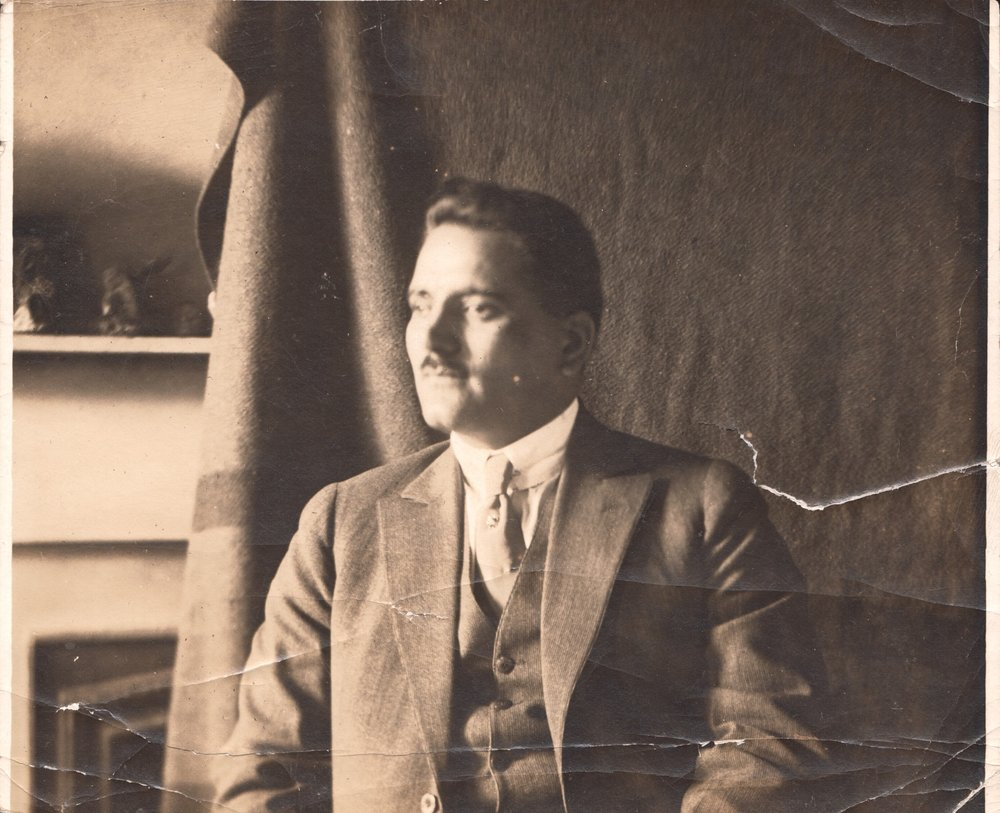
Bhai Bhagwan Singh around the time of his arrest in San Francisco in connection with the Hindu-German Conspiracy of 1917

The Hindu German conspiracy trial started in San Francisco on November 20, 1917. Despite attempts to focus on the machinations of the German agents, the Indians presented their position in terms of the ideals of the American Revolution. As the trial started, Jodh Singh, an Indian "whose testimony sent nine men, including his brothers to their death and condemned a score to life imprisonment in the Far East," pleaded with the court for an American square deal. The British had brought Singh to the United States to testify against his fellow Indian Nationalists. He pleaded guilty to the conspiracy charges and was to be a government witness in this trial. But when he took the witness stand, he suddenly refused to testify. He asked to change his plea to stand trial with his "brothers" in an American court. The judge refused his request.

The San Francisco Chronicle described the courtroom during the testimony of one of the government witnesses:

The tense scene found its climax when four or five of the Hindoo defendants rose to their feet shouting, "That is not right—it is wrong," when Interpreter Gould translated one of the witness' answers. "Sit down—keep your seats," ordered Judge Van Fleet, "the Court will protect your rights—" "Have justice—this is a farce—give us justice," cried the Hindoos as deputy marshals started toward them. Your counsel will protect your rights," said Judge Van Fleet ... "But your honor," replied Bhagwan Singh, one of the alleged chief defendants, "our counsel cannot understand our language."

The Indians were placed into custody for the remainder of the trial following claims that they had been harassing witnesses by following them and attempting to bribe them. When Dr. Chakraverty's extensive confession was delivered, "the diminutive Hindoo was the target for dark glances from this fellow defendants, the subject of excited whisperings and the recipient of several notes from the Hindoos." One of the defendants even stuffed a wad of paper down Chakraverty's neck. To these notes and "to the dark scowls of his countrymen, Chakraverty responded with a broad grin." Chakraverty was followed by several of the Hindu defendants when he left court.

A woman who gave evidence in the trial described how she had met two of the Ghadar activists, Taraknath Das and Har Dayal, when all three were at Stanford University. One wanted to "transform her into a modern Joan of Arc, leading the Indians in intrigue against the British." The other wished to "inspire her to be an idealist and a teacher in India." Evidence was also produced of money paid to two American women by Har Dayal in an attempt to "lure women to Europe to assist the revolutionists." The prosecution also suggested that Taraknath Das had used Camille de Berri, to store a bomb manual in her safety deposit box. When she was finally located she was revealed to be the Oakland divorcee of a wealthy mining expert and who had recently remarried. Her new husband had been suspended from the University of California, upon graduating, for petty pilfering from gymnasium lockers. De Berri had come to his rescue by heading a special investigating committee to look into the affair and then by testifying as an alibi witness for him.

The defense attorney attempted to argue the accused's beliefs placed them squarely within American ideals. The opening address to the jury denounced the British Government's rule in India, declaring that the whole case was being tried at the initiation of Britain. Copies of Ram Chandra's Ghadar Party paper were produced quoting liberty appeals by Patrick Henry, George Washington, Abraham Lincoln, and President Woodrow Wilson.

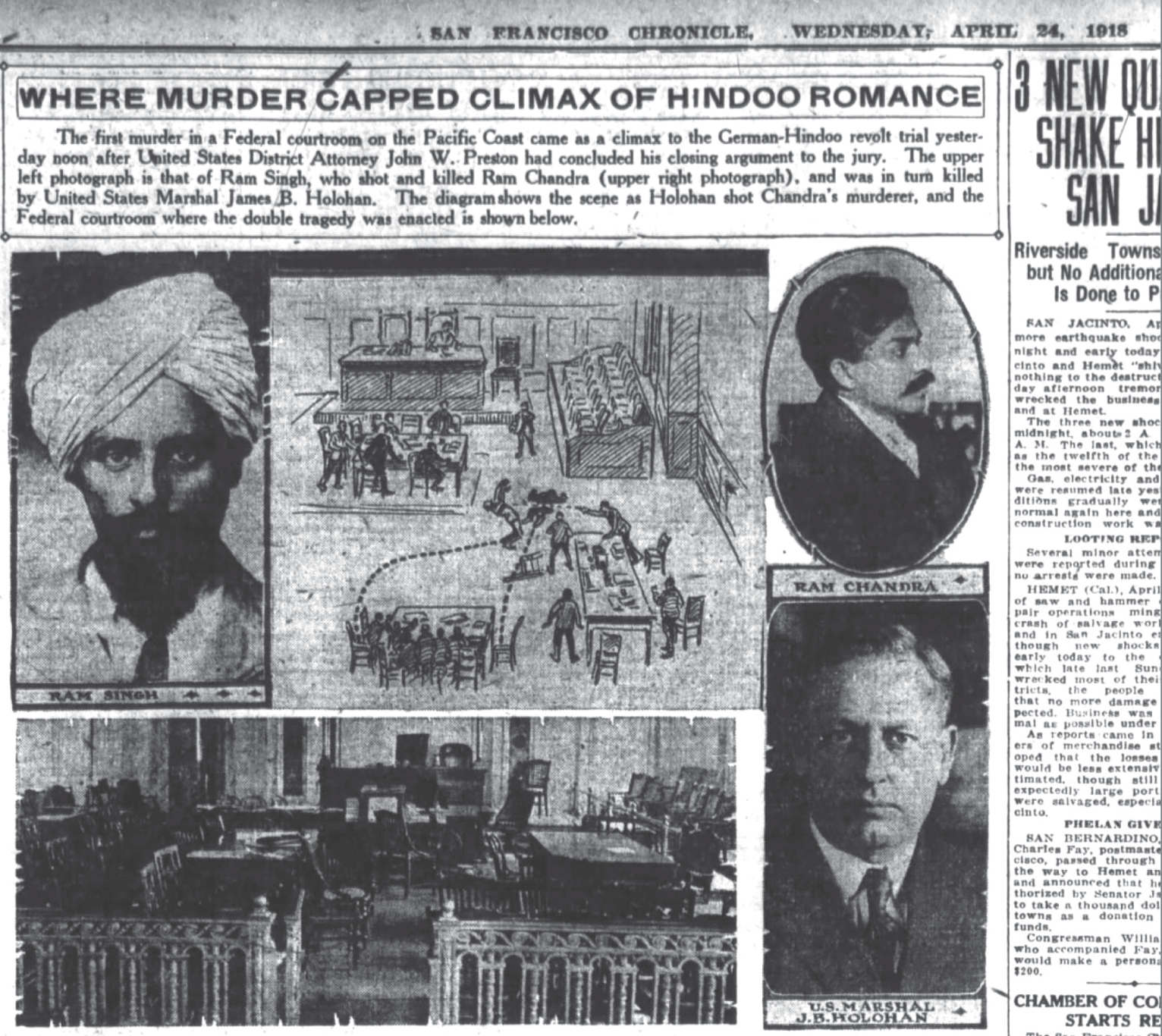
News report on the trial in San Francisco Chronicle; April 24, 1918

The trial ended with a sensational climax when Ram Chandra Bharadwaj, one of the main accused, was shot to death in the courtroom by fellow defendant, Ram Singh. The New York Times described the incident, which occurred just after the court announced a recess:

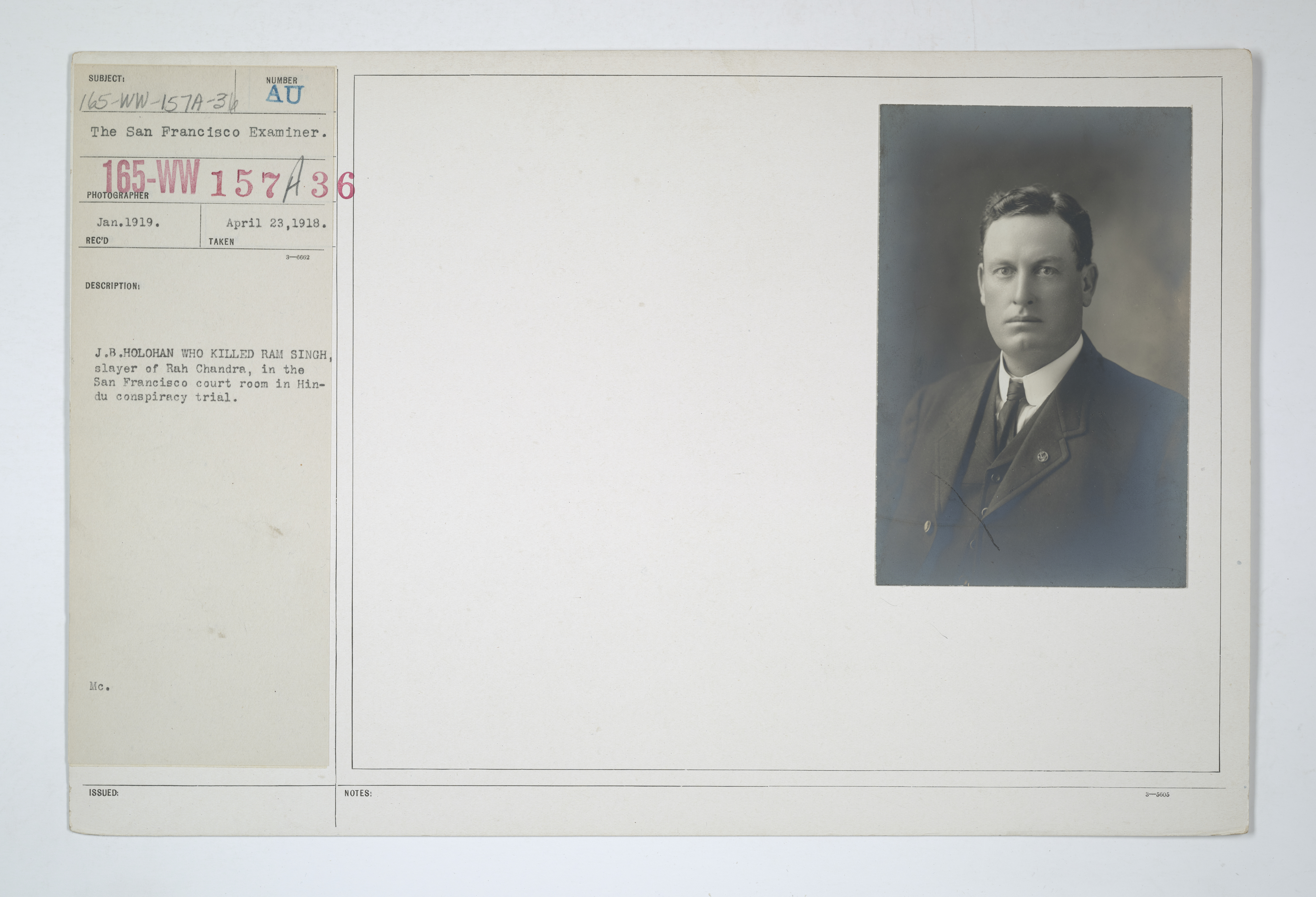
US Marshal James H. Holohan

Ram Chandra arose and started across the room. Ram Singh also arose. He raised his revolver and began firing. Ram Chandra staggered forward and fell dead before the witness chair, with a bullet in his heart and two others in his body! While Singh still pressed the trigger of his automatic pistol, he, too, was shot and killed by United States Marshal James H. Holohan, who fired across the room over the heads of attorneys.

Chandra had been murdered because it was believed he had been diverting nationalists' funds to his own use. A week later, the judge found the defendants guilty of violating the neutrality of the United States. The Indians, "students and revolutionists, several of them highly educated" were sentenced to prison terms ranging from 30 days to twenty-two months.

== See also ==
- George Rodiek
