= Zoë Fairbairns =

English feminist writer (born 1948)

- Born: Zoë Ann Fairbairns; 20 December 1948 (age 77); Tonbridge, England
- Education: University of St Andrews; College of William and Mary
- Occupation: Writer
- Website: zoefairbairns.co.uk

Zoë Ann Fairbairns (born 20 December 1948) is an English feminist writer who has authored novels, short stories, radio plays and political pamphlets.

== Biography ==
Fairbairns was born in 1948 in Tonbridge, Kent, England. She attended St Catherine's School, Twickenham, and went on to study at St Andrews University, Scotland, and the College of William and Mary, in the United States.

Fairbairns was the poetry editor for Spare Rib magazine, in the same decade working as part of a collective of women writers to produce Tales I Tell My Mother. Fairbairns has worked as a freelance journalist and a creative writing tutor; she has also held appointments as Writer in Residence at Bromley Schools (1981–83 and 1985–89), Deakin University, Geelong, Australia (1983), Sunderland Polytechnic (1983–85) and Surrey County Council (1989). More recently she has worked as a subtitler and audio describer. She lives in South London and currently teaches Creative Writing at City Lit.

== Fiction ==
Fairbairns is best known for her novels, especially Benefits (1979), Stand We at Last (1983), Here Today (1984) and Closing (1987).

Live as Family (1968), Fairbairns' debut, was published when the author was just 19 years old. A contemporary re-working of the Jane Eyre idea, it brought Fairbairns significant attention. Down (1969) has a first-person male narrator; it was followed by Benefits (1979), a dystopia imagining life in Britain in the future, with a political party in power that has undone the work of feminism and returned women to the home. Benefits has been compared to Margaret Atwood's later The Handmaid's Tale. Stand We at Last (1983) is a historical novel written from a feminist perspective; it politically subverts the form of the family saga, in the same way that Here Today (1984) is a crime novel, while pushing the genre to its limits. This novel asks questions about female identity in the contemporary world, and depicts the marginalisation of "temps" owing to new technology. Closing (1987) traces the lives of women who meet at a sales training course, and argues that capitalism can have benefits for the women's movement. The three 1980s novels were commercially successful, and Here Today won the Fawcett Book Prize. Daddy's Girls (1991) is, like Stand We At Last, a family saga that spotlights women in society, but in a more recent world. Other Names (1998) shows the effects of both the Lloyd's financial crisis, and a typical philanderer, on two women of different generations.

After the publication of Daddy's Girls, Fairbairns went through a period of debilitating writer's block. She regrouped sufficiently to complete Other Names, but this remains her last published novel. She has continued to write in shorter forms.

== Themes, influences ==
Fairbairns' work generally embraces realism, and much of it is set in the contemporary world, with an authentic material and economic backdrop. She authentically reproduces dialogue, and focuses on her characters' jobs. A feminist writer, she has women as the lead characters in almost all her work. The settings and themes of her novels link her to Fay Weldon, Pat Barker, Margaret Drabble and Doris Lessing.

== Other writings ==
Zoë Fairbairns has also focused on the short story as a form. This began with her work as a collective contributor to Tales I Tell My Mother and More Tales I Tell My Mother; she published her own collection, How Do You Pronounce Nulliparous (2004), and Write Short Stories and Get Them Published (2011). She has written pamphlets for CND, Shelter, and the feminist publishers Raw Nerve; a radio play (The Belgian Nurse, 2007); introductions to novels; interviews with authors including Fay Weldon and Jo Nesbo for Books Magazine; and fiction reviews for newspapers.

== Works ==
=== Novels ===
- Live as Family (1968)
- Down: An Explanation (1969)
- Benefits (1979)
- Stand We at Last (1983)
- Here Today (1984)
- Closing (1987)
- Daddy's Girls (1991)
- Other Names (1998)

=== Short stories ===
- 1978 : "Bus Ticket", "Acts of Violence", and "You Only Have to Say", in Tales I Tell My Mother: A Collection of Feminist Short Stories, edited collectively (Journeyman)
- 1985 : "Spies for Peace", in Voices: From Arts for Labour, edited by Nicki Jackowska (Pluto Press)
- 1987 : "I Was a Teenage Novelist", "Mrs Morris Changes Lanes", and "Lots of Love", in More Tales I Tell My Mother: Feminist Short Stories, edited collectively (Journeyman)
- 1987 : "Relics", in Despatches from the Frontiers of the Female Mind, edited by Jen Green and Sarah Lefanu (The Women's Press)
- 1988 : "Covetousness", in The Seven Deadly Sins, edited by Alison Fell (Serpent's Tail)
- 1990 : "Fortitude", in The Seven Cardinal Virtues, edited by Alison Fell (Serpent's Tail)
- 1991 : "Red Riding Hood", in Cinderella On the Ball: Fairytales for Feminists, edited collectively (Attic)
- 1992 : "The de Montfort Essay Cup", in The Man Who Loved Presents: Seasonal Stories, edited by Alison Campbell et al. (The Women's Press)
- 1992 : "Neck and Neck", in Serious Hysterics, edited by Alison Fell (Serpent's Tail)
- 1995 : "By the Light of the Silvery Moon", in By the Light of the Silvery Moon: Short Stories to Celebrate the 10th Birthday of Silver Moon Women's Bookshop, edited by Ruth Petrie (Virago)
- 1998 : "The Rules", on BBC Radio 4 as part of Tales We Tell (broadcast)
- 2003 : "Bus Ticket Revisited", in the Mechanics' Institute Review (web)
- 2003 : "Stop the City", on BBC Radio 4 as part of The Double Helix (broadcast)
- 2004 : How Do You Pronounce Nulliparous? selected stories (Five Leaves)
- 2005 : "One of the Family", on BBC Radio 4 (broadcast)
- 2007 : "Boot Camp", in Quality Women's Fiction 50, edited by Kathie Giorgio (QWF)
- 2007 : "Pink Mist", in Tales of Psychotherapy, edited by Jane Ryan (Karnac)
- 2007 : "Daffodil Dell", on BBC Radio 4 as part of Last Night I Dreamt (broadcast)
- 2008 : "Decisions", in the literary magazine The Yellow Room, edited by Jo Derrick (QWF)
- 2012 : "North and South", at Smoke, A London Peculiar (web)
- 2013 : "In the Loop", at Tube Flash (web)
- 2014 : "Transubstantiation", at Tube Flash (web)
- 2014 : "The Girls' Tea Rota", in Nutshell 4 (web)
