= Obscenity trial of Ulysses in The Little Review =

1921 U.S. obscenity trial

The obscenity trial over the publication of James Joyce's Ulysses in The Little Review, an American literary magazine, occurred in 1921 and effectively banned publication of Joyce's novel in the United States. After The Little Review published the "Nausicaa" episode of Ulysses in the April 1920 issue of the magazine, the New York Society for the Suppression of Vice instigated obscenity charges against Little Review editors Margaret Caroline Anderson and Jane Heap. The editors were found guilty under laws associated with the Comstock Act of 1873, which made it illegal to send materials deemed obscene through the U.S. Mail. Anderson and Heap incurred a $100 fine, and were forced to cease publishing Ulysses in The Little Review.

== Precedents in obscenity law ==
The legal concepts of obscenity underpinning Anderson and Heap's trial go back to a standard first established in the 1868 English case of Regina v. Hicklin. In this case, Lord Chief Justice Cockburn defined the "test of obscenity" as "whether the tendency of the matter charged as obscenity is to deprave and corrupt those whose minds are open to such immoral influences, and into whose hands a publication of this sort may fall."

This standard, known as the Hicklin test, influenced American jurisprudence, first in United States v. Bennett (1879), upholding a court charge based upon the Hicklin obscenity test and allowing the test to be applied to passages of a text and not necessarily a text in its entirety. The Hicklin test was endorsed by the U.S. Supreme Court in Rosen v. United States in 1896 and was adhered to by American courts well into the twentieth century.

In 1873, after the lobbying attempts of Anthony Comstock, head of New York Society for the Suppression of Vice, the U.S. Congress amended a pre-existing law and enacted the Comstock Act, which made it a crime to knowingly mail obscene materials or advertisements and information about obscene materials, abortion, or contraception. This act adopted the Hicklin test for deeming which materials would be considered obscene.

== Background ==
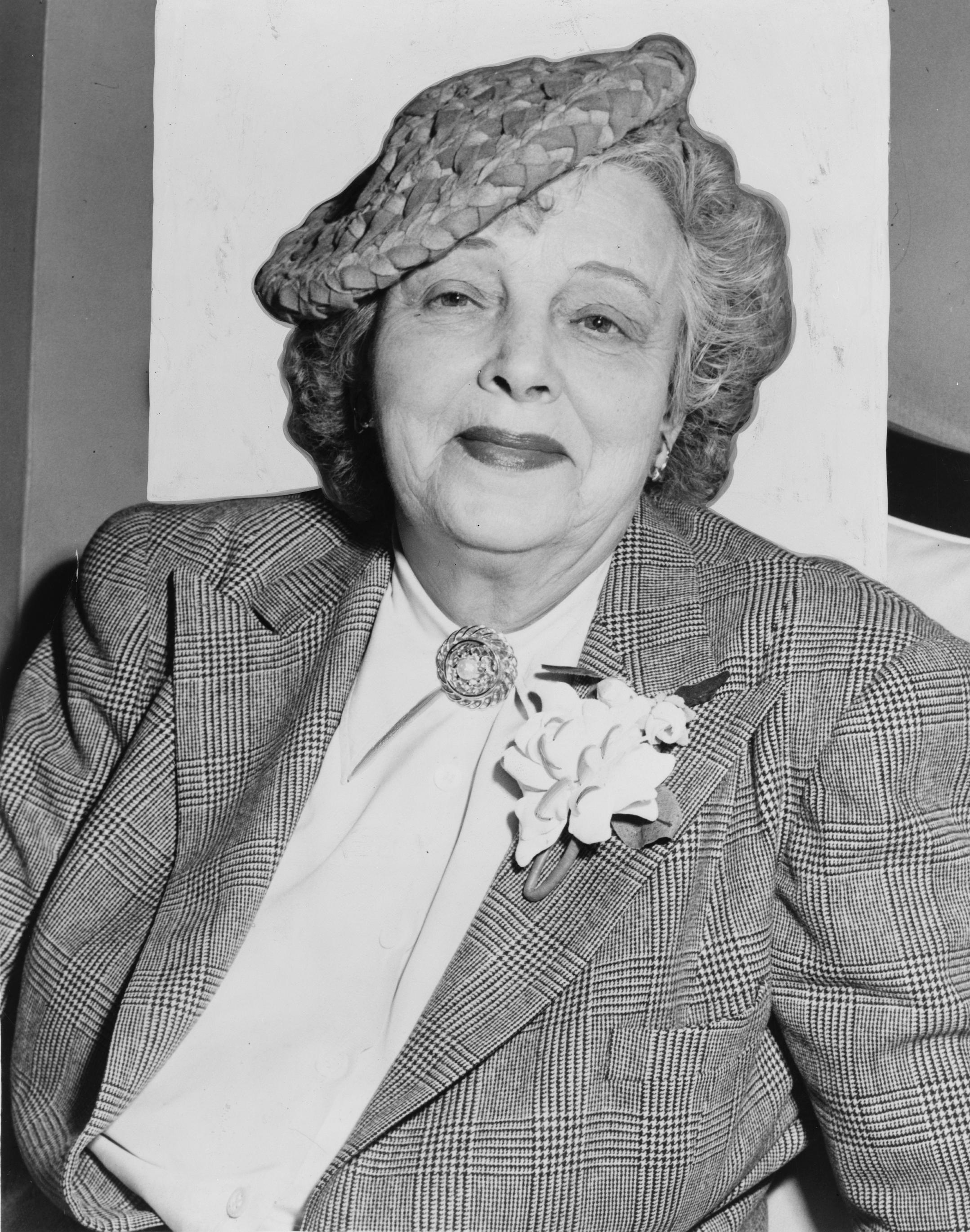
Margaret Anderson, one of the defendants (1953 photo)

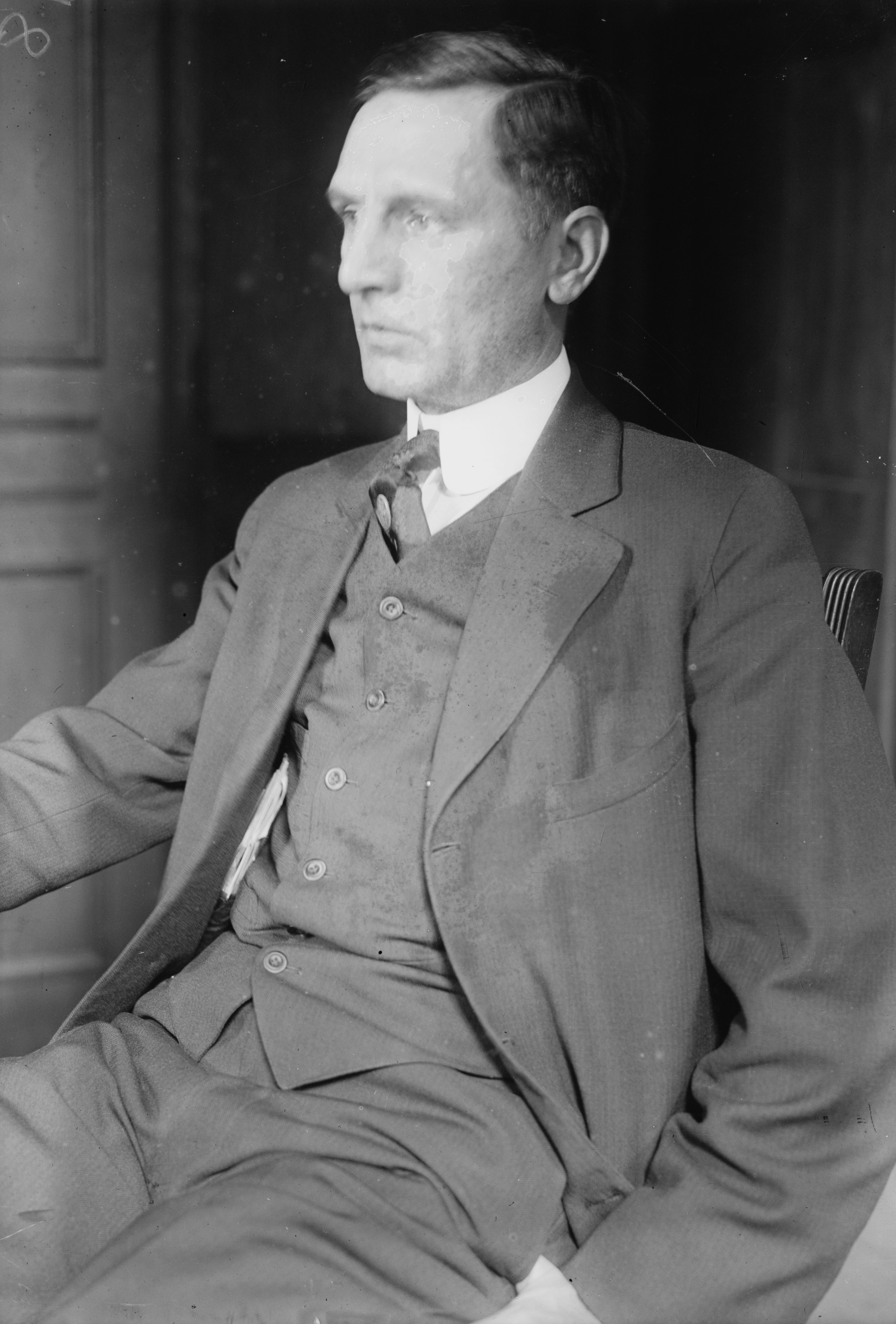
John Sumner, instigator of, and witness for, the prosecution (1915 photo)

The U.S. Post Office confiscated the October 1917 issue of The Little Review due to the publication of Wyndham Lewis' story "Cantleman's Springmate", which focuses on a young, disillusioned soldier who, while awaiting deployment to the front lines of World War I, seduces a young girl and afterwards ignores her letters informing him of her pregnancy. The story was seized due to its perceived sexual lewdness and anti-war sentiments which were thought to violate the Comstock Act prohibiting "obscene, lewd, or lascivious" material from being mailed. John Quinn, a successful lawyer and patron of the arts who was benefactor to both The Little Review and Ezra Pound, the magazine's foreign editor at the time, believed the magazine to have been suppressed due to editors Anderson and Heap's support of anarchists Emma Goldman and Alexander Berkman and anti-war statements they published in New York newspapers. Their support of radical political figures had already led to their eviction from their New York studio office.

Following this suppression, it was difficult for Anderson and Heap to find a New York printer willing to print episodes of Ulysses. When they found a printer, The Little Review began its serialization of Ulysses, publishing the first episode from the work in March, 1918. Following this first publication of Ulysses, three issues of The Little Review were seized and burned by the U.S. Post Office on the grounds that its prose was deemed 'obscene'. The January 1919 issue which contained the "Lestrygonians" episode of Ulysses was the first that was seized; the May 1919, which contained "Scylla and Charybdis," was second; and the January 1920 issue, which contained the "Cyclops" episode, was third.

In 1920, a New York attorney whose daughter had received an unsolicited copy of The Little Review issue brought it to the attention of John S. Sumner, secretary of the New York Society for the Suppression of Vice. Sumner lodged a complaint that September, and on October 4 Anderson and Heap were arrested and charged with obscenity for publishing "Nausicaa" in the April 1920 issue of The Little Review. This episode was an account of protagonist Leopold Bloom fantasizing about a young girl named Gerty MacDowell who leans back to expose herself to Bloom. The scene culminates in Bloom's orgasm, which legal historian Edward de Grazia, in Girls Lean Back Everywhere, argues would have likely escaped the average reader's notice due to Joyce's metaphorical language.

== Trial ==
The trial was held in February 1921 before three judges in a court of special sessions. It considered only the "Nausicaa" episode of Ulysses, with particular attention on Bloom's orgasm and Gerty's role as co-actor. The prosecutor was Joseph Forrester, Assistant District Attorney, and his only witness was John Sumner. John Quinn represented Anderson and Heap, though both disagreed with him over which approach would make the most appropriate defense. Quinn maintained that Anderson and Heap should remain quiet and not testify, so as to present themselves as modest, inconspicuous and conservative women.

Though not required by law, Quinn decided to produce three literary experts to attest to the literary merits of Ulysses, as well as The Little Review's broader reputation. The first expert witness was Philip Moeller, of the Theatre Guild, who interpreted Ulysses using the Freudian method of unveiling the subconscious mind, which prompted one of the judges to ask him to "speak in a language that the court could understand". The next witness was Scofield Thayer, editor of The Dial, another literary magazine of the time, who "was forced to admit that if he had had the desire to publish Ulysses he would have consulted a lawyer first—and not published it". The final witness was English novelist, lecturer, and critic John Cowper Powys, who declared that Ulysses was a "beautiful piece of work in no way capable of corrupting the minds of young girls".

During the trial, the assistant district attorney announced that he would read the offending passage aloud to the court, a proposition to which one judge objected. The judge believed such indecent material "should not be read in the presence of a young woman such as Anderson". In her autobiography, My Thirty Years' War, Anderson writes: "regarding me with protective paternity, [the judge] refused to allow the obscenity to be read in my hearing". When it was pointed out to the judge that Anderson was the publisher, he declared that he was sure "she didn't know the significance of what she was publishing". Following this, the offending passage of Ulysses was read aloud, and the court recessed for one week so that judges could read the entire "Nausicaa" episode.

Quinn's argument against the obscenity charges was based upon claims that the prurient material in Ulysses was actually a deterrent rather than a pernicious influence. He made further arguments that one needed to be acquainted with the city of Dublin to truly understand the work and that the sporadic punctuation, and the perceived incomprehensibility of the novel, was due to Joyce's poor eyesight. At one point in the trial Quinn confessed that "I myself do not understand Ulysses—I think Joyce has carried his method too far," whereupon one of the presiding judges replied, "Yes, it sounds to me like the ravings of a disordered mind—I can't see why anyone would want to publish it".

In accordance with obscenity precedents set by United States v. Bennett, the panel of three judges decided that the passages from the "Nausicaa" episode did indeed constitute obscenity and thereby violated the Comstock laws. Anderson and Heap were found guilty of the charge of obscenity and were forced to discontinue publishing any further episodes from Ulysses, have their fingerprints taken, and pay a fine of one hundred dollars.

== Aftermath and responses ==
The Little Review ceased its serialization of Ulysses, with "Oxen of the Sun" being the last episode of the novel to be featured in the magazine—roughly the first third of that episode appears in the magazine's August 1920 issue. Anderson and Heap were required to restrict the magazine's content to less inflammatory material, eventually removing their motto "Making No Compromise with the Public Taste" from the magazine's cover page in 1921. Disheartened by the trial, the lack of support from the intellectual community, and the future outlook for art in America, Anderson considered ceasing to publish The Little Review, and eventually ceded control of the magazine to Heap. The Little Review continued to be published until 1929.

In her article "Art and the Law," written after being served with obscenity allegations but before the ensuing trial, Heap pointed out the irony of being prosecuted for printing the thoughts of the character Gerty MacDowell, "an innocent, simple, childish girl," in attempts to protect the minds of young women. Heap first asks "If the young girl corrupts, can she also be corrupted?" and goes on to quip, "If there is anything I really fear it is the mind of the young girl". She also argued that:

Mr. Joyce was not teaching early Egyptian perversions nor inventing new ones. Girls lean back everywhere, showing lace and silk stockings; wear low-cut sleeveless blouses, breathless bathing suits; men think thoughts and have emotions about these things everywhere—seldom as delicately and imaginatively as Mr. Bloom—and no one is corrupted. Can merely reading about the thoughts he thinks corrupt a man when his thoughts do not?

Although the trial was ostensibly concerned with the "Nausicaa" episode, a number of scholars, such as Holly Baggett, Jane Marek and Adam Parkes, argue that it was motivated against the iconoclastic character of the magazine and its "politically radical lesbian" editors. Though Quinn defended Anderson and Heap in the trial, in his letters to Ezra Pound, Quinn expressed distaste for his defendants. In a letter from October 16, 1920, Quinn wrote, "I have no interest at all in defending people who are stupidly and brazenly and Sapphoistically and pederastically and urinally, and menstrually violat[ing] the law, and think they are courageous". Anderson and Heap faced not only a hostile prosecution and judges indifferent to the literary merits of Ulysses, but also a defense attorney who, in some ways, sided with the prosecution. In Baroness Elsa: Gender, Dada and Everyday Modernity: A Cultural Biography, Irene Gammel argues that the trial was ultimately a battle over women's issues and the paternalist functions of obscenity laws at the time . Gammel asserts that Baroness Elsa von Freytag-Loringhoven, a prolific contributor of poetry to The Little Review, became the magazine's figurehead in a fight for authority in determining the subject matter women should be able to write about and read. Gammel writes, "If Heap was the field marshall for The Little Review's vanguard battle against puritan conventions and traditional sexual aesthetics, then the Baroness was to become its fighting machine".

Though effectively banned in the United States, Ulysses was published in Paris by Sylvia Beach in 1922, one year after the trial. Not until the 1933 case United States v. One Book Called Ulysses could the novel be published in the United States without fear of prosecution.
