= Girls Lean Back Everywhere =

1992 book by Edward de Grazia

Girls Lean Back Everywhere: The Law of Obscenity and the Assault on Genius
- Author: Edward de Grazia
- Language: English
- Genres: Non-fiction
- Published: 1992
- Publisher: Vintage; 2nd Printing edition (March 2, 1993
- Publication place: United States
- Media type: Print
- Pages: 832
- ISBN: 978-0679743415

Girls Lean Back Everywhere: The Law of Obscenity and the Assault on Genius is a book written by American lawyer, Edward de Grazia. It is a book chronicling the history of literary censorship in the United States and elsewhere.

== Contents ==
The book details the history of struggles against literary censorship, particularly in the United Kingdom and the United States of America. As the narrative develops, it turns increasingly to US First Amendment law. It tells the stories of various censorship struggles and cases throughout the twentieth century. The book is dedicated to Justice William Brennan.

The title comes from Jane Heap, discussed in chapter one, which is based on the biographical writings of Heap and Margaret Anderson. Heap and Anderson were American feminists and publishers, who in 1918 published the "Nausicaa" episode of James Joyce's Ulysses in their magazine, The Little Review. Their effort to publish the work was censored as the result of a criminal prosecution instigated by John S. Sumner, Secretary of the New York Society for the Suppression of Vice. In response to Sumner, Heap wrote of James Joyce:

Mr. Joyce was not teaching early Egyptian perversions nor inventing new ones. Girls lean back everywhere, showing lace and silk stockings; wear low-cut sleeveless blouses, breathless bathing suits; men think thoughts and have emotions about these things everywhere—seldom as delicately and imaginatively as Mr. Bloom (in the "Nausicaa" episode)--and no one is corrupted.

Other chapters tell the stories of numerous publishers, authors, and works, including Radclyffe Hall's The Well of Loneliness; D. H. Lawrence's Lady Chatterley's Lover'; Lolita by Vladimir Nabokov; Theodore Dreiser and Émile Zola; and comedian Lenny Bruce, as well as of censor boards and organizations, such as the Boston Watch and Ward Society, the National Vigilance Association, and the Cincinnati Citizens for Community Values. The final chapter covers censorship in the 1980s of photographers Andres Serrano, Robert Mapplethorpe, and Jock Sturges; musicians 2 Live Crew; and performance artists Karen Finley and Holly Hughes.

The book is organized in the form of a court transcript, effectively "put[ting] the arts vigilantes on trial."

== Publication history ==
The first two chapters of the book were published serially in the Cardozo Arts & Entertainment Law Journal.

== Significant reviews and reception ==
The book has been described as "monumental", "authoritative", and "inspired", although sometimes "bloat[ed] ... with facts irrelevant to censorship." Publishers Weekly described the book as a "remarkable tour de force of literary/legal sleuthing".

- Kirkus Reviews, November 15, 1991
- Jacqueline Adams, Library Journal, February 1, 1992, v.117, n.2, p. 111 ("comprehensive but very readable and thought-provoking")
- Frederick Bush, "Under Attack: Girls Lean Back Everywhere ...", Los Angeles Times, March 22, 1993.
- Cait Clarke, Loyola Law Review, Summer 1992, v.38, pp. 541–556.
- Henry Louis Gates, "Book Review: To 'Deprave and Corrupt': Girls Lean Back Everywhere", 38 N.Y.L. Sch. L. Rev. 401 (1993); The Nation, v.254, 898 (1992).
- Yifat Hachamovitch, Cardozo Studies in Law & Literature, Fall 1992, v. 4, pp. 289–304.
- Marjorie Heins, "Book Review: Girls Lean Back Everywhere", 1992 NYU Review of Law & Social Change 933–942.
- Richard H. Pildes, "An Absolute Faith: Review of Girls Lean Back Everywhere", New York Times Book Review, July 26, 1992.
- Publishers Weekly, March 2, 1992 ("a remarkable tour de force")
- Sara Suleri, Yale Review, April 1992, v.80, p. 197.
- Kathleen M. Sullivan, New Republic, September 28, 1992, v.207, p. 35.
- John Sutherland, TLS, June 26, 1992, # 4656, p. 11.* Ronald K. L. Collins, Christian Science Monitor, April 6, 1992, p. 13.
- Norma Basch, American Historical Review, April 1993, v.98, p. 598.
- Anne E. Gilson, Michigan Law Review, May 1993, v.91, pp. 1166–1171.
- Linda Kauffman, Arts & Entertainment Law Journal, 1993, v.11, pp. 765–775.
- Alma Robinson, San Francisco Review of Books, Jan./Feb. 1993, v.18, p. 22.
- Robert M. O'Neil, Cardozo Law Review, April 1994, v.15, pp. 2329–2335.
- Catharine A. MacKinnon, Harvard Civil Rights-Civil Liberties Law Review, Winter 1995, v.30, pp. 143–168.
- Peter E. Kane, Free Speech Yearbook, 1996, v.34, pp. 192–194.
- Catharine A. MacKinnon, "Pornography Left and Right" (review of Sex and Reason by Richard A. Posner and Girls Lean Back Everywhere) in David M. Estlund and Martha Nussbaum, eds., Sex, Preference, and Family: Essays on Law and Nature, New York: Oxford University Press, 1997, pp. 102–125.
