= Homo sapiens (novel) =

1915 trilogy by Stanisław Przybyszewski

Homo Sapiens
- Author: Stanisław Przybyszewski
- Language: German
- Genre: Novel
- Publication date: 1895
- Publication place: Germany
- English publication date: 1915
- Media type: Print

Homo Sapiens (1895–96; tr. 1915 by Thomas Seltzer) is a trilogy by Polish author Stanisław Przybyszewski. The novels were originally published in German as Über Bord (1896, "Overboard"), Unterwegs (1895, "By the Way") and Im Malstrom (1895, "In the Maelstrom"). It deals with the question of deviance and sexuality, and is counted among Przybyszewski's most important and best-known works. It was well received in Germany, but withdrawn from sale by its U.S. publisher after being labelled obscene. It is associated with the decadent movement of the late 19th century.

== Plot ==
The protagonist is a writer, Erik Falk, an émigré from Congress Poland, residing in bohemian Berlin of the early 1890s. The plot of the first novel, Über Bord, revolves around his attempt to steal a fiancée of a friend. In the second novel, Unterwegs, Falk attempts to seduce a pious sixteen-year-old. In the last novel, Im Maelstrom, Falk has to balance his official family and a mistress, both with his children. He also becomes increasingly involved with radical socialist and anarchist circles.

== Reception publication history and censorship controversy ==
The book, with ornate language, describes an individual's destruction through alcoholism and eroticism. The novel is believed to be a roman à clef, portraying the author's own experiences in Berlin and Munich. The book became widely known in Europe, was well-received upon its publication in Germany, and influenced many European youths who were caught up in the fashion of the 'decadent'.

The book was originally written in German. A Polish translation was published in 1901 in Lwów, and an English one, by Thomas Seltzer, in 1915.

Homo Sapiens was originally published as a trilogy: Overboard (Über Bord, 1896), By the Way (Unterwegs, 1895) and In the Maelstrom (Im Malstrom, 1895). The second part was published first by Friedrich Fontane (son of Theodor Fontane); the other two sections were published later by Hugo Storm. It has however been often republished in one volume.

In 1915 Homo Sapiens was published in the United States by Alfred A. Knopf. It was initially praised (for example, by Alexander S. Kaun), but the New York Society for the Suppression of Vice's resistance to the book, led by John S. Sumner, resulted in it being labelled "obscene" and a court case to prevent its distribution. Sumner withdrew his legal complaint after Knopf undertook to melt down the plates used for printing Przybyszewski's book and to withdraw the novel from sale.

Late-20th century critic Martin Seymour-Smith called the work notably Freudian in attitude, also saying Przybyszewski "overwrote badly, characters in his fiction are prone to break into satanic smiles and laughter, and to 'fling' themselves over-willingly into an unconvincingly delightful despair."

== See also ==
- Book censorship in the United States
