= Succès de scandale =

Term meaning "success from scandal"

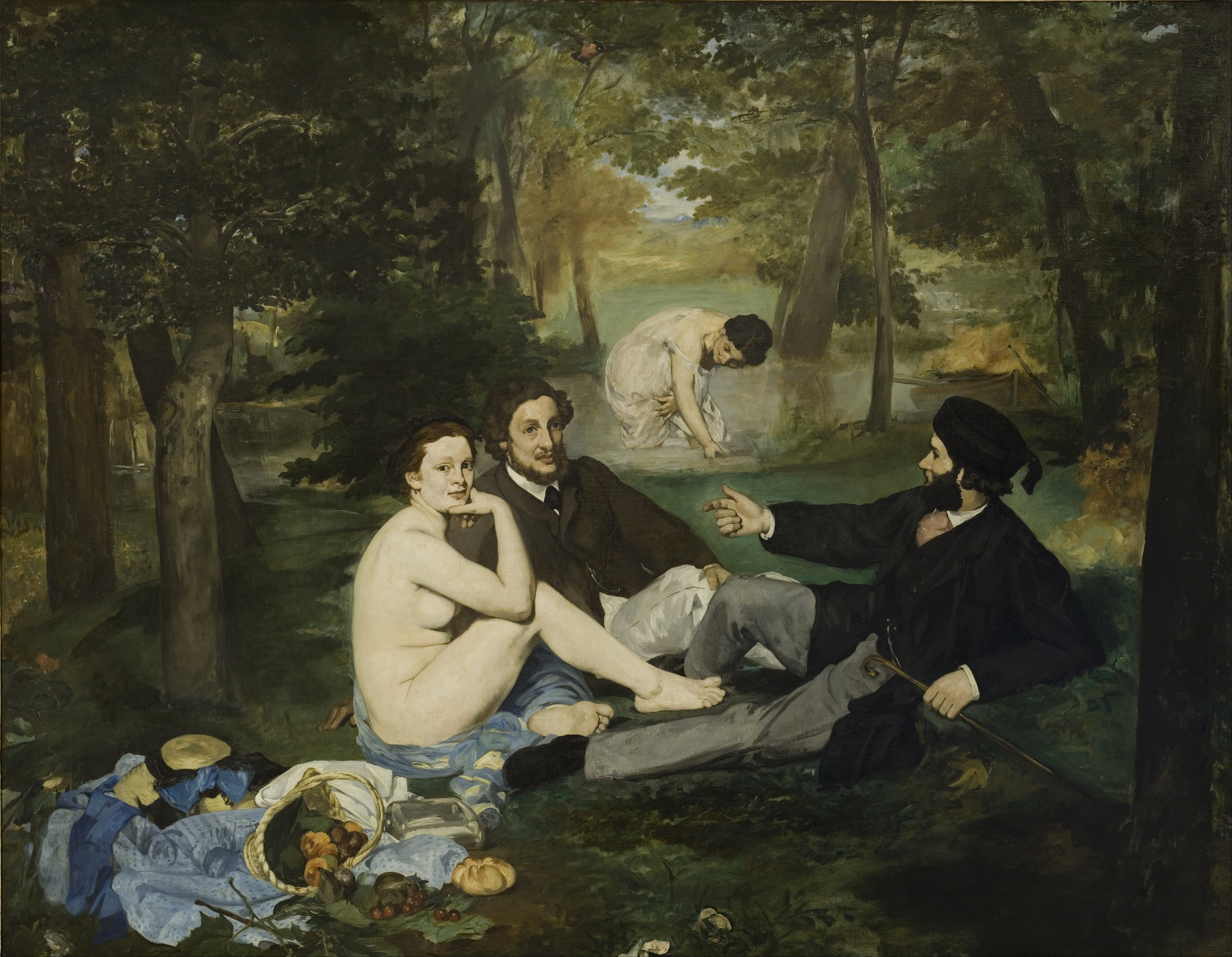
Luncheon on the Grass was one of the first in a series of Parisian succès de scandale.

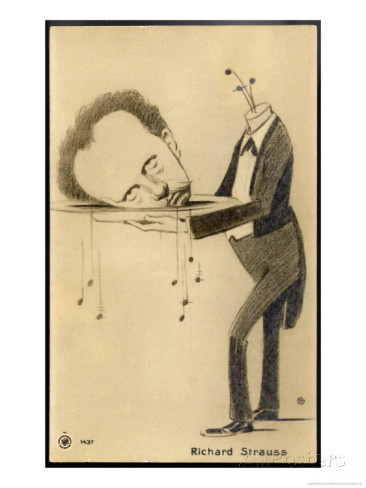
Richard Strauss's head on a silver platter satirizes the decapitation of John the Baptist in his operatic version of Wilde's Salome

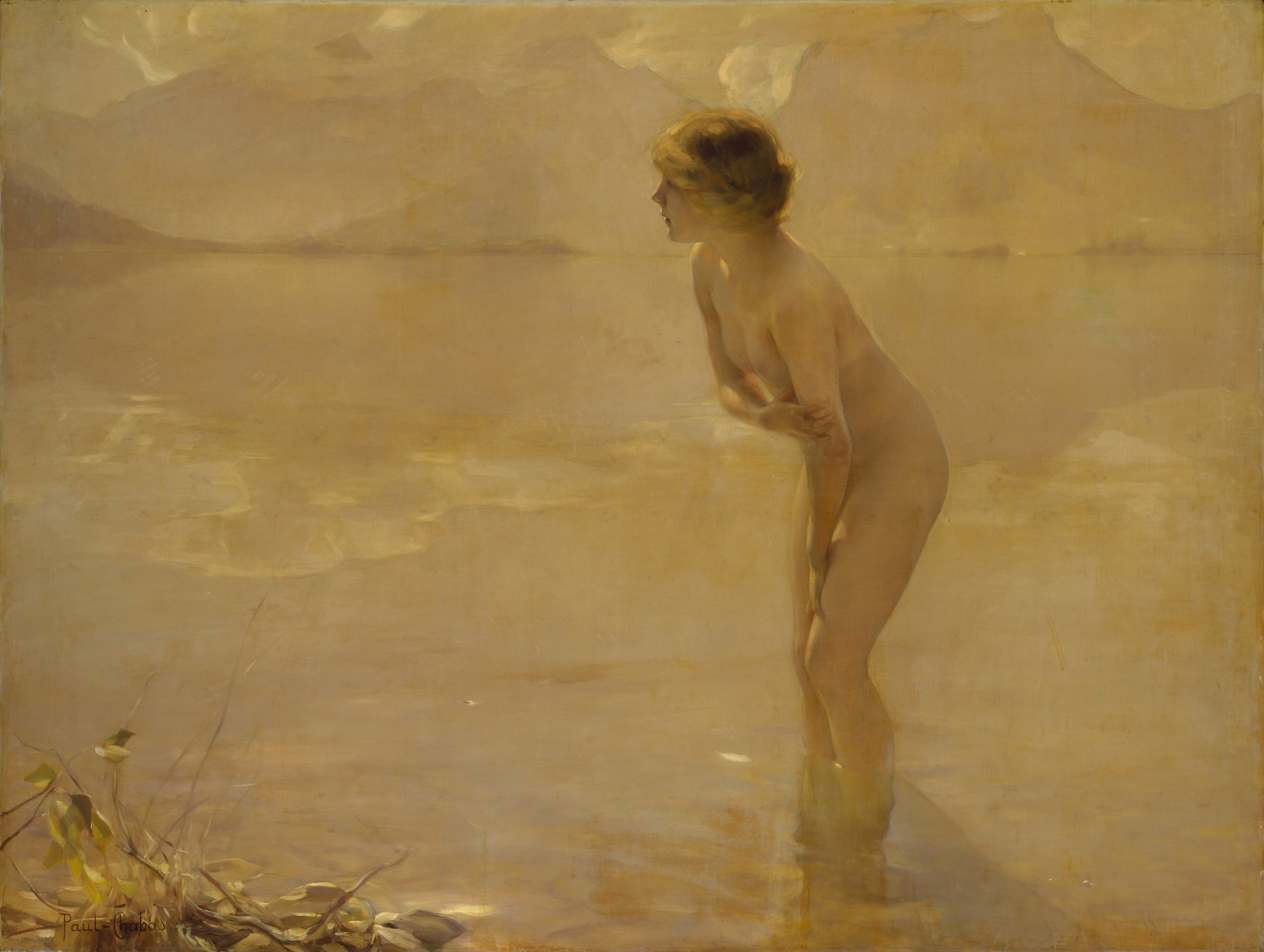
Not a commercial success in Europe, Paul Chabas's September Morn ended up in the permanent collection of the New York Metropolitan Museum of Art, after scandalising Anthony Comstock and his New York Society for the Suppression of Vice.

Succès de scandale (French for "success from scandal") is a term for any artistic work whose success is attributed, in whole or in part, to public controversy surrounding the work. In some cases the controversy causes audiences to seek out the work for its titillating content, while in others it simply heightens public curiosity. In English, this concept is commonly echoed by the phrase "there is no such thing as bad publicity".

== Belle Époque ==
The Belle Époque ('beautiful era') in Paris, roughly from 1871 to 1914, was notable for many succès de scandale. This was also where and when the term originated. In the examples below, artists started their careers with some sort of scandal, with some connection to turn-of-the-century Paris. In other cities, provoking a scandal appeared more risky, as Oscar Wilde found out shortly after his relatively "successful" Parisian scandal (Salomé in 1894, portraying the main character as a necrophile).

- Le déjeuner sur l'herbe ("Luncheon on the Grass") by Édouard Manet, presented at the Salon des refusés, 1863: Even the Emperor was scandalised, but Manet had a nice start to his career.
- Alfred Jarry shocked Paris in 1896 with the first of his absurdistic Ubu plays: Ubu Roi. The performance of this play was forbidden after the first night, though Jarry got around the prohibition by moving the production to a puppet theatre.
- A new group of artists, labeled disrespectfully "Les Fauves" ("The Wild Beasts") by an art critic, had their successful debut in 1905 Paris (and kept the name).
- Richard Strauss had little success with his first two operas, which today are no longer performed. He then tried something different: he set music to Oscar Wilde's Salome in 1905. It created a scandal, including in the New York Met, where the production had to be closed after one night. But Strauss wanted more, and his next opera (Elektra, 1909) was so "noisy" that cartoons appeared with Strauss directing an orchestra of animals. However, the opera's libretto, written by Hugo von Hofmannsthal, was quite tame.
- The 1912 ballet Afternoon of a Faun, choreographed and headed by Vaslav Nijinsky, provoked strong reactions. The newspaper Le Figaro wrote in a front-page review that the "movements are filthy and bestial in their eroticism". Despite, or because of, this criticism, the ballet was sold out in Paris.
- The Rite of Spring (1913)
- The original 1917 production of the ballet Parade.
- George Antheil's 1923 performance of futurist piano music at the Champs-Élysées theater.
- Paul Chabas had won a most prestigious prize with his September Morn in Paris in 1912. Nudity as portrayed in this painting was, however, far from shocking to Parisians half a century after Déjeuner. The market value of the painting remained low. Then, Chabas put it on display in a New York shop window in 1913. There, for the first time in history, it appears a succès de scandale scheme was set up by a publicity agent (Harry Reichenbach), who "accidentally" tipped off a morality crusader to the picture. The scandal that evolved brought financial success and secured Chabas's place in art history books. Although later deemed kitsch, the painting ended up in one of the most prestigious museums of New York.

== Other examples ==
Paul Chabas's September Morn was not the last time that Comstockery fanned the success it wanted to prohibit: Mae West quipped "I believe in censorship. I made a fortune out of it." after the Society for the Suppression of Vice had maneuvered to get her play Sex re-censored by the Police Department Play Jury. A few years later, when she was over 40 years old, her sex-symbol status paid off when by 1933, West was one of the largest box-office draws in the United States and, by 1935, she was also the highest paid woman and the second-highest paid person in the United States (after William Randolph Hearst).

Films qualified as succès de scandale include Louis Malle's 1958 The Lovers, Bernardo Bertolucci's 1972 Last Tango in Paris. and more recently Abdellatif Kechiche's 2013 Blue Is the Warmest Colour. Scandal also boosted the success of writers of modest talent. Even famous writers like Flaubert and Joyce have been described as deploying succès de scandale recipes to their advantage.

== See also ==
- Advertisement
- Cause célèbre
- Épater la bourgeoisie
- Herostratus
- Publicity
- Publicity stunt
- Streisand effect
