= The Little Review Gallery =

Former art gallery in New York City

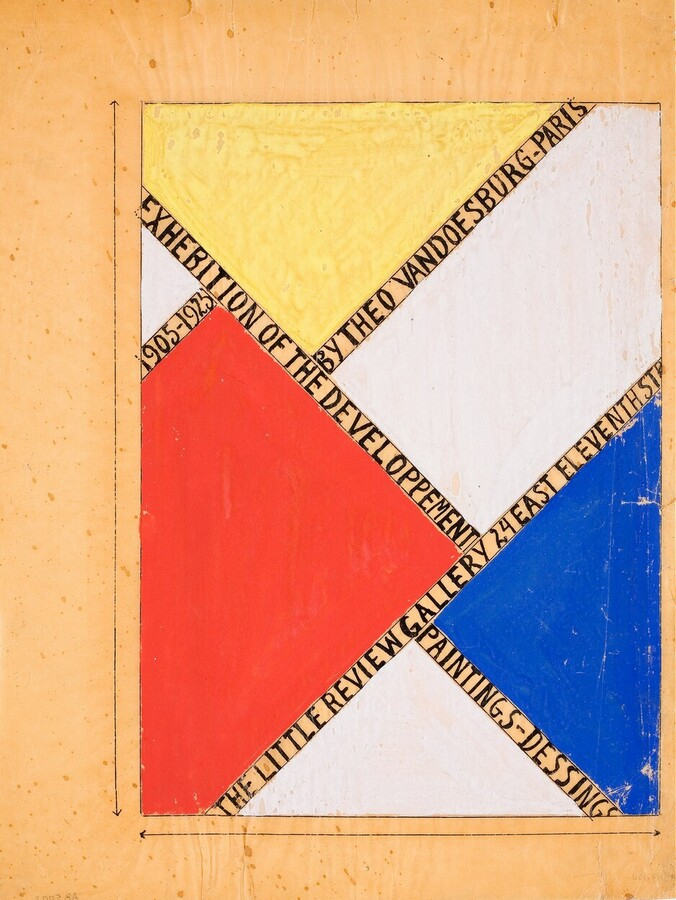
Poster for the Little Review Gallery designed by Theo van Doesburg

The Little Review Gallery was a small Modern Art gallery associated with the magazine American literary magazine The Little Review. The gallery was owned and operated from 1924 to 1927 by Jane Heap, the acting editor of The Little Review at that time. The gallery was primarily devoted to Constructivism, Dadaism, and Machine-inspired art.

It featured "Rayographs" by artist Man Ray, which were created by placing objects on chemically treated paper and then exposing the paper to light. Later that year, the gallery also housed plaster-paper works by Dadaist Kurt Schwitters. Very little record exists of the gallery, which most likely began as the personal art collection of Jane Heap. The gallery's first exhibition was held in the magazine's office at 24 East 11th Street, in January 1924.

In December 1925, the gallery was moved to a larger, more permanent location at 66 Fifth Avenue. The nine-story building was owned by the Sixty-Six Fifth Avenue Corporation and also housed the offices of Creative Art, an art magazine edited by Rockwell Kent, an anti-censorship committee, and the Fifth Avenue Playhouse.

According to an ad which appeared in the New York Tribune on March 29, 1925, The Little Review Gallery was "Founded by artists in the interest of artists" and housed "Paintings—Sculptures—Constructions". During this period (March 10-April 11, 1925), the gallery was only open two times a week: from 2-6 P. M. on Tuesdays and Saturdays. In May 1925, the New York Tribune ran the following review of the Little Review Gallery's exhibit featuring Dutch painter and architect Theo van Doesburg:

It appears that [van Doesburg] began, back in 1902, by following the steps of his most illustrious countryman, Rembrandt. There are several portraits, exceedingly capable ones ... that are listed as his "brown period". ... Then he turned cubist, and finally in 1916, "Constructivist", bent on still more remote investigations of the abstract relations between form and color. In company with his work appears that of Gabo and Pevsner, Russians, who are also introduced as "constructionists". With the aid of wood, metal and celluloid they have wrought, apparently with great pains, a series of curious compositions.

The gallery was only sporadically funded and apparently run single-handedly by Heap—who was also, at that time, also acting as the primary editor of The Little Review. Most of the art shown was by European artists, meaning that the pieces needed to be shipped over long distances before appearing in the gallery. In September 1926, several of Hungarian painter László Moholy-Nagy's original pieces went missing in transit to the Gallery and ended up spending over a year at the New York harbor, never to be put on display.

Heap was incredibly proud of the gallery's internationalism, calling it "the first gallery of its kind" and "the first place the Machine Art movement was shown in America". Throughout her private letters, she almost exclusively referred to the establishment as "my gallery", alternating between excitement about upcoming shows and anxiety over the gallery's lack of funds.

Though they were not housed within the walls of the Little Review Gallery, Heap's two largest and most important exhibitions were the International Theater Exposition of 1926 and the Machine-Age Exposition of 1927. Both events were organized in partnership with the Little Review Gallery, and the full programs for both exhibitions were published within issues of The Little Review.

The Gallery moved again in 1927 to 24 West Fortieth Street, closings its doors later that same year when Jane Heap, who traveled back and forth between New York and Paris during the years of the gallery's operation, settled permanently in Paris.

== Artists exhibited by the Little Review Gallery ==
- Hans Arp
- Hannah Höch
- Ossip Zadkine
- Cedric Morris
- Juan Gris
- Arthur Lett-Haines
- André Masson
- John Storrs
- Joseph Stella
- Charles Demuth
- Naum Gabo
- Antoine Pevsner
- N. Granvosky
