= Thomas Seltzer =

Thomas Seltzer may refer to:

- Thomas Seltzer (translator) (1875–1943), translator and editor of Russian stories
- Thomas Seltzer (musician) (born 1969), also known as Happy-Tom, Norwegian rock musician
