= Beyond Imagining: Margaret Anderson and the 'Little Review' =

1992 film

- Produced by: Wendy L. Weinberg
- Starring: Margaret Caroline Anderson
- Distributed by: Women Make Movies
- Release date: 1992
- Running time: 30 minutes
- Country: United States
- Language: English

Beyond Imagining: Margaret Anderson and the 'Little Review' is a 1992 American short documentary film about Margaret Caroline Anderson, produced by Wendy L. Weinberg. It was nominated for an Academy Award for Best Documentary Short.
