= William Henry Parsons (New York activist) =

William Henry Parsons (1859 – September 21, 1935) headed the New York Society for the Suppression of Vice from 1930 until his death. Previously he had served as the society's treasurer, from 1912-1930. Born in New York City he attended the Park Institute at Rye and then Yale University, graduating in 1882. He was president of Parsons, Whittemore, Inc., an elder at Madison Avenue Presbyterian Church, and a member of the Brooklyn branch of the YMCA. He was married to Laura Wolcott Collins who died in 1928. They had three sons and two daughters.
