= The Little Review =

American literary magazine

The Little Review was an American avant-garde literary magazine founded by Margaret Anderson in Chicago's historic Fine Arts Building, which published literary writing and art from 1914 to May 1929. With the help of Jane Heap and Ezra Pound, Anderson created a magazine that featured a wide variety of transatlantic modernists and cultivated many early examples of experimental writing and art. Many contributors were American, British, Irish, and French. In addition to publishing a variety of international literature, The Little Review printed early examples of surrealist artwork and Dadaism. The magazine's most well-known work was the serialization of James Joyce's Ulysses.

== History ==
Margaret Anderson conceived The Little Review in 1914 during the Chicago Literary Renaissance, naming it in honor of the Chicago Little Theatre, a leader in championing new drama and prime mover in the nascent Little Theatre Movement. In The Little Review’s opening editorial, Anderson called for the creation of a new form of criticism for art, emphasizing, “... criticism as an art has not flourished in this country. We live too swiftly to have time to be appreciative; and criticism, after all, has only one synonym: appreciation”. This philosophy would shape the magazine throughout its fifteen-year run. 1915-1917, Harriet Dean was a fund raiser. In the early years, The Little Review published a variety of literature, essays, and poetry. The magazine advocated themes like feminism and even anarchism for a short time. Emma Goldman was a key figure during The Little Review’s brief affiliation with anarchism: Goldman was a regular contributor and Anderson wrote editorials advocating anarchism and art. In 1916, Heap became the magazine's co-editor and stayed with the magazine until 1929.

In 1916, The Little Review was published, for a while, in San Francisco (after Chicago, for a while, Margaret C. Anderson and Jane Heap published The Little Review out of a ranch in Muir Woods, in southwestern Marin County, California, in the San Francisco Bay Area).

Ezra Pound approached Anderson in late 1916 to help with the magazine, explaining, “[T]he Little Review is perhaps temperamentally closer to what I want done”. Pound became foreign editor in 1917.

In 1917, The Little Review moved to Greenwich Village in New York City, then Margaret C. Anderson took it to Paris.

=== Obscenity trial of Ulysses ===
The magazine serialized James Joyce's Ulysses starting in 1918. The Little Review continued to publish Ulysses until 1921 when the Post Office seized copies of the magazine and refused to distribute them on the grounds that Ulysses constituted obscene material. As a result, the magazine, Anderson, and Heap went to trial over the Ulysses questionable content. John Quinn, a lawyer and well-known patron of modernist art, defended them at the trial, ultimately losing. The editors paid a fifty-dollar fine each as result of the judgment. Anderson briefly considered folding the magazine after the trial.

The trial was discussed in Girls Lean Back Everywhere by First Amendment attorney Edward de Grazia, whose book was titled based on a quote from Jane Heap. In response to John Summer, Secretary of the New York Society for the Suppression of Vice, who initiated the suppression, Heap wrote of James Joyce:

Mr. Joyce was not teaching early Egyptian perversions nor inventing new ones. Girls lean back everywhere, showing lace and silk stockings; wear low-cut sleeveless blouses, breathless bathing suits; men think thoughts and have emotions about these things everywhere--seldom as delicately and imaginatively as Mr. Bloom (in the "Nausicaa" episode)--and no one is corrupted.

Although the obscenity trial was ostensibly about Ulysses, Irene Gammel argues that The Little Review came under attack for its overall subversive tone and, in particular, its publication of the sexually explicit writings of the Baroness Elsa von Freytag-Loringhoven. Heap championed the Baroness's Dada poetry, printing it alongside the serialization of Ulysses from 1918-1921 and making Freytag-Loringhoven the journal's most frequently printed poet. Heap and the Baroness shared a confrontational feminist agenda. Gammel writes, “If Heap was the field marshall for The Little Review's vanguard battle against puritan conventions and traditional sexual aesthetics, then the Baroness was to become its fighting machine”. Following the obscenity trial, Anderson and Heap were forced to restrict the magazine's content to less inflammatory material, and they no longer printed their motto, “Making No Compromise with the Public Taste”.

=== Post-trial ===
In 1923, Anderson and Heap traveled to Paris and met Pound and other literary expatriates during the trip. While The Little Review continued to publish, publication had become irregular during this time. By 1925, after being in Europe for a time, Anderson and Heap parted ways: Heap returned to New York with The Little Review and Anderson remained in Europe. From 1924 to 1927, Heap owned and operated The Little Review Gallery, which featured primarily European modernists.

Between 1925 and 1929, Heap, as the new editor, made The Little Review “the American mouthpiece for all the new systems of art that the modern world had produced.” Under Heap's editorship, the magazine published more art in addition to literature and organized two expositions in conjunction with the magazine. The expositions were titled The Machine-Age Exposition and The International Theatre Exposition. In May 1929, the final issue of The Little Review appeared as a series of letters and questionnaires from past contributors. Anderson reflects in her autobiography, My Thirty Years’ War, after creating the magazine as place to record her own thoughts “I decided that there had been enough of this. Everyone was doing it—the artist above all”.

== Content and noteworthy issues ==
Though the April 1920 issue instigated the famous obscenity trial of Ulysses, several other issues gained the magazine notoriety.

True to its four pronged goal to publish "Literature, Drama, Music, Art", The Little Review began as a journal of criticism but also published original poetry and fiction. During the first few years, the magazine published pieces that championed anarchy as well as Ezra Pound's experimental poetry called Imagism. Topics covered in the first issue (March 1914) included feminist book reviews, an essay about Nietzsche, and literary pieces written by Floyd Dell, Rupert Brooke, and Alice Meynell. The pieces Margaret Anderson selected for this first issue established the magazine's concern with feminism, art, conversation, and criticism that it pursued throughout its run.

=== May 1914 issue (Emma Goldman Scandal) ===
As evidenced in the May 1914 issue, Anderson's anarchistic sympathies became more apparent just a few months after she began the Little Review. The May 1914 issue sparked conversation and controversy about the magazine since it was there that Anderson published her essay titled “The Challenge of Emma Goldman” in which she lauds the notable anarchist for her support of the elimination of private property and religion. The publication of this issue caused such a stir that several of the magazine's existing financial backers withdrew funding, leaving the magazine in dire straits.

=== Blank pages issue (September 1916) ===
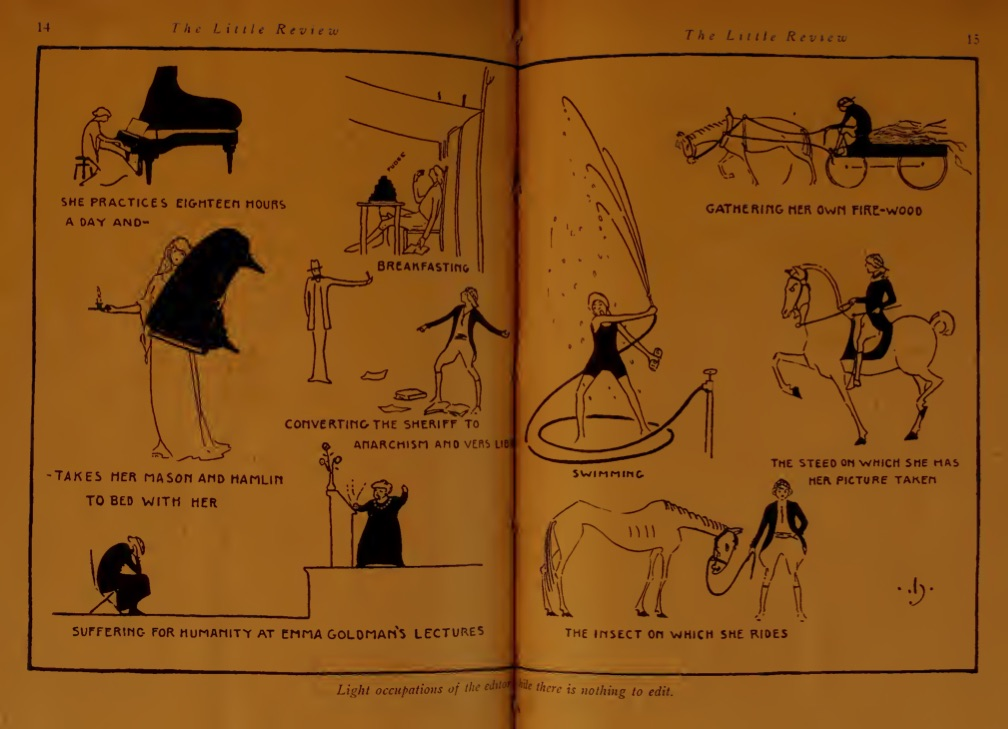
The daily activities of the editor

One of a handful of issues published during the magazine's tenure in California, the September 1916 Little Review, featured several blank pages (pages 1–13 in the issue). Anderson defended this move by claiming that contributors did not submit enough good work, so, as she notes on page one, “The September issue is offered as a Want Ad.” In the pages following the blank ones, Anderson published essays that were characteristic of the magazine's interest: two pieces about the San Francisco Bomb Case in which Thomas Mooney and Warren Billings were accused and convicted (though later pardoned) of detonating a bomb during the July 22 parade held in honor of the U.S.’s entry into World War I and a book review of Frank Harris’s Oscar Wilde: His Life and Confessions. The blank pages issue infuriated some subscribers while it amused others. In particular, some readers were not amused by cartoons illustrating the daily activities of the editor. The cartoons picture the editor riding her horse, playing piano, and attending Emma Goldman lectures, among other activities.

=== Exiles’ number (Spring 1923) ===
The Spring 1923 “Exiles” issue is noteworthy because it published works by American expatriates living in Paris as well as the Parisian avant-garde including Ernest Hemingway, Gertrude Stein, George Antheil, E. E. Cummings, Fernand Léger, and H.D. (Hilda Doolittle). Perhaps the most important contribution of this issue was its publication of six vignettes from Hemingway's debut novel in our time. Beyond Hemingway's work, the issue is noteworthy due to its inclusion of avant-garde French artists such as Fernand Léger and Jean Cocteau as well its experimental front cover that reflected the tastes of editor Jane Heap.

=== Final issue ===
The 1929 issue of The Little Review ended the magazine's run with “Confessions and Letters” from over fifty individuals in the arts, including James Joyce, Wyndham Lewis, and Ezra Pound. The questionnaire, primarily designed by Jane Heap, perturbed many of the artists, and they often responded with comments that they found the questions mundane and uninteresting. Emma Goldman, for example, justified her delayed response by complaining that the questions themselves bored her. She writes, “I have not written sooner because I find the questions really terribly uninteresting,” and continues that “since the questions are so ordinary the replies can be naught else.” Even Anderson and Heap agreed that the questions were unproductive: Anderson ended the magazine's run with an editorial in the 1929 issue in which she stated in reference to the questionnaire that “even the artist doesn't know what he’s talking about.”

== Selected contributors ==
=== In literature ===
Sherwood Anderson
Hart Crane
H.D.
Floyd Dell
T.S. Eliot
Ford Madox Ford
Emma Goldman
James Joyce
Amy Lowell
Mina Loy
Gertrude Stein
Sara Teasdale (under the pseudonym "Frances Trevor")
Elsa von Freytag-Loringhoven
William Carlos Williams

=== In art ===
Hans Arp
Lawrence Atkinson
Jean de Bosschere
Marcel Duchamp
Max Ernst
Fernand Léger
Francis Picabia
Pablo Picasso
Joseph Stella

In the Dec. 1919 issue, the individual identified as serving in the capacity of "Advisory Board" and who provided some content for the magazine was signed simply as "jh".

== In media ==
The magazine was the subject of an Academy Award for Documentary Short Subject nominated documentary, titled, Beyond Imagining: Margaret Anderson and the "Little Review" (1991), by Wendy L. Weinberg.

Celebrating the life and work of Margaret Anderson and the Little Review's remarkable influence, an exhibition “Making No Compromise: Margaret Anderson and the Little Review” was opened at the Beinecke Library, Yale University, in October 2006 for three months.

== Brief bibliography ==
- Gammel, Irene. “The Little Review and Its Dada Fuse, 1918 to 1921.” Elsa: Gender, Dada, and Everyday Modernity. A Cultural Biography. Cambridge, Massachusetts: MIT Press, 2002. Pg. 238-261.
- Hoffman, Frederick J., Charles Allen, Carolyn F. Ulrich. (1946). “The Little Review.” The Little Magazine: A History and a Bibliography. Princeton: Princeton UP. pg. 52-66.
- Morrisson, Mark. (2001). “Youth in Public: The Little Review and Commercial Culture in Chicago.” The Public Face of Modernism: Little Magazine's, Audiences, and Reception, 1905-1920. Madison: U of Wisconsin P. pg. 133-66.
- Tashjian, Dickran. (1998). “From Anarchy to Group Force: The Social Text of The Little Review.” Women in Dada: Essays on Sex, Gender and Identity. Ed. Naomi Sawelson-Gorse. Cambridge: MIT P. pg. 262-91
