= Thomas Seltzer (translator) =

Russian-American translator (1875–1943)

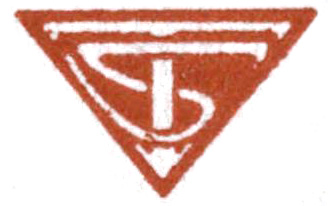
Logo of Thomas Seltzer's publishing company from D.H. Lawrence's Tortoises

Thomas Seltzer (22 February 1875, Poltava − 11 September 1943, New York City) was a Russian-American translator, editor and book publisher.

== Life ==
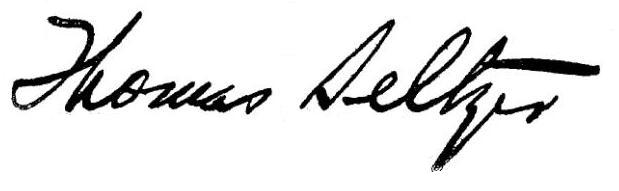
Signature of Thomas Seltzer

Born in the Russian Empire, Thomas Seltzer moved to the United States with his family as a young child. He attended the University of Pennsylvania on scholarship and graduated in 1897, going on to do post-graduate work at Columbia University. In addition to speaking his native Russian, Seltzer was conversant in Polish, Italian, German, Yiddish, and French and it was his language skills that led him to a career as a translator. He parleyed his way with words into work as a journalist and editor, writing for newspapers and magazines, notably Harper's Weekly and in 1911–1918, Seltzer worked with Max Eastman, Charles Erskine Scott Wood, and others as editor of the socialist magazine, The Masses.

As an editor, Seltzer gained experience at Funk & Wagnalls and beginning in 1917 the New York publishing firm Boni & Liveright. It was during his tenure with Funk & Wagnalls that Seltzer met his wife Adele Szold and the couple were married 21 October 1906.

In 1919 Seltzer established his own publishing venture, Thomas Seltzer, Inc., and is credited with bringing D. H. Lawrence's works to the American public. His work also brought him into contact with such authors as Henry James and Theodore Dreiser.

As a result of publishing controversial writers, Seltzer was attacked by the New York Society for the Suppression of Vice in 1922 and all copies of D. H.Lawrence's Women in Love, Arthur Schnitzler's Casanova's Homecoming, and the anonymously written A Young Girl's Diary were confiscated. Seltzer refused to back down, retaining a lawyer and fighting the attempted censorship in the court case People v. Seltzer. Although victorious, it was not to be the end of Seltzer's fight against censorship, as he was charged with publishing "unclean" books in 1923; once again, D.H. Lawrence's Women in Love was the impetus for the charges. Fighting censorship charges eventually led Seltzer's publishing efforts into bankruptcy. The business was taken over by Seltzer's nephews Charles and Albert Boni.

Seltzer died in New York on 11 September 1943, three years after Adele's death. He had no children.

== Works ==
Works translated by Seltzer

- Andreyev, Leonid. The pretty Sabine women; a play in three acts. [publication information unknown.]
- Dostoevsky, Fyodor. Poor people. [Boni And Liveright, INC. 1917]
- Gorky, Maxim. Mother. [publication information unknown.]
- Korolenko, Vladimir. "The Shades." Current Opinion (November 1907): 577–84.
- Gorky, Maxim. The spy: the story of a superfluous man. New York, B.W. Huebsch, 1908.
- Sudermann, Hermann. The song of songs. New York, Huebsch, 1909.
- Ostwald, Wilhelm. Natural philosophy. New York, H. Holt and company, 1910.
- Hauptmann, Gerhart. The fool in Christ, Emanuel Quint; a novel. London, Methuen & Co, 1911.
- Novikov, IA. A. War and its alleged benefits. New York, H. Holt and company, 1911.
- Hauptmann, Gerhart. Atlantis: a novel. New York, B.W. Huebsch, 1912.
- Andreyev, Leonid. Savva. The life of man: two plays. Boston, Little, Brown, 1914.
- Andreyev, Leonid. Love of one's neighbor. New York, A. and C. Boni, 1914.
- Przybyszewski, Stanislaw. Homo sapiens: a novel in three parts. New York, A.A. Knopf, 1915.
- Artsybashev, M. War; a play in four acts. New York, A.A. Knopf, 1916.
- Gogol, Nikolai. The inspector-general: a comedy in five acts. New York, A.A. Knopf, 1916.
- Haeckel, Ernst. Eternity: world-war thoughts on life and death, religion, and the theory of evolution. New York, The Truth seeker, 1916.
- Savinkov, B. V. What never happened; a novel of the revolution. New York, Knopf, 1917.
- Andreyev, Leonid. The seven that were hanged. New York, Boni and Liveright, 1918.
- Andersen Nexø, Martin. In God's land. New York, P. Smith, 1933.

Works compiled and edited by Seltzer

- Tolstoi: a critical study of him and his works. New York, E.S. Werner Pub. & supply Co., 1901.
- Best Russian short stories. New York, Boni and Liveright, 1917
- Embers of a revolution: stories collected in the decade before the Russian Revolution

Works Published by Thomas Seltzer, Inc.:

- James, Henry. Master Eustace. 1920.
- Lawrence, D. H. Touch and Go. 1920.
- Lawrence, D. H. Women in Love. 1920.
- Anonymous. A Young Girl's Diary. 1921
- Lawrence, D. H. Sea and Sardinia. 1921.
- Lawrence, D. H. Tortoises. 1921.
- Schnitzler, Arthur. Casanova's Homecoming. 1921.
- Lawrence, D. H. England, my England, and other stories. 1922.
- Lawrence, D. H. Fantasia of the unconscious. 1922.
- Lawrence, D. H. Kangaroo. 1923.
- Powys, John Cowper. Samphire. 1922. (poems)
- Cummings, E. E. Tulips and Chimneys. 1923. (poems)
- Lawrence, D. H. Studies in classic American literature. 1923.
- Scott, Evelyn. Escapade. 1923.
- Crane, Nathalia. The janitor's boy, and other poems. 1924.
- Morand, Paul. Green Shoots (Tendres Stocks). 1924.
- Proust, Marcel. Within a budding grove. 1924.
- Ford, Ford Madox. Some do not. 1925.
- Proust, Marcel. The Guermantes way. 1925.
- Scott, Evelyn. The golden door. 1925
