= Hermine Hug-Hellmuth =

Austrian psychoanalyst (1871–1924)

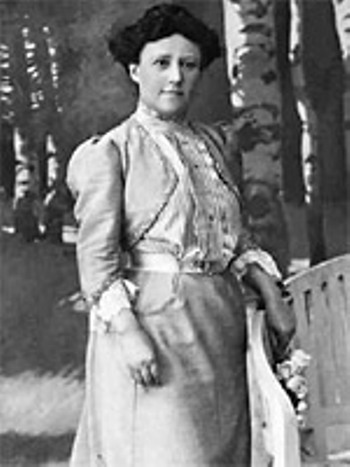
Hermine Hug-Hellmuth

Hermine Hug-Hellmuth (born Hermine Hug Edle von Hugenstein; 31 August 1871, Vienna – 9 September 1924, Vienna) was an Austrian psychoanalyst. She is regarded as the first psychoanalyst practicing with children and the first to conceptualize the technique of psychoanalysing children.

Her book, A Young Girl's Diary (1921), published in New York by Thomas Seltzer, was prefaced with an endorsement from Sigmund Freud dated 27 April 1915. Hug-Hellmuth denied authorship, however, and published the diary under the pseudonym Grete Lainer. In 1923 Hug-Hellmuth ultimately accepted title of editor for the diary in the third German edition. Written from a psychoanalyst perspective, the work which included Freudian theories to explain phenomena. It was praised within the field of psychoanalysis. It is one of the most cited contributions to child psychoanalysis.

She became a member of the Vienna Psychoanalytic Society from 1913 to 1924 but was murdered by her nephew, Rudolf Hug, on 9 September 1924. Rudolf later claimed that his life was ruined due to the psychoanalytical experiments Hug-Hellmuth performed on him.

Her work influenced such notable psychoanalysts as Anna Freud, Melanie Klein, Jean Berges and Gabriel Balbo.

== Early life and education ==
Hug-Hellmuth was born into a Catholic family, the second daughter of Hugo Hug Von Hugenstein, a military officer in the Austrian war ministry. He was father to an illegitimate daughter named Antonia Farmer who later went by the name Antonia Hug.
Her mother, Ludovika Achepohl was a tutor before dying from a pulmonary disease speculated to be tuberculosis.

She first trained to become a teacher before pursuing psychoanalysis. Hug-Hellmuth became a teacher and taught in private and public school for several years before she returned to her studies and enrolled in University of Vienna in 1897. She studied physical sciences and in 1909, received her doctorate in physics.

She quit her teaching job in 1910 and became a patient of Isidor Sadger Viennese Analyst, who influenced her interest in psychoanalysis. Hug-Hellmuth published her first piece on psychoanalysis in the Zentralblatt fur Psyoanalyse in 1911 entitled "The Analysis of a Dream of 5-Year-Old Boy". In 1921, she became the director of the Educational Counselling Centre associated with the Psychoanalytic.

Her name was not recorded much in official documents and was instead mentioned in English schools that were designed to "cure the children" through games. Hug-Hellmuth’s study was about the polyporphically perverse child. She contributed ideas alongside Sigmund Freud in the research of child psychoanalysis. In the English schools, she devised ‘games’ involving drawing and writing. The games were designed to understand the unconscious minds of children. Her intention was to apply the results of the studies in adults when possible.

== Late life and career ==
Later on in her professional career, she did a research project called “From the life of the soul of the child. The time of the game” in 1913. The research project made her a pioneer in the field of psychoanalysis. The project was done to help assess the subconscious of children. Her project first started with observations on the children. The observation gave Hermine Hug-Hellmuth many ideas to work with. She would then mark the behaviors as either “sadism”, “autosadism”, “autoeroticism”, “masochism” or “exhibitionism”.

In 1919, she presented the “psychoanalytic journal of a little girl” anonymously in Vienna. When it was published by Sándor Ferenczi, Lou Andreas-Salomé, and Stefan Zweig it received great success and was praised by Sigmund Freud as “little jewel”. The document was very reminiscent of Freudian theories and others called it “too good to be true” such that several child specialists doubted how authentic it is. An English psychologist Cyril Burt thought that some scenes inside the diary were too long and could’ve taken five hours to write and its complexity and literary qualities would not be consistent with a child who supposedly wrote the diary. In response to the accusations, Hermine Hug-Hellmuth republished it under Burt’s name and claimed that it is indeed written by a female teenager aged 11 to 14. Some doubts about its authenticity remained nevertheless even after her death.

She later on shifted her perspective on the mater from “perverse polymorphic” child thesis which involved many sexual interpretations to that of child criminal or “psychopath” studies.

One of her projects before her death was on her own nephew who was born as an illegitimate child of her half-sister. She took him in under her care after the death of her sister. His name was Rudolf Otto Hug. She analyzed the letter written by her Rudolph in which she concluded that he portrayed a good part of sexual and sadistic curiosity in his act of piercing the wasp nest as he described in his letter. She emphasized criminal intent in most of her later studies. She believed that he would either become a powerful "genie" or a "murderer".

Her work on the "diary" that she accomplished in her early psychoanalytic career was removed from sale by Sigmund Freud in 1927 following her death.

=== Death ===
In 1906, Hermine Hug-Hellmuth’s half-sister Antonie Hug had an illegitimate child named Rudolf Otto Hug, known to friends and family as Rolf. Many of Hug-Hellmuth’s papers included observations of Rolf, such as his early development, behavior, and dreams. He became an important research subject for Hug-Hellmuth, emerging as the major personality in her first book, Aus Dem Seelenleben des Kindes (On the Spiritual and Mental Life of the Child), published in 1913. She concluded in the book that Rolf’s actions were based on abnormal sexual motives and tendencies. Antonie Hug died on February 2, 1915, because of tuberculosis, leaving nine-year-old Rolf an orphan. She did not want Hug-Hellmuth to be Rolf’s guardian, therefore, he was taken care of other people, although he did live with Hug-Hellmuth for some time. Rolf was extremely angry with his aunt for many reasons, including his belief that Hug-Hellmuth never saw him as more than a guinea pig. He became a delinquent and at the age of sixteen, attempted suicide. He was placed in an institution of adolescent delinquents in 1922 which he later got expelled in 1924. He started demanding more money from Hug-Hellmuth. On September 9, 1924, Hug-Hellmuth was found dead in her apartment. She was strangled by her nephew Rolf while he was trying to steal money from her. He got convicted of murder and was sentenced to prison for 12 years, though he later granted parole in September 1930. He immediately demanded money from Vienna Psychoanalytic Society through Paul Federn, who was a leading psychoanalyst and a close collaborator of Sigmund Freud, to compensate for the fact that his life was ruined because of his aunt’s psychoanalytic experiments that were done on him.

=== Implications of her final will and testament ===
In a will written a few days before her death, Hug-Hellmuth requested that no accounting of her life or work be published, even in academic publications on the psychoanalytic field. This request is often cited as a reason for the lack of credit Hug-Hellmuth receives for her contributions in child psychoanalysis and lack of acknowledgement on the influence her work had on other contributors to the field.

== Contributions to psychoanalysis ==
=== The Vienna Psychoanalytic Society ===
The Vienna Psychoanalytic Society was initially named the Wednesday Evening Psychological Meetings before being re-branded in 1906, was started by Sigmund Freud in 1902 as a small informal gathering of minds in his practices’ waiting room. Hermine Hug-Hellmuth was first recorded attending the Vienna Psychoanalytic Society on October 8, 1913 and remained an attendee until her death in 1924.

A few weeks after her induction, on October 29, 1913, Hug-Hellmuth gave her first presentation to the group. Introducing two essays by Stanley Hall and His School, one on “rage” and the second on “dolls”, Hug-Hellmuth gives commentary on the papers from the viewpoint of psychoanalysis. While both essays held a focus on children, the writing on “dolls” held a great interest to Hug-Hellmuth concerning her studies on what play reveals about the psyche of a child. In the record of the group discussion following her presentation, members criticised the papers and Hall. Claiming fault in his methods of group study over analysis, and the belief that he was confusing concepts of the study and focusing on irrelevant information to conclude. Members rejected the more novel ideas about play and attachment, and how they relate to the child psyche. There is no recorded response from Hug-Hellmuth on the discussion held by the members after her presentation of the material.

=== Relationships with other psychoanalysts ===
==== Sigmund Freud ====
To her further contribution on child psychoanalysis, Hug-Hellmuth anonymously published A Young Girl’s Diary in 1921 which contained a Letter by Sigmund Freud written in 1915 that served as a preface to the book:

In a letter written in 1915 and later published as a preface to the book, Sigmund Freud expressed strong support for the publication of A Young Girl’s Diary, describing it as an unusually detailed and informative account of adolescent psychological development.

Written from a Freudian theoretical perspective, the book supposedly contained the nature of the viewpoint of an adolescent girl whom Hug-Hellmuth at the time was treating. Although the book caused a scandal as many people thought to be its contents as fabricated, A Young Girl’s Diary was generally acknowledged as an interesting prospect of developing sexuality within a youthful adolescent. Freud defended Hug-Hellmuth’s work as legitimate which however was ultimately withdrawn in the German circulation due to its fraudulent speculations.

==== Anna Freud ====
Hug-Hellmuth’s psychoanalytical work had great influences on future psychoanalysts such as Anna Freud. Hug-Hellmuth started publishing her works in 1912, while Freud started publishing her first important works by 1927. Although the contribution by Hug-Hellmuth is evident in her work, Freud provided seldom acknowledgment towards her input in the field of psychoanalysis, and had failed to credit Hug-Hellmuth in her book Introduction to the Technique of Child Analysis, 1927 although there were many similar structural elements to Hug-Hellmuth’s paper On the Technique of Child-Analysis, 1920. Ultimately, Hug-Hellmuth’s viewpoint regarding education and child-raising had given weight to Anna Freud’s work in respect to her contributions on the ego, defence mechanisms, and prescriptive developmental lines, despite the unacknowledgement of Hug-Hellmuth as her predecessor.

==== Melanie Klein ====
Klein was also influenced by Hug-Hellmuth’s contribution to the field regarding child psychoanalysis. Like Anna Freud, Klein started publishing her first important works in 1927, while also unacknowledging Hug-Hellmuth’s input in the field. An appendix to Klein’s work The Psycho-Analysis of Children by ‘The Melanie Klein Trust’ elaborated the introduction of the Psychoanalytic Play Technique by Klein herself in Berlin, and proposed that Hug-Hellmuth and Anna Freud had taken a different direction than her in the field of child psychoanalysis. One of the only times Klein acknowledged Hug-Hellmuth was to criticize her technique on child play experimentation as it lacked fixed-rules within the session - a concept that Hug-Hellmuth believed to be beneficial. Essentially, it can be seen in Melanie Klein’s work regarding her contributions to child’s transference and play technique that there is a depiction of impactful evidence by Hug-Hellmuth’s significance in the psychoanalytical stream.

==== Jean Bergès and Gabriel Balbo ====
Other Psychoanalysts have seen to have an impact by the contributions to the field of child psychoanalysis by Hug-Hellmuth. French Analysts Jean Bergès and Gabriel Balbo have highlighted her works regarding the participation of parents and transference in their book Psychoanalysis and the Child. Bergè and Balbo had recognized Hug-Hellmuth’s approach to this concept as her own and ultimately added on to the theory in fine detail.

== Diary scandal ==
=== A Young Girl's Diary ===
Hermine Hug-Helmuth published A Young Girl’s Diary in 1919 under the pseudonym Grete Lainer. This book is one of her most famous publications despite her profuse denial of authorship. Her name was not credited in any way until the third German edition in 1923 where she accepted the title of editor. The book was prefaced by a letter from Sigmund Freud to Hug-Hellmuth which was dated April 27, 1915. In the preface, Freud expressed his admiration for her piece of work, calling it a “gem” that must be published.

The diary was an account of a young girl’s experiences as she matured from age 11 to 14. Hellmuth claimed the diaries were written by a girl named Vera under the pseudonym Grete Lainer, and were intended for Grete’s best friend Hella. The book provided a detailed description of her relationships and maturing sexuality. It included the arguments she had with her older sister and the emotions she endured during her mother’s passing. Grete also explored her sexual curiosity when pulled over by a handsome police officer yet acknowledged the fear she had for intercourse.

=== Response ===
A Young Girl’s Diary was initially praised for its insight since it was uncommon for a book to provide detailed descriptions of an adolescent's life development through maturity. Hellmuth’s book became a scandal after many accusations that the diaries were fraudulent. A persistent doubter of Hellmuth’s work was Charlotte Buhler, a Professor of Child Psychology in Vienna who also found interest in children’s diaries. She strongly opposed psychoanalysis and criticized the book for its clear psychoanalytic perspective that propagated Freud’s ideas on sexuality in infants. Charlotte’s students persisted even after Hug-Hellmuth’s death in trying to prove that A Young Girl’s Diary was written by an adult.

Despite the heavily debated controversy, she sold 10, 000 copies and produced 2 English editions, 3 French editions, and 3 German editions. Her book is one of the most cited contributions to child psychoanalysis. Hug-Hellmuth’s book is regarded within the field of psychoanalysis and was well received by the Psycho-Analytic Society of London. Sigmund Freud also supported and defended her work as legitimate, but it was not sufficient to prevent the German edition from being withdrawn. Throughout her whole life, Hug-Hellmuth never admitted to writing A Young Girl’s Diary.

== Publications ==
- 1912 The Analysis of a Dream of a 51/2-Year-Old Boy
- 1912 Contributions to the Subject "Lapses in Writing and Reading"
- 1912 "A Lapse of Speech" in a Small Schoolboy
- 1912 The True Nature of the Child's Psyche: The Child's Concept of Death
- 1912 On Hearing Colours: An Attempt to Clarify the Phenomenon on the Basis of Psychoanalytical Methods
- 1913 On Female Masturbation
- 1913 The Mental Life of the Child: A Psychoanalytic Study
- 1913 On the True Nature of the Child's Psyche: On the First Memories of Childhood
- 1913 Claire Henrika Weber: "Liddy"
- 1913 Mother Love
- 1913 On the True Nature of the Child's Psyche
- 1913 Children's Dreams
- 1913 A Female Counterpart to Rank's "A Contribution to Infantile Sexuality"
- 1913 Child Misdemeanours and Naughtiness
- 1914 On the True Nature of the Child's Psyche: God and Father
- 1914 On the True Nature of the Child's Psyche: Children's Letters
- 1914 Child Psychology, Pedagogy
- 1915 A Dream About Oneself
- 1915 War Neurosis in Children
- 1915 War Neurosis in Women
- 1915 Some Relations Between Eroticism and Mathematics
- 1915 A Case of Female Foot Fetishism, or Rather, Shoe Fetishism
- 1917 On the True Nature of the Child's Psyche: On Early Learning and Maturity
- 1917 Mother-Son, Father-Daughter
- 1919 A Young Girl's Diary
- 1920 On the Technique of the Analysis of Children
- 1920 Child Psychology and Education
- 1920 The Technique of Child Analysis
- 1921 On the True Nature of the Child's Psyche: The "Middle" Child
- 1921 Psychoanalytical Findings About Women
- 1921 Correspondence between reviewer of his book (A Young Girl's Diary) and H. Hug-Hellmuth
- 1923 The Importance of the Family for the Fate of the Individual
- 1924 The Libidinal Structure of the Family
- 1924 Child Psychology and Pedagogy
- 1924 New Paths to the Understanding of Youth. Psychoanalytical Lectures for Parents, Teachers, Educators, Kindergarten Teachers and Social Workers
