= Edward de Grazia =

American dramatist

Edward Richard de Grazia (February 5, 1927 – April 11, 2013) was an American lawyer, writer, and free speech activist.

De Grazia was born in Chicago. He served in the U.S. Army during World War II, before returning to the United States. He graduated from the University of Chicago with a Bachelor's in 1948, and earned his J.D. degree from the University of Chicago Law School in 1951. He practiced law in Washington, D.C., and then worked for a time with UNESCO in Paris (1956 to 1959). After teaching at a variety of Washington, D.C., area law schools, in 1976 he became a founding member of the faculty at Benjamin Cardozo School of Law, where he remained for the next three decades.

De Grazia was married three times, to Ellen O'Connor, Liz Goode, and Lora Price. He had several children, including Augustus de Grazia (died 2011), David de Grazia, Christophe de Grazia, Belinda de Grazia Holtzclaw, and Elizabeth de Grazia Blumenfeld.

De Grazia was involved in numerous high-profile cases of literary and artistic censorship in the 1960s, including several on behalf of the publisher Barney Rosset, who published works by Henry Miller and William Burroughs, among others. De Grazia was also involved in efforts to protect the speech rights of antiwar demonstrators, as described by Norman Mailer in Armies of the Night (1968). In 1991 he published Girls Lean Back Everywhere: The Law of Obscenity and the Assault on Genius, a lengthy and authoritative history of the struggle against literary censorship.

== Significant cases litigated ==
- Postal Service censorship of Lysistrata (1955)
- Grove Press v. Gerstein (1964), censorship of Henry Miller's Tropic of Cancer (1934), decided with Jacobellis v. Ohio
- 1965 - censorship of William S. Burroughs' Naked Lunch (1959)
- 1967 censorship of film I Am Curious (Yellow) (1967)
- Defense of Lenny Bruce

== Bibliography ==
- Censorship Landmarks (1969)
- Banned Films (with Roger Newman) (1982)
- Girls Lean Back Everywhere: The Law of Obscenity and the Assault on Genius (1991)
