= Margaret C. Anderson =

American magazine editor (1886–1973)

Margaret Caroline Anderson
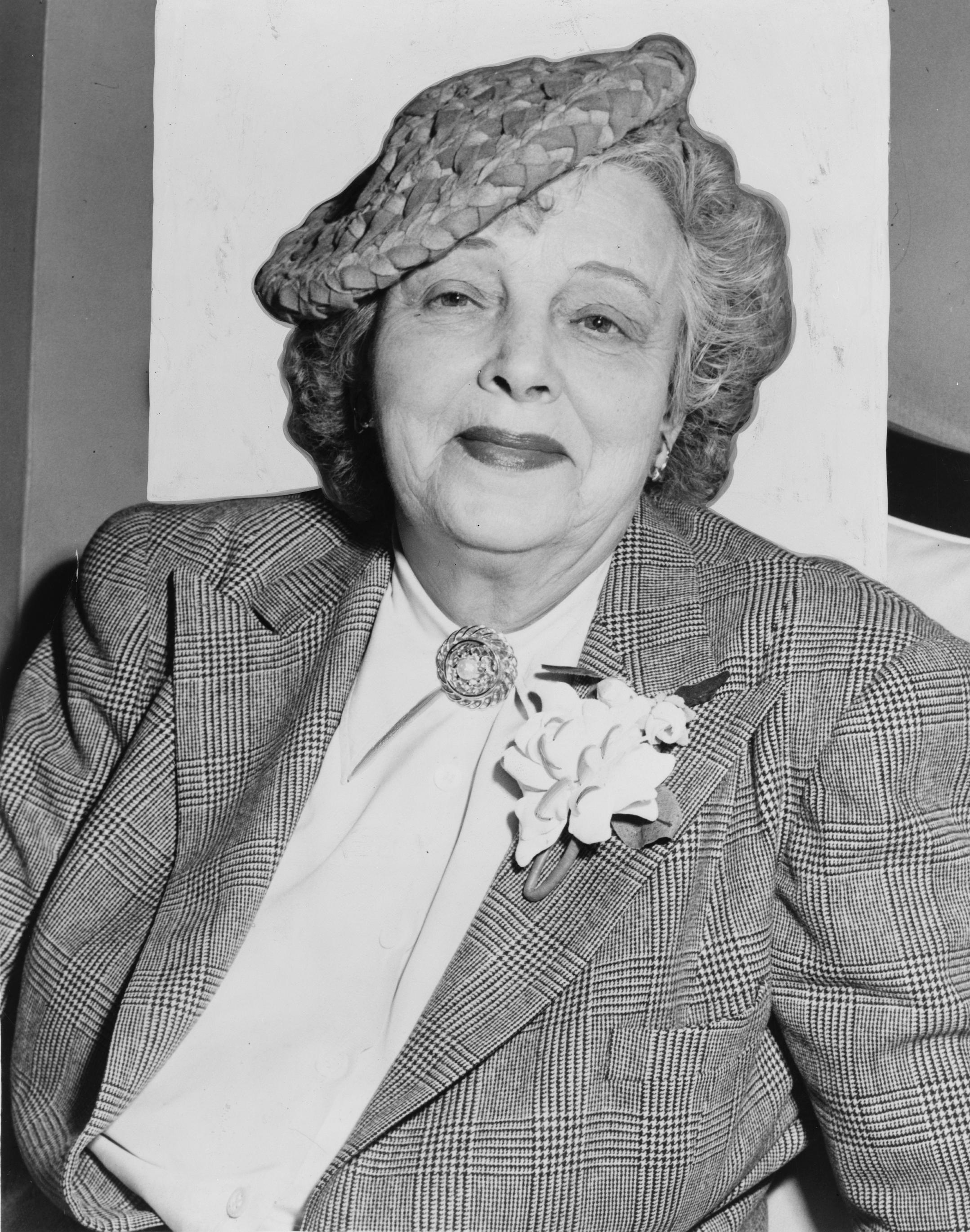
- Anderson in 1951
- Born: November 24, 1886; Indianapolis, Indiana, United States
- Died: October 19, 1973 (aged 86); Le Cannet, France
- Occupations: editor, author
- Partner: Dorothy Caruso (1942–1955)
- Writing career
- Period: 1908–1973
- Genre: memoir
- Subjects: Esotericism, Fourth Way
- Notable work: The Unknowable Gurdjieff (1962)
- Movement: New Thought
- Website: www.littlereview.com/mca/mca.htm

Margaret Caroline Anderson (November 24, 1886 – October 19, 1973) was the American founder, editor and publisher of the art and literary magazine The Little Review, which published a collection of modern American, English and Irish writers between 1914 and 1929. The periodical is most noted for introducing many prominent American and British writers of the 20th century, such as Ezra Pound and T. S. Eliot, in the United States and publishing the first thirteen chapters of James Joyce's then-unpublished novel Ulysses.

A large collection of Anderson's papers on Gurdjieff's teaching is preserved at the Beinecke Rare Book and Manuscript Library, Yale University.

== Life and career ==
Anderson was born in Indianapolis, Indiana, in November 1886, the eldest of three daughters of Arthur Aubrey Anderson and Jessie (Shortridge) Anderson. She graduated from high school in Anderson, Indiana, in 1903 and then entered a two-year junior preparatory class at Western College for Women in Oxford, Ohio.

In 1906, she left college at the end of her freshman year to pursue a career as a pianist. In the fall of 1908, she left home for Chicago, where she reviewed books for a religious weekly (The Continent) before joining The Dial. By 1913, she was a book critic for the Chicago Evening Post.

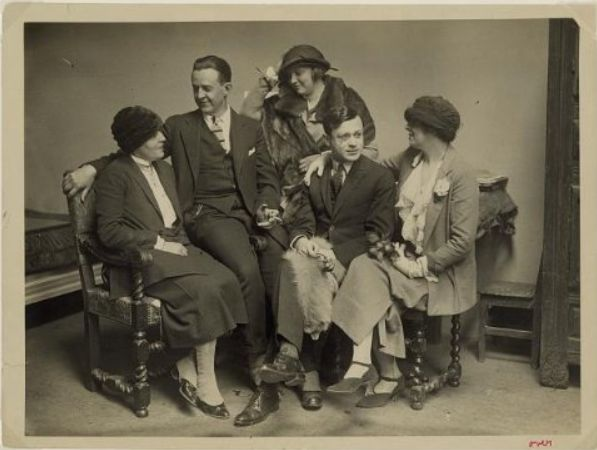
Janet Flanner-Solita Solano Collection/LOC ppmsca.13300. Jane Heap, John Rodker, Martha Dennison, Tristan Tzara, Margaret Anderson, ca. 1920s

In March 1914, Anderson founded the avant-garde literary magazine The Little Review during Chicago's literary renaissance. "An organ of two interests, art and good talk about art", the monthly's first issue featured articles on Nietzsche, feminism and psychoanalysis.

Early funding was intermittent, and for six months in 1914 she was forced out of her Lake Bluff residence at 837 West Ainslie Street in Chicago, as well as the magazine's offices at 410 S. Michigan Avenue in Chicago's historic Fine Arts Building. During this period, she camped with Harriet Dean, family members, and staff members on a Lake Michigan beach.

The writer Ben Hecht described her this way:

During the years I knew her she wore the same suit, a tailored affair in robin's egg blue. Despite this unvarying costume she was as chic as any of the girls who model today for the fashion magazines. ... It was surprising to see a coiffure so neat on a noggin so stormy.

In 1916, Anderson met Jane Heap, a spirited intellectual and artist immersed in Chicago's Arts and Crafts Movement and a former lover of the novelist Djuna Barnes. The two became lovers, and Anderson convinced Heap to become co-editor of The Little Review. Heap maintained a low profile, signing her contributions simply "JH", but she had a major impact on the success of the journal through its bold and radical content.

For a while, Anderson and Heap published the magazine out of a ranch in Muir Woods, in the San Francisco Bay Area.

In 1917, Anderson and Heap moved to New York's Greenwich Village. With the help of the poet and critic Ezra Pound, who acted as Anderson's foreign editor in London, The Little Review published some of the most influential new writers in the English language, including Hart Crane, T. S. Eliot, Ernest Hemingway, James Joyce, Pound himself, and William Butler Yeats. The magazine's most published poet was the New York dadaist Baroness Elsa von Freytag-Loringhoven, with whom Heap became friends on the basis of their shared confrontational feminist and artistic agendas. Other notable contributors included Sherwood Anderson, André Breton, Jean Cocteau, Malcolm Cowley, Marcel Duchamp, Ford Madox Ford, Emma Goldman, Vachel Lindsay, Amy Lowell, Francis Picabia, Carl Sandburg, Gertrude Stein, Wallace Stevens, Arthur Waley, and William Carlos Williams. Even so, however, Anderson once published an issue with a dozen blank pages to protest the temporary lack of exciting new works.

In 1918, starting with the March issue, The Little Review began serializing James Joyce's Ulysses. Over time the U.S. Post Office seized and burned four issues of the magazine, and Anderson and Heap were convicted of obscenity charges. Although the obscenity trial was ostensibly about Ulysses, Irene Gammel argues that The Little Review came under attack for its overall subversive tone and, in particular, its publication of Elsa von Freytag-Loringhoven's sexually explicit poetry and outspoken defense of Joyce. During the trial in February 1921, hundreds of Greenwich Villagers, men and women, marched into Special Court Sessions; the outcome was that Anderson and Heap were fined $100 each and fingerprinted.

In early 1924, through Alfred Richard Orage, Anderson learned of the spiritual teacher George Ivanovitch Gurdjieff, and she saw performances of his "sacred dances", first at the Neighbourhood Playhouse and later at Carnegie Hall. Shortly after Gurdjieff's automobile accident, Anderson, along with Georgette Leblanc, Jane Heap and Monique Surrere, moved to France to visit him at Fountainebleau-Avon, where he had set up his institute at Château du Prieuré in Avon.

Anderson and Heap adopted the two sons of Anderson's ailing sister, Lois. They brought Lois and her sons, Tom and Arthur "Fritz" Peters, to Prieuré in June 1924. After they returned to New York in 1925, the two boys were taken in by Alice B. Toklas and Gertrude Stein.

In 1929, Solita Solano had an affair with Anderson, who had come to Paris with her lover, the French singer Georgette Leblanc. The affair lasted several years, though Anderson remained living with Leblanc.

In 1929, Anderson and Heap separated. That year, Heap put out the final issue of The Little Review, edited at Hotel St. Germain-Des-Pres, 36 rue Bonaparte, Paris. Afterward, Heap moved to England.

In 1935, Jane Heap moved to London, where Heap led Gurdjieff study groups until her death in 1964.

Anderson got to know Elizabeth Jenks Clark through Solita Solano after Clark returned to the US. Clark and Solano became Anderson's closest friends, although Anderson had in the meantime fallen in love with Dorothy Caruso, widow of the singer Enrico Caruso.

Later, Anderson moved to Le Cannet on the French Riviera (Cannes), to live in "le phare de Tancarville", a lighthouse. She lived there for many years with Georgette Leblanc, her sister Lois and Lois's daughter Linda Card.

The teachings of George Ivanovitch Gurdjieff played an important role in Anderson's life. Anderson met Gurdjieff in Paris and, together with Leblanc, began studies with him, focusing on his original teaching called The Fourth Way. From 1935 to 1939, Anderson and Leblanc studied with Gurdjieff as part of a group of women known as "The Rope", which included eight members in all. Besides Anderson and Leblanc, these were Jane Heap, Elizabeth Gordon, Solita Solano, Kathryn Hulme, Louise Davidson and Alice Rohrer. Along with Katherine Mansfield and Jane Heap, she remains one of the most noted disciples at Gurdjieff's Institute for the Harmonious Development of Man, at Fontainebleau, near Paris, from October 1922 to 1924.

Anderson studied with Gurdjieff in France until his death in October 1949, writing about him and his teachings in most of her books, most extensively in her memoir, The Unknowable Gurdjieff.

In 1942, evacuating from the war in France, Anderson sailed for the United States. With her passage paid by Ernest Hemingway, Anderson met on the voyage Dorothy Caruso, widow of the famous tenor Enrico Caruso. The two began a romantic relationship, became lovers, and lived together, in New York, until Dorothy's death in 1955.

In 1955, Anderson returned to Le Cannet, and there she died of emphysema on October 19, 1973. She is buried beside Georgette Leblanc in the Notre Dame des Anges Cemetery.

== Commemoration ==
Anderson was the subject of an Academy Award–nominated documentary entitled Beyond Imagining: Margaret Anderson and the "Little Review" in 1991, by Wendy L. Weinberg.

An exhibition, "Making No Compromise: Margaret Anderson and the Little Review", celebrated the life and work of Margaret Anderson and the Little Review's remarkable influence. It opened at the Beinecke Library, Yale University, in October 2006, and ran for three months.

In 2006, Anderson and Jane Heap were inducted into the Chicago Gay and Lesbian Hall of Fame.

In 2014, Anderson was inducted into the Chicago Literary Hall of Fame.

== Selected works ==
Anderson published a three-volume autobiography, consisting of My Thirty Years' War (1930), along with The Fiery Fountains, and The Strange Necessity, written in her last years in Le Cannet. There she also wrote her final book, the novel and memoir, Forbidden Fires.

- 1930: My Thirty Years' War: An Autobiography (PDF). Alfred A. Knopf. 1930. ISBN 0-8180-0210-7. Archived from the original (PDF) on 2023-09-05..
- 1951: The Fiery Fountains: The Autobiography: Continuation and Crisis to 1950, ISBN 0-8180-0211-5.
- 1953: The Little Review Anthology, Hermitage House, 1953.
- 1959: Margaret C. Anderson Correspondence with Ben and Rose Caylor Hecht.
- 1962: The Strange Necessity: The Autobiography, ISBN 0-8180-0212-3.
- 1962: The Unknowable Gurdjieff, memoir, dedicated to Jane Heap. 1962, Arkana. ISBN 0-14-019139-9.
- 1996: Forbidden Fires, part memoir, part novel, Ed. by Mathilda M. Hills. ISBN 1-56280-123-6.

== Bibliography ==
- Ford, Hugh D. (1987). Four Lives in Paris: George Antheil – Kay Boyle – Harold Stearns – Margaret Anderson. North Point Press. ISBN 978-0-86547-250-1.
- Pound/the Little Review: The Letters of Ezra Pound to Margaret Anderson : the Little Review Correspondence, By Ezra Pound, Thomas L. Scott, Melvin J. Friedman, Jackson R. Bryer. Published by New Directions, 1988. ISBN 0-8112-1059-6.
- Morató, Yolanda (2013). Ezra Pound and Antheil: Modernist Music and Avant-garde Identity in England (PDF). Archived from the original (PDF) on 2015-09-06.
- Templeton, Erin E. (2006). McParland, Robert (ed.). "'Dear EzzROAR, 'Dear Anthill' – Ezra Pound, George Antheil and the Complications of Patronage" (PDF). Music and Literary Modernism — Critical Essays and Comparative Studies. New York: Cambridge Scholars Press: 66–86. Archived from the original (PDF) on 2020-09-18.
- Ladies of the Rope: Gurdjieff's Special Left Bank Women's Group, by William Patrick Patterson. Arete Pubns, 1998 . ISBN 1-879514-41-9.
- Baggett, Holly A. (ed.) (2000), Dear Tiny Heart: The Letters of Jane Heap and Florence Reynolds, New York University Press
- Feldman, Paula R. (1980). "Margaret Anderson". American Writers in Paris, 1920-1939. Dictionary of Literary Biography. Vol. 4. Detroit, Mich.: Gale Research Co.
- America—Meet Modernism! Women of the Little Magazine Movement, by Barbara Probst Solomon, Sarah. Great Marsh Press, 2003. ISBN 1-928863-10-8.
- González Díaz, Isabel; Rodríguez González, Dulce María. Home is where the (He) art is: Margaret Anderson and Isadora Duncan, two undomesticated art lovers.
