= John S. Sumner =

Head of the New York Society for the Suppression of Vice

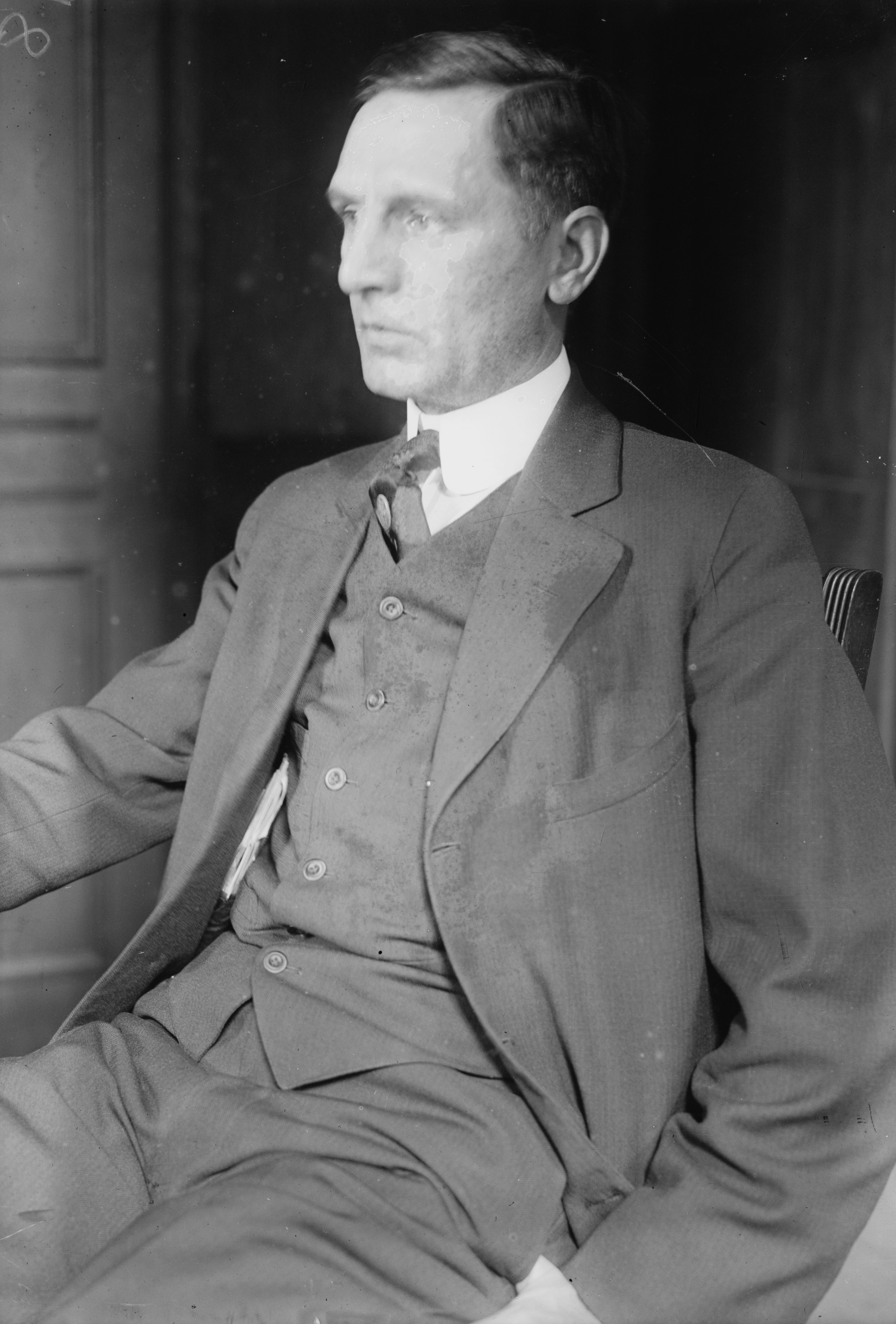
Sumner in 1915

John Saxton Sumner (September 22, 1876 - June 20, 1971) was an American anti-vice activist who headed the New York Society for the Suppression of Vice (NYSSV), a New York state censorship body empowered to recommend obscenity cases to the appropriate prosecutors. He served as Associate Secretary of the NYSSV for three years, succeeding founder Anthony Comstock as Executive Secretary in 1915 upon the latter's death. Sumner retired in 1950; the organization, by then named the Society to Maintain Public Decency, was disbanded shortly thereafter.

== Biography ==
Sumner was born in Washington, D.C., on September 22, 1876, the son of U.S. Navy Rear Admiral George W. Sumner. He was educated in Washington and Brooklyn. He was admitted to the New York State Bar in 1904.

Sumner's actions as NYSSV chief were frequently controversial. He did not win all his cases, and was occasionally hit by countersuits from acquitted publishers. Unapologetic, Sumner was quick to defend the NYSSV and its actions. He arranged for both civil and criminal libel actions to be brought against critics who ridiculed him or the society in print. At times, Sumner veered from his central mission of policing obscenity to attack general values of which he disapproved.

At a National Republican Club luncheon broadcast on national radio, playwright Elmer Rice attacked fellow speaker Sumner, saying, "[Sumner's] job is dependent on his finding vice. If he doesn't find any, his job ceases. Therefore his testimony is no more dependable than that of a prohibition enforcement officer. The obscenity issue is only a smokescreen, hiding an effort to prevent the publication of ideas which are unpleasant to various church groups and to ultra-conservatives."

He died on June 20, 1971.

== See also ==
- New York Society for the Suppression of Vice
