= Anthony Comstock =

American anti-vice activist (1844–1915)

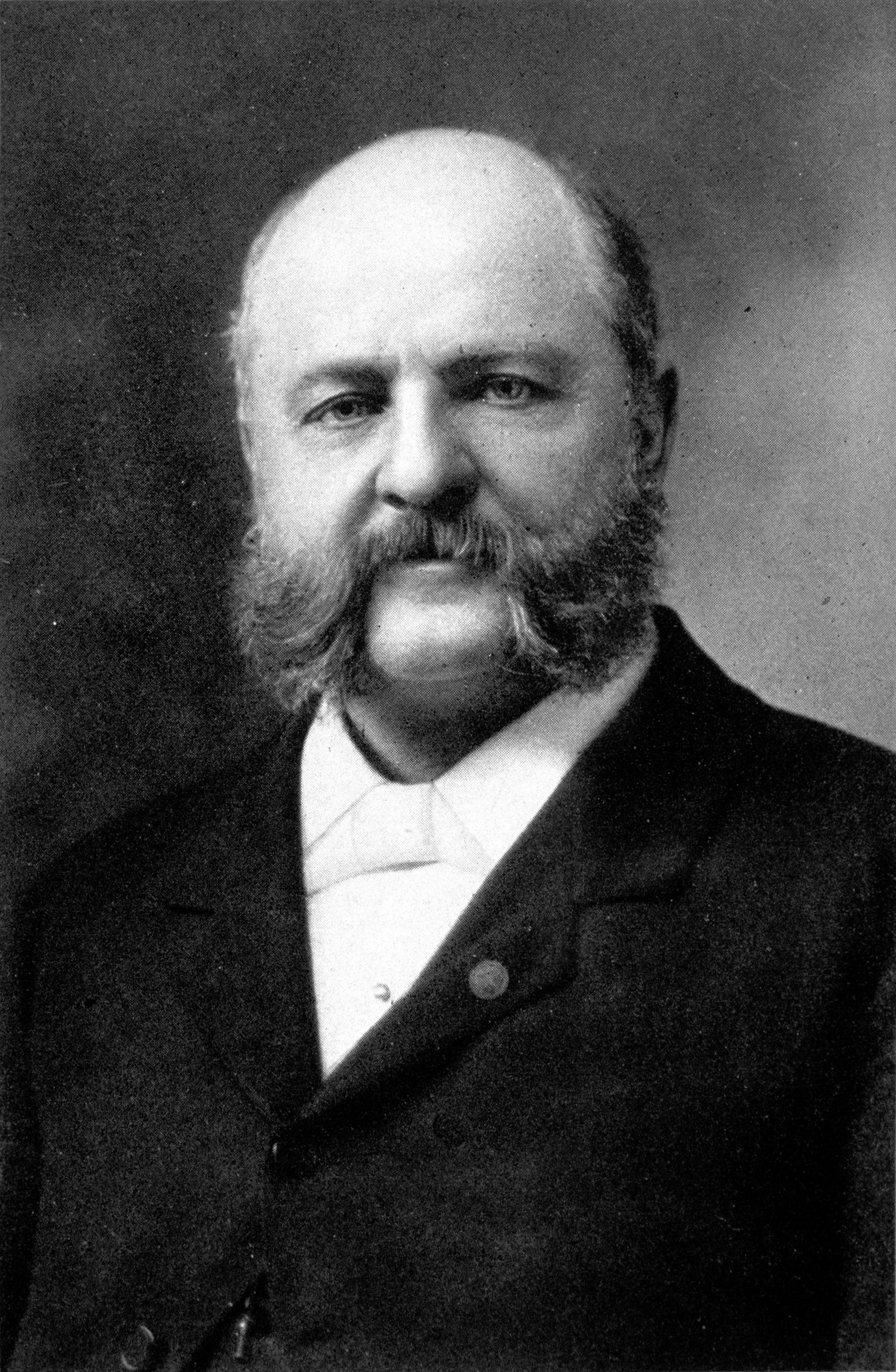
- From Anthony Comstock, Fighter (1913) by Charles Gallaudet Trumbull

Personal details
- Born: March 7, 1844 New Canaan, Connecticut, U.S.
- Died: September 21, 1915 (aged 71) Summit, New Jersey, U.S.
- Party: Republican
- Spouse: Margaret Hamilton
- Children: 2
- Occupation: United States Postal Inspector
- Known for: Creation of the New York Society for the Suppression of Vice; Comstock law

Military service
- Allegiance: United States
- Branch/service: U.S. Army (Union Army)
- Years of service: 1863–1865
- Rank: Private
- Unit: 17th Connecticut Infantry Regiment

Anthony Comstock (/ˈkʌmstɒk, ˈkɒm-/; March 7, 1844 – September 21, 1915) was an American anti-vice activist, United States Postal Inspector, and secretary of the New York Society for the Suppression of Vice (NYSSV), who was dedicated to upholding Christian morality. He opposed obscene literature, abortion, contraception, masturbation, gambling, prostitution, and patent medicine. The terms comstockery and comstockism refer to his extensive censorship campaign of materials that he considered obscene, including birth control advertised or sent by mail. He used his positions in the U.S. Postal Service and the NYSSV (in association with the New York police) to make numerous arrests for obscenity and gambling. Besides these pursuits, he was also involved in efforts to suppress fraudulent banking schemes, mail swindles, and medical quackery.

== Life ==
Coat of Arms of Anthony Comstock

Comstock was born in New Canaan, Connecticut, the son of Polly Ann (née Lockwood) and Thomas Anthony Comstock. As a young man, he enlisted and fought for the Union in the American Civil War from December 1863 to September 1865. He served without incident in Company H, 17th Connecticut Infantry, but he objected to the profanity used by his fellow soldiers.

In 1867, he moved to New York City, where he worked as a porter, a stock clerk, and a wholesale dry goods salesman. He also worked for the Young Men's Christian Association (YMCA) in New York City. On March 5, 1873, he was appointed a special agent of the U.S. Postal Service, a position he held until January 1907.

Comstock was married to Margaret Hamilton; together they had two children, daughter Lillie, who died as an infant, and adopted daughter Adele. He lived in Summit, New Jersey, from 1880 to 1915. In 1892, he built a house at 35 Beekman Road, where he lived for the rest of his life. He died there in 1915.

== Enforcement of Comstock Laws ==
In 1873, Comstock created the New York Society for the Suppression of Vice, an institution dedicated to moral supervision of the American public. Later that year, Comstock successfully influenced the United States Congress to pass the Comstock Laws, which made illegal the delivery by U.S. mail, or by other modes of transportation, of "obscene, lewd, or lascivious" material, as well as prohibiting any methods of production or publication of information pertaining to the procurement of abortion, the prevention of conception and the prevention of venereal disease.

Some of Comstock's ideas of what were "obscene, lewd, or lascivious" could be seen by many modern Westerners as quite broad; during his time of greatest power, some anatomy textbooks were prohibited from being sent to medical students by the United States Postal Service.

1887 letter from Anthony Comstock to Josiah Leeds.

He was a savvy political insider in New York City and was made a special agent of the United States Postal Service with police-level powers, including the right to carry a weapon. With this power, he prosecuted those that he suspected of either public distribution of pornography or commercial fraud.

=== Motivation ===
Motivated by first-hand experience with what he saw as a constant barrage of debauchery among fellow Union soldiers during the Civil War, when he gained power it was not long before Comstock aroused intense loathing from early civil liberties groups and strong support from church-based groups that were worried about public morals.

=== Targets of enforcement ===
==== Publishers of free love advocacy ====
Comstock, the self-styled "weeder in God's garden", arrested D. M. Bennett for publishing "An Open Letter to Jesus Christ" and later had the editor charged for mailing a free-love pamphlet. Bennett was prosecuted, subjected to a widely publicized trial, and imprisoned in the Albany Penitentiary for 11 months.

Comstock was also opposed to woman suffragists, notably Victoria Claflin Woodhull and her sister Tennessee Celeste Claflin. The men's journal The Days' Doings popularized images of the sisters for three years and was instructed by its editor (while Comstock was present) to stop producing lewd images. Comstock also took legal action against the paper for advertising contraceptives. After the sisters published an exposé of an adulterous affair between the Reverend Henry Ward Beecher and Elizabeth Tilton, he had the sisters arrested under laws forbidding the use of the postal service to distribute "obscene material". They were later acquitted of the charges.

==== Lottery operators ====
He was also involved in shutting down the Louisiana Lottery, which was the only legal lottery in the United States at the time and was notorious for corruption.

==== Distributors of sex manuals ====
One of his targets, Ida Craddock, was a mystical sexologist. Prior to her arrest, she made a career of writing sex advice manuals for married couples. She had multiple arrests due to her writings. After the first arrest in Philadelphia, she was let off with a warning. In her next trial for teaching sex courses, Clarence Darrow encouraged her to take a plea deal which resulted in a suspended sentence and her books being burned. In Spring 1901, she published The Wedding Night, a controversial pamphlet advising safe practices during marriage consummation while condemning Comstockery. A judge in Washington DC ordered her to leave the area, which she moved to New York City where Comstock also lived. She mailed her pamphlet to him to inquire about whether or not it was illegal, to which he answered that it was. After using his signature method of ordering her book across state lines under a pseudonym, he arrested her.

After surviving three months in the Women's Workhouse, she was found guilty under a federal trial under the Comstock Act. Prior to her sentencing, she died by suicide. Her final work was a lengthy public suicide note specifically condemning Comstock and the unfairness of the trial, while defending her life work.

"I fully expected that the public press of New York city would duly chronicle this most remarkable invasion of the rights of the people by such an abolishing of the trial by jury; but so far as I could learn, the press remained totally silent."

==== Abortion providers ====
Comstock also arrested the prominent abortion provider Madame Restell. In 1878, he posed as a customer seeking birth control for his wife. Restell provided him with pills and he returned the next day with the police, and arrested her. Rather than face the resulting trial, she committed suicide soon after it began.

=== Magnitude of impact ===
Through his various campaigns, he destroyed 15 tons of books, 284,000 pounds of plates for printing "objectionable" books, and nearly 4,000,000 pictures.

According to Harper's Weekly, "Up to 1914, Mr. Comstock had caused to be arraigned in state and federal courts 3,697 persons, of whom 2740 were either convicted or pleaded guilty. On these were imposed fines to the extent of $237,134.30 and imprisonments to the length of 565 years, 11 months, and 20 days....To this remarkable record of activity can be added since that date 176 arrests and 141 convictions."

He claimed that "books are feeders for brothels."

Comstock boasted that he was responsible for 4,000 arrests. Biographers attribute 15 suicides to Comstock's relentless prosecutions.

== Advocacy ==
He later lectured to college audiences and wrote newspaper articles to sustain his causes.

== Opponents ==
During his career, Comstock made many and diverse enemies, such as Emma Goldman, Ida Craddock and Margaret Sanger. In her autobiography, Goldman referred to Comstock as the leader of America's "moral eunuchs."

The anarchist and Free Speech League member Edwin C Walker was a staunch critic of Anthony Comstock. He confronted him several times and published a book entitled Who is the Enemy: Anthony Comstock or You? where he harshly criticized Comstock's actions and ideas.

== Injuries ==
In later years his health was affected by a severe blow to the head. On the second of July 1873, Comstock punched a Dr. Selden in the ribs by an umbrella because the latter had called him "sneak", and Selden in response "struck him over the forehead with a heavy seal ring". The following year, Comstock was stabbed in the head by Charles Conroy. Conroy, long a foil for Comstock dating back to 1868, was "an unrepentant two-bit pornographer—whose name even the New York Times couldn't get right, mistakenly reporting him as John or James Conroy in his arrest notices." It has been said that he "inadvertently kick-started Anthony Comstock's career as the most influential moralizer in American history".

== Death ==
On September 21, 1915, Comstock died of pneumonia at the age of 71 at his home in Summit, New Jersey.

== Writings ==
Anthony Comstock authored several books focused on the theme of vice suppression, including Frauds Exposed; or, How the People Are Deceived and Robbed, and Youth Corrupted (New York: J. Howard Brown, 1880), Traps for the Young (New York: Funk and Wagnalls, 1883), and Morals versus Art (New York: J. S. Ogilvie and Company, 1877). These works explore various aspects of societal corruption and the perceived moral degradation of the youth.

- Frauds Exposed (1880)
- Traps for the Young (1883)
- Gambling Outrages (1887)
- Morals Versus Art (1887)

He wrote numerous magazine articles relating to similar subjects.

== Legacy ==
The term "comstockery", meaning "censorship because of perceived obscenity or immorality", was coined in an editorial in The New York Times in 1895.

George Bernard Shaw used the term in 1905 after Comstock had alerted the New York City police to the content of Shaw's play Mrs. Warren's Profession. Shaw remarked that "Comstockery is the world's standing joke at the expense of the United States. Europe likes to hear of such things. It confirms the deep-seated conviction of the Old World that America is a provincial place, a second-rate country-town civilization after all." Comstock thought of Shaw as an "Irish smut dealer."

Before his death, Comstock attracted the interest of a young law student, J. Edgar Hoover, who showed interest in his causes and methods.

He is thought to be a major influence for the main antagonist of BioShock Infinite, Zachary Hale Comstock, as they share the same last names and have numerous ideological similarities.

== Biographies ==
Anthony Comstock: Roundsman of the Lord (1927), Heywood Broun and Margaret Leech of the Algonquin Round Table, examines Comstock's personal history and his investigative, surveillance, and law enforcement techniques.

Lust on Trial: Censorship and the Rise of American Obscenity in the Age of Anthony Comstock (2018), Columbia University Press, by Amy B. Werbel, presents a colorful journey through Comstock's career that doubles as a new history of post–Civil War America's risqué visual and sexual culture.

The Man Who Hated Women: Sex, Censorship, And Civil Liberties In The Gilded Age (2021), Farrar, Straus and Giroux, by Amy Sohn, focuses on Comstock's impacts on society, the Comstock Act of 1873, and eight women charged with violating the law.

== See also ==
- Birth control movement in the United States
- Comstock Act
- Fredric Wertham
- New York Society for the Suppression of Vice
- Jack Thompson (activist)
