= Jane Heap =

American publisher

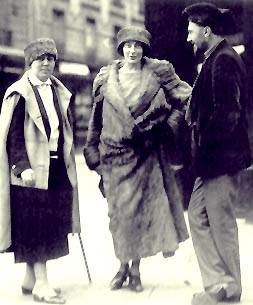
- Little Review reunion, with Jane Heap, Mina Loy, and Ezra Pound in Paris (1921)
- Born: November 1, 1883; Topeka, Kansas
- Died: June 18, 1964 (aged 80)
- Occupation: Publisher
- Known for: Promotion of literary modernism

Jane Heap (November 1, 1883 – June 18, 1964) was an American publisher and a significant figure in the development and promotion of literary modernism. Together with Margaret Anderson, her friend and business partner (who for some years was also her lover), she edited the celebrated literary magazine The Little Review, which published an extraordinary collection of modern American, English and Irish writers between 1914 and 1929. Heap herself has been called "one of the most neglected contributors to the transmission of modernism between America and Europe during the early twentieth century."

== Life ==
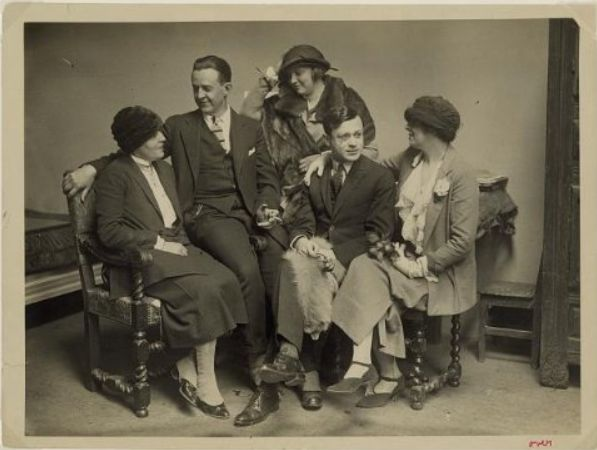
Janet Flanner-Solita Solano Collection/LOC ppmsca.13300. Jane Heap, John Rodker, Martha Dennison, Tristan Tzara, Margaret Anderson, ca. 1920s

Heap was born in Topeka, Kansas, where her father was the warden of the local mental asylum. Her grandmother was related to Sámi living above the Arctic Circle. After completing her high school education, she moved to Chicago, where she enrolled in the Art Institute of Chicago, and continued to take night school classes there even after she became an art teacher at the Lewis Institute.

It was while working at the Lewis Institute, in 1908, that she first met Florence Reynolds, a student and the daughter of a prosperous Chicago businessman. Reynolds and Heap became lovers, in 1910 travelling together to Germany, where Heap studied tapestry weaving. They remained friends throughout their lives, although they often lived apart, and despite the fact that Heap formed romantic attachments with many other women. From the late 1930s, Heap became the companion of the founding editor of British Vogue and head designer at Worth London Elspeth Champcommunal.

In 1912, Heap helped found Maurice Browne's Chicago Little Theatre, an influential avant-garde theatre group presenting the works of Chekhov, Strindberg and Ibsen and other contemporary works.

== The Little Review ==
In 1916, Heap met Margaret C. Anderson, and soon joined her as co-editor of the groundbreaking Modernist magazine, The Little Review. Although her work in the published magazine was relatively low profile (she signed her pieces simply "jh"), she was a bold and creative force behind the scenes.

In 1917, Anderson and Heap moved The Little Review to New York. With the help of poet and critic Ezra Pound, who acted as their foreign editor in London, The Little Review published some of the most influential new writers in the English language, including Hart Crane, T. S. Eliot, Ernest Hemingway, James Joyce, Pound himself, and William Butler Yeats. The magazine's most published poet was New York dadaist Baroness Elsa von Freytag-Loringhoven, with whom Heap became friends on the basis of their shared confrontational feminist and artistic agendas. Other notable contributors included Sherwood Anderson, André Breton, Jean Cocteau, Malcolm Cowley, Marcel Duchamp, Ford Madox Ford, Emma Goldman, Vachel Lindsay, Amy Lowell, Francis Picabia, Carl Sandburg, Gertrude Stein, Wallace Stevens, Arthur Waley, and William Carlos Williams. Even so, however, they once published an issue with 12 blank pages to protest the temporary lack of exciting new works.

In March 1918, Ezra Pound sent Heap and Anderson the opening chapters of James Joyce's Ulysses, which The Little Review serialized until 1920, when the U.S. Post Office seized and burned four issues of the magazine and convicted Anderson and Heap on obscenity charges. Although the obscenity trial was ostensibly about Ulysses, Irene Gammel argues that The Little Review came under attack for its overall subversive tone and, in particular, its publication of Elsa von Freytag-Loringhoven's sexually explicit poetry and outspoken defense of Joyce. The Baroness paid tribute to Jane Heap's combative spirit in her poem "To Home," which is dedicated to "Fieldadmarshmiralshall/ J.H./ Of Dreadnaught:/ T.L.R." At their 1921 trial, they were fined $100 and forced to discontinue the serialization. Following the trial, Heap became the main editor of the magazine, taking over from Anderson, and introducing brightly coloured covers and experimental poetry from surrealists and Dadaists.

== Gurdjieff ==
Heap met G. I. Gurdjieff during his 1924 visit to New York, and was so impressed with his philosophy that she set up a Gurdjieff study group at her apartment in Greenwich Village. In 1925, she moved to Paris, to study at Gurdjieff's Institute for the Harmonious Development of Man, where Margaret Anderson had moved the previous year alongside her new lover, soprano Georgette Leblanc. Although they now lived separately, Heap and Anderson continued to work together as co-editors of The Little Review until deciding to close the magazine in 1929. Heap also at this time adopted Anderson's two nephews, after Anderson's sister had had a nervous breakdown, and Anderson herself had shown no interest in becoming a foster mother.

Heap established a Paris Gurdjieff study group in 1927, which continued to grow in popularity through the early 1930s, when Kathryn Hulme (author of The Nun's Story) and journalist Solita Solano (Sarah Wilkinson) joined the group. This developed into an all-women Gurdjieff study group known as "the Rope", taught jointly by Heap and by Gurdjieff himself.

In 1935, Gurdjieff sent Heap to London to set up a new study group. She would remain in London for the rest of her life, including throughout The Blitz. Her study group became very popular with certain sections of the London avant-garde, and after the war its students included the future theatre producer and director, Peter Brook. Heap also became friends with the concert pianist and composer Helen Perkin during this period.

== Work ==
Apart from her Little Review work, Heap never in her lifetime published an account of her ideas, although both Hulme and Anderson published collections of memoirs, and particularly their memories of working with Gurdjieff. After Heap's death from diabetes in 1964, former students put together a collection of her aphorisms (both her own and Gurdjieff's) and, in 1983, some notes reflecting her expression of some of the key Gurdjieff ideas. Some of her aphorisms are given below:

- Never oppose someone with the same center, always offer another one.
- Do not sit too long in the same place.
- You are responsible for what you have understood.
- Little steps for little feet.
- Suppress natural reaction and pay for it later.
- We never refuse in the Work.
- Animals are nature's experiments and embody all the emotions.
- A cat is all essence. Essence remembers.
- All that falls from the wagon is lost.

== Other ==
In 2006 Heap and Margaret Anderson were inducted into the Chicago Gay and Lesbian Hall of Fame.

== Bibliography ==
- Dear Tiny Heart: The Letters of Jane Heap and Florence Reynolds, edited by Holly A. Baggett, (New York University Press., 1999)
