= Inez Hogan =

American author and illustrator

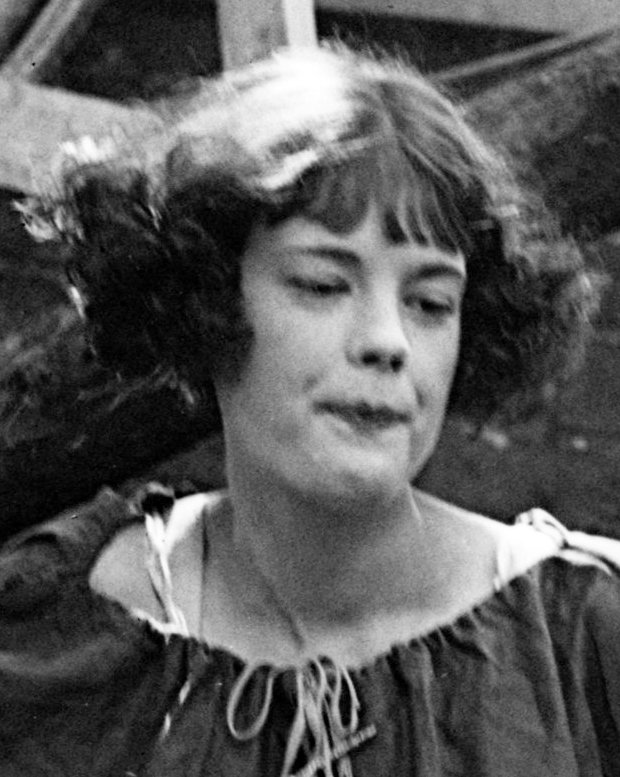
- Illustrator Inez Hogan circa 1921 in a painting smock while a patron of The Krazy Kat
- Born: 1895; Washington, D.C.
- Died: 1973; Orleans, Massachusetts
- Education: Cape Cod School of Art
- Occupations: Author and illustrator

Inez Hogan (August 5, 1895 – February 1973) was an American writer and illustrator of children's books, particularly animal stories. She was born in Washington, D.C., and attended the Cape Cod School of Art. She lived in Provincetown, Massachusetts, and New York City.

== Biography ==
Born in Washington, D.C., Hogan spent her early years in the city. After the end of World War I, Hogan became an acquaintance of aspiring scenic designer Cleon Throckmorton and other Southern artists later associated with George Cram "Jig" Cook's and Susan Glaspell's Provincetown Players. During this period, Hogan became a habitué of The Krazy Kat, an art colony, coffeehouse, and speakeasy located in the back alleys of the nation's Capital. She later permanently relocated to Provincetown, Massachusetts.

During Prohibition in the United States, Hogan operated the only casino-nightclub and speakeasy available in Provincetown. Located on the town's wharf and accordingly titled "The Ship," the nightclub became a gathering place for artists, thespians, and other persons affiliated with the Provincetown Players' Wharf Theatre. Following the end of Prohibition in December 1933, Hogan continued to operate the casino-nightclub, offering drinking and gambling to boisterous crowds on the waterfront.

From the late 1930s until her death, children's books were purportedly her sole means of support. Of this she said "I can think of no happier way to make a living."

Hogan wrote 63 books, including many about her character Nicodemus. She illustrated another 19 books, including the first edition of Epaminondas and His Auntie by Sara Cone Bryant. The black characters in Hogan's books were often portrayed with African American stereotypes.

Inez Hogan died in February 1973 in Orleans, Massachusetts.

== See also ==
- Krazy Kat Klub
- Provincetown Players

== Books ==
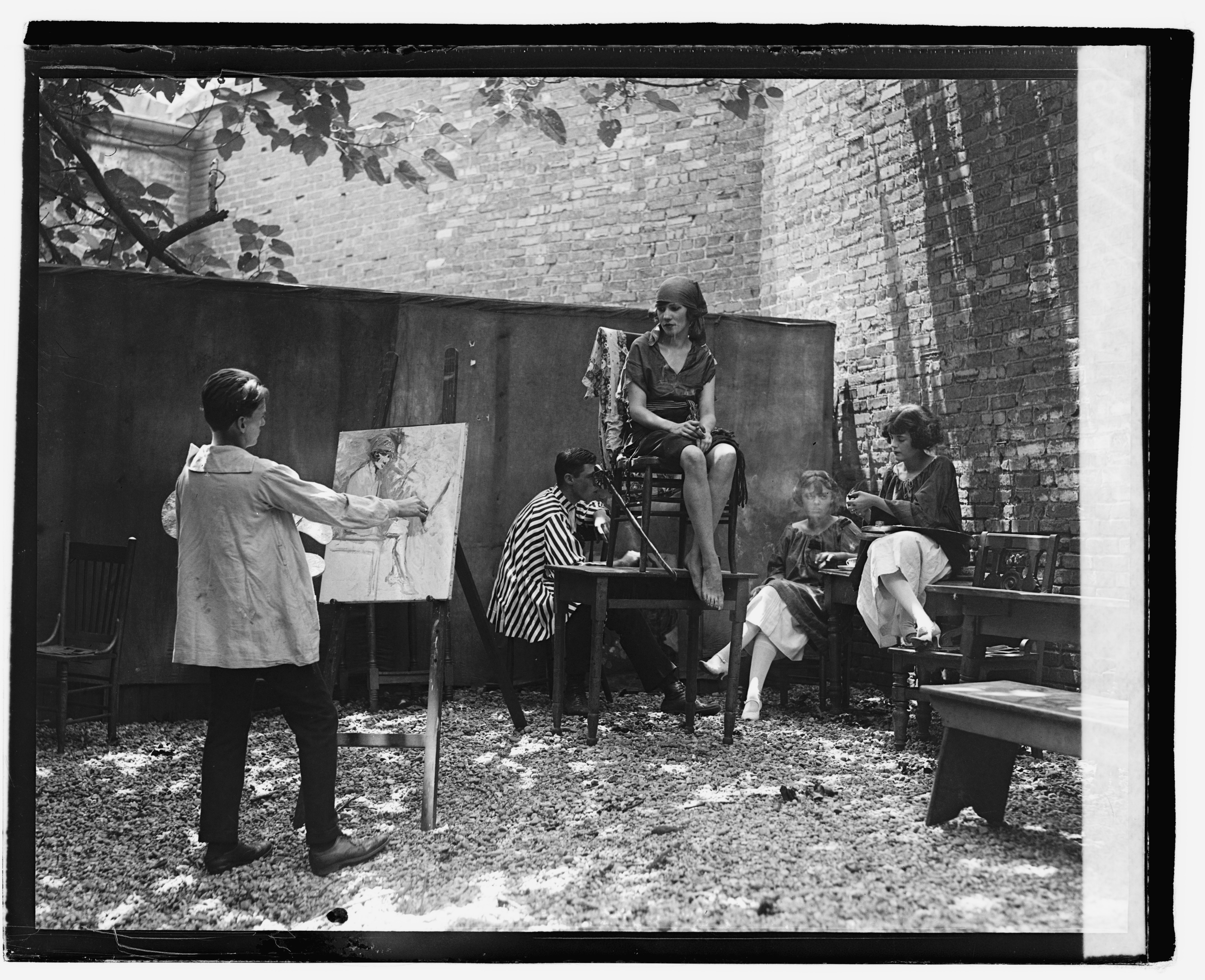
Inez Hogan with a friend at Cleon "The Throck" Throckmorton's outdoor art studio on the premises of the Krazy Kat Klub speakeasy in Washington, D.C., circa late July 1921.

(partial list)

- Animal Tales from the Old North State. Lucy M Cobb; Mary A Hicks; Inez Hogan. Publisher: New York, E.P. Dutton & Co., 1938.
- A Bear is a Bear. Inez Hogan. Publisher: New York : E.P. Dutton, 1953.
- Bear Twins. Inez Hogan. Publisher: New York, E.P. Dutton & Co., 1935.
- Bigger and Bigger. Inez Hogan. Publisher: Boston, D.C. Heath, 1946, 1955.
- Cubby Bear and the Book. Inez Hogan. Publisher: New York, Dutton, 1961.
- Dinosaur Twins. Inez Hogan. Publisher: New York, Dutton, 1963.
- A Dog for Danny. Inez Hogan; Liz Dauber. Publisher: Champaign, Ill., Garrard Pub. Co., 1973.
- Eager Beaver. Inez Hogan. Publisher: New York, Dutton, 1963.
- Elephant Twins. Inez Hogan. Publisher: New York, E.P. Dutton & Co., 1937.
- Epaminondas and his Auntie. Sara Cone Bryant; Inez Hogan. Publisher: Boston: Houghton Mifflin, 1938.
- The Four Funny Men. Erlin Hogan; Inez Hogan. Publisher: New York, E.P. Dutton & Co., 1939.
- Fox Twins. Inez Hogan. Publisher: New York, Dutton, 1964.
- Giraffe Twins. Inez Hogan. Publisher: New York, E.P. Dutton, 1948.
- Little Lost Bear. Inez Hogan. Publisher: New York, Dutton, 1960.
- The Little Ones. Inez Hogan. Publisher: New York, Dutton, 1956.
- The Littlest Bear. Inez Hogan. Publisher: New York, Dutton, 1959.
- The Littlest Satellite. Inez Hogan. Publisher: New York, Dutton, 1958.
- The Lone Wolf. Inez Hogan. Publisher: New York, Dutton, 1961.
- Me. Inez Hogan. Publisher: New York, Dutton, 1954.
- Monkey See Monkey Do. Inez Hogan. Publisher: New York : E.P. Dutton & Co., 1960.
- Mule Twins. Inez Hogan. Publisher: New York, Dutton & Co., 1939.
- Nappy has a New Friend. Inez Hogan. Publisher: Dutton & Co., 1947.
- Ned and Nancy. Inez Hogan. Publisher: Boston, Heath, 1955.
- Nicodemus and the Goose. Inez Hogan. Schomburg Children's Collection. Publisher: New York: E.P. Dutton, 1945.
- Nicodemus Runs Away. Inez Hogan. Publisher: Dutton, 1942.
- Petunia Be Keerful. Inez Hogan. Publisher: Racine, Whitman, 1934.
- Read to Me about Nono, the Baby Elephant. Inez Hogan. Publisher: New York : E.P. Dutton, 1947.
- Runaway Stories: Folk Tales and Nursery Rimes. Inez Hogan. Publisher: New York: Newson & Co., 1928.
- Twin Kittens. Inez Hogan. Publisher: New York, Dutton, 1958.
- Twin Lambs. Inez Hogan. Publisher: Dutton, 1951.
- Twin Otters and the Indians. Inez Hogan. Publisher: New York, Dutton, 1962.
- Twin Seals. Inez Hogan. Publisher: E.P. Dutton, Feb. 1940.
- We Are a Family. Inez Hogan. Publisher: New York Dutton, 1952.
- The White Kitten and the Blue Plate. Inez Hogan. Publisher: New York, The MacMillan Company, 1930.
