= Cowing =

Cowing is another name for intimidation.

Cowing is also a surname. Notable people with the surname include:

- Jacob Cowing (born 2001), American football wide receiver
- Keith Cowing, American astrobiologist and NASA employee
- Roberta Cowing (1860–1924), American artist for the United States Department of Agriculture
