= Krazy Kat Klub =

Jazz Age speakeasy in Washington, D.C.

- "The Kat"
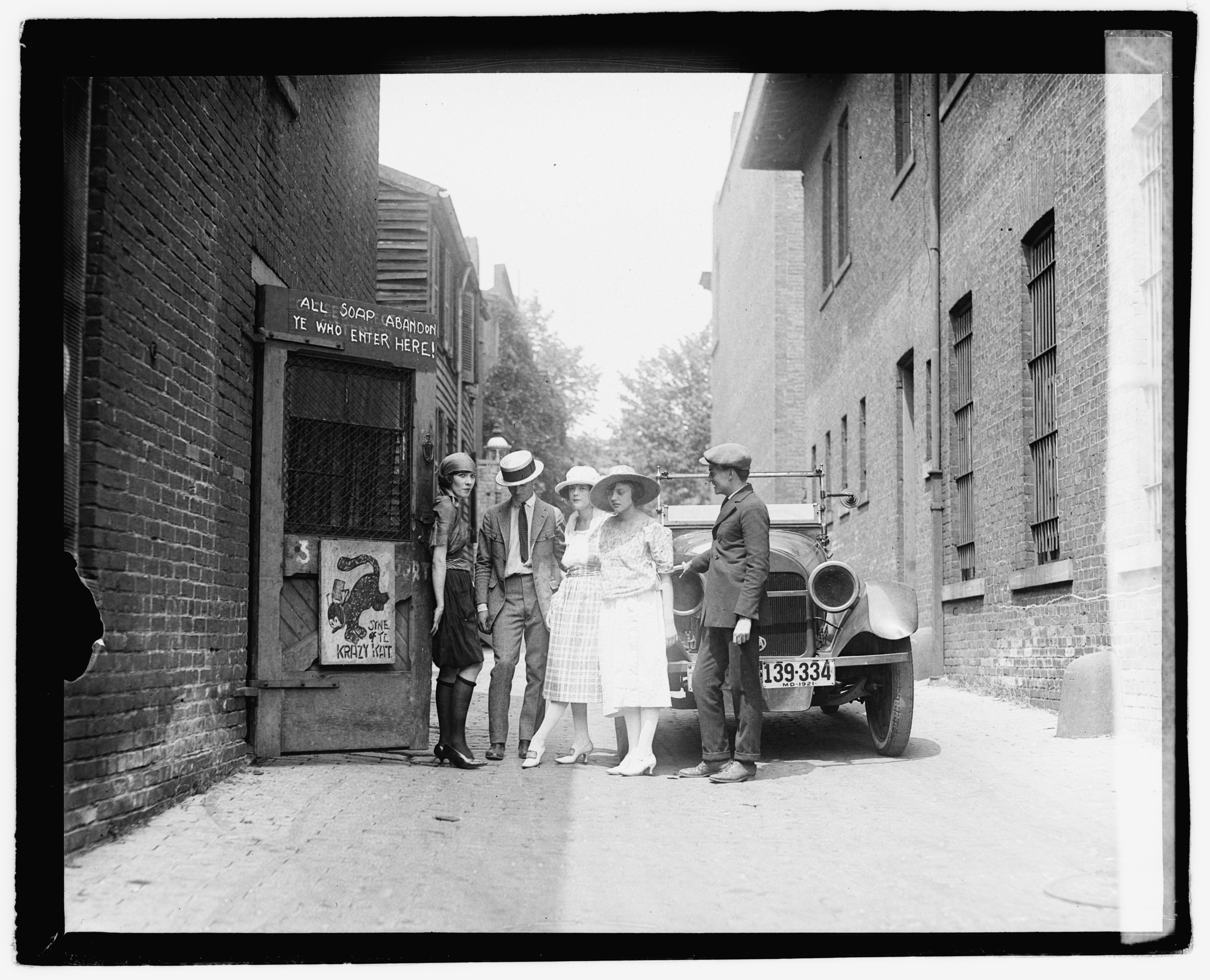
- Patrons at The Kat in July 1921: Cleon Throckmorton (right), Kathryn Mullin (left), Inez Hogan (middle). The chalk-written message above the door, "All soap [sic] abandon ye who enter here!", refers to the warning over the entrance to Hell in Dante's Inferno. (Note: In 1890, Henry Wadsworth Longfellow translated Dante's sentence as "All hope abandon, ye who enter in!")
- Interactive map of Krazy Kat Klub
- Address: 3 Green Court; Washington, D.C. United States
- Coordinates: 38.904°N 77.031°W
- Owner: John Ledru Stiffler, Jawne (Note: Although his name was "John Donn Allen", he changed the spelling of his first name to Jawne.) Donn Allen & Cleon Throckmorton

Construction
- Opened: January 1919
- Closed: June 1922 (equipment/fixtures sold); 1925 (building demolished)

The Krazy Kat Klub—also known as The Kat and Throck's Studio—was a bohemian coffeehouse and art club near Thomas Circle in Washington, D.C. during the Jazz Age. Founded in 1919 by U.S. army veterans John Ledru Stiffler and Jawne Donn Allen with the aid of scenic designer Cleon Throckmorton, the back-alley establishment functioned as a speakeasy due to the 1917 Sheppard Bone-Dry Act imposing a ban on alcoholic beverages in the nation's capital. Within a year of its founding by Stiffler, Allen, and Throckmorton, the speakeasy became notorious for its riotous performances of hot jazz music which often degenerated into mayhem.

Located in an old livestock stable, the Krazy Kat derived its name from the androgynous title character of a popular comic strip, and this namesake communicated that the venue catered to clientele of all sexual persuasions, including homosexual and polysexual patrons. Due to this inclusivity, the venue served as a clandestine rendezvous spot for the Capitol's gay community to meet without fear of exposure. The Kat's clientele advocated the embrace of free love—"unperverted impulse"—in newspaper articles, and D.C. municipal authorities publicly identified the infamous venue as a "disorderly house," a euphemism for a brothel.

Serving as both an underground gay nexus and a gathering place for artists associated with the Provincetown Players, (Note: Jawne Donn Allen, Cleon Throckmorton, Inez Hogan, Felix Mahony, Charles Dunn, and many others were members of the Provincetown Players or associated with Provincetown's art scene in Massachusetts.) the Krazy Kat became one of the most vogue locations for D.C.'s cultural avant-garde to mingle, including atheists, aesthetes, flappers and philosophers. A Washington Times writer described the venue as "a hidden haunt where one might find in comradeship those divine, congenial devils, art inspired and mad, no doubt". Other habitues included federal bureaucrats during the second term of President Woodrow Wilson's administration.

Existing for years mere blocks from the White House and surviving a number of police raids, the speakeasy likely closed in June 1922 when the owners listed its fixtures and kitchen equipment for sale. By that time, co-proprietor Cleon Throckmorton and his wife Kathryn Mullin had relocated to New York City, taking with them many sketches and paintings from the shuttered club. In 1925, the old livestock stable was demolished and replaced by an industrial building. Today, the extant building adjacent to the bygone speakeasy now houses The Green Lantern, a gay bar.

== Location ==
To whom this missive greets, the darkened alleys lead but to the Kat.

— Newspaper Excerpt, The Washington Herald, June 1921

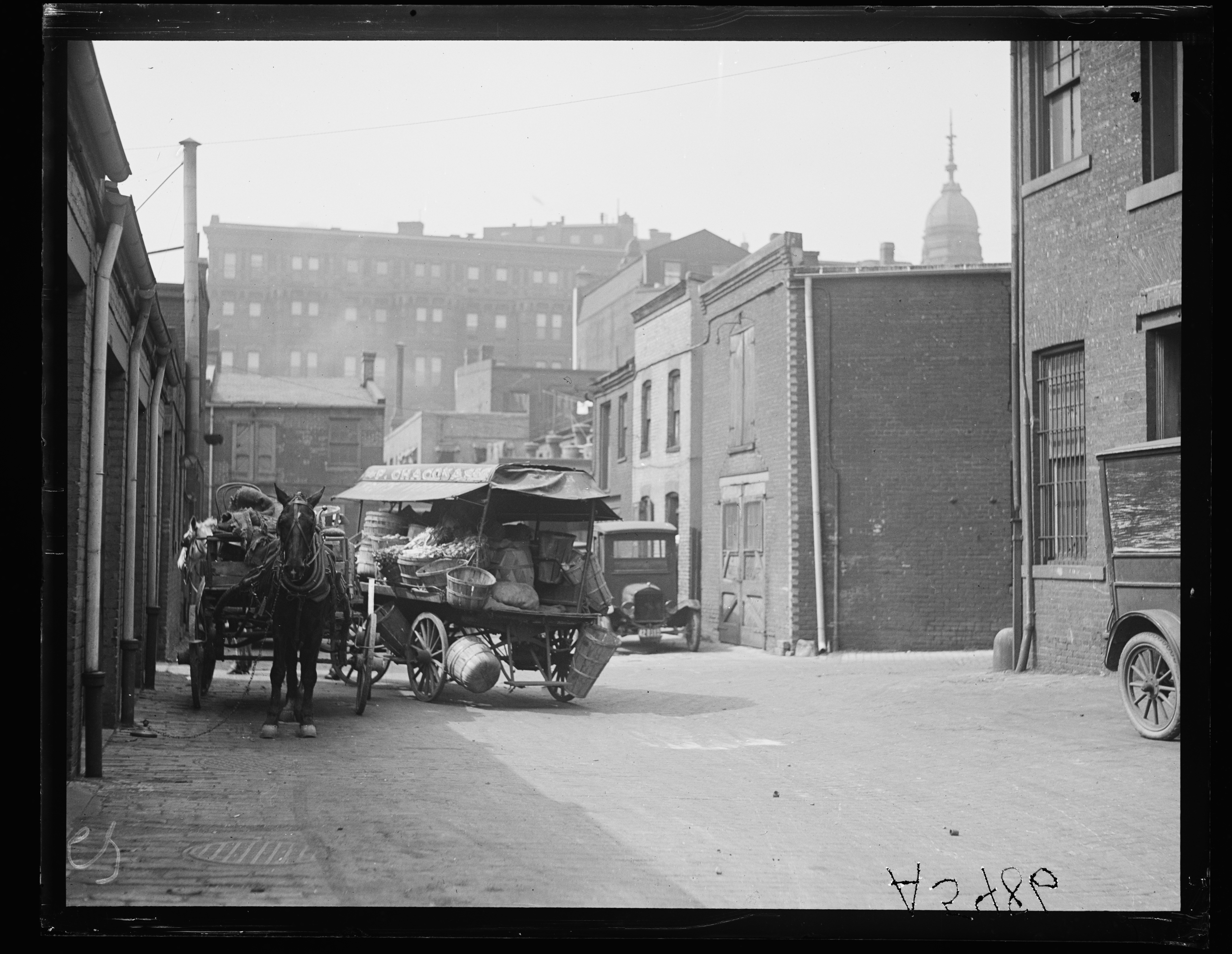
The exterior of the speakeasy, located in the far right, double-doored building on the second floor, above an old livery stable. The dome of Portland Flats appears above it. No photograph of the club's indoor area—the infamous speakeasy itself—exists.

Situated at 3 Green Court alley (38.904°N 77.031°W) between Northwest 14th Street and Massachusetts Avenue, near Washington, D.C.'s Thomas Circle, the Krazy Kat existed in an economically depressed district colloquially known as the Latin Quarter. Located in an old livestock stable that briefly served as a garage for early motor vehicles, the club offered multiple entrances for patrons not wishing to be seen entering its premises, One inconspicious entrance, illuminated by a green light, opened into the narrow red-bricked alleyway.

The alleyway entrance door bore a rectangular hand-painted sign reading "Syne of Ye Krazy Kat" and depicted the cartoon character Krazy Kat struck by a brick. A chalk-inscribed message adorned the top of the iron-barred door with the warning: "All soap [sic] abandon ye who enter here!", a playful reference to the inscription over the gates of Hell in Dante's Inferno. The club advertised its irregular hours as between 9 p.m. and 12:30 a.m. Despite a misleading sign at one entrance proclaiming "The Use of Intoxicating Beverages Is Absolutely Forbidden," the club offered liquor to its patrons throughout its existence during Prohibition.

Upon entering the old livestock stable via the narrow Green Court alleyway, patrons crossed a lumber-littered room and then ascended a narrow, winding, rickety staircase to reach "a smoke-filled, dimly lighted room that was fairly well filled with laughing, noisy people, who seemed to be having just the best time in the world, with no one to see and no one to care who saw".

Livery Stable Blues
The Original Dixieland Jass Band's 1917 recording of "Livery Stable Blues." The speakeasy became notorious for its riotous performances of similar hot jazz music which often degenerated into mayhem.

The club's interior dining area occupied the second floor. Rife with cobwebs and lit by candles burning in old tin cans, the indoor dining area resembled a Greenwich Village coffee house with small wooden tables and rickety chairs, and featured gaudy pictures painted by futurists and impressionists on the walls. As the old livestock stable once served as a vehicle garage before becoming a postwar nightclub and speakeasy, the proprietors burned incense "trying valiantly to annihilate the odors of gasoline which once reeked from every corner."

No photograph of this indoor area—the speakeasy itself—exists. The club's premises included an indoor dance floor and an outdoor courtyard for al fresco dining and art exhibitions. The courtyard featured a tree house cafe constructed from wooden planks and accessible via a ladder.

== History ==
=== Foundation ===
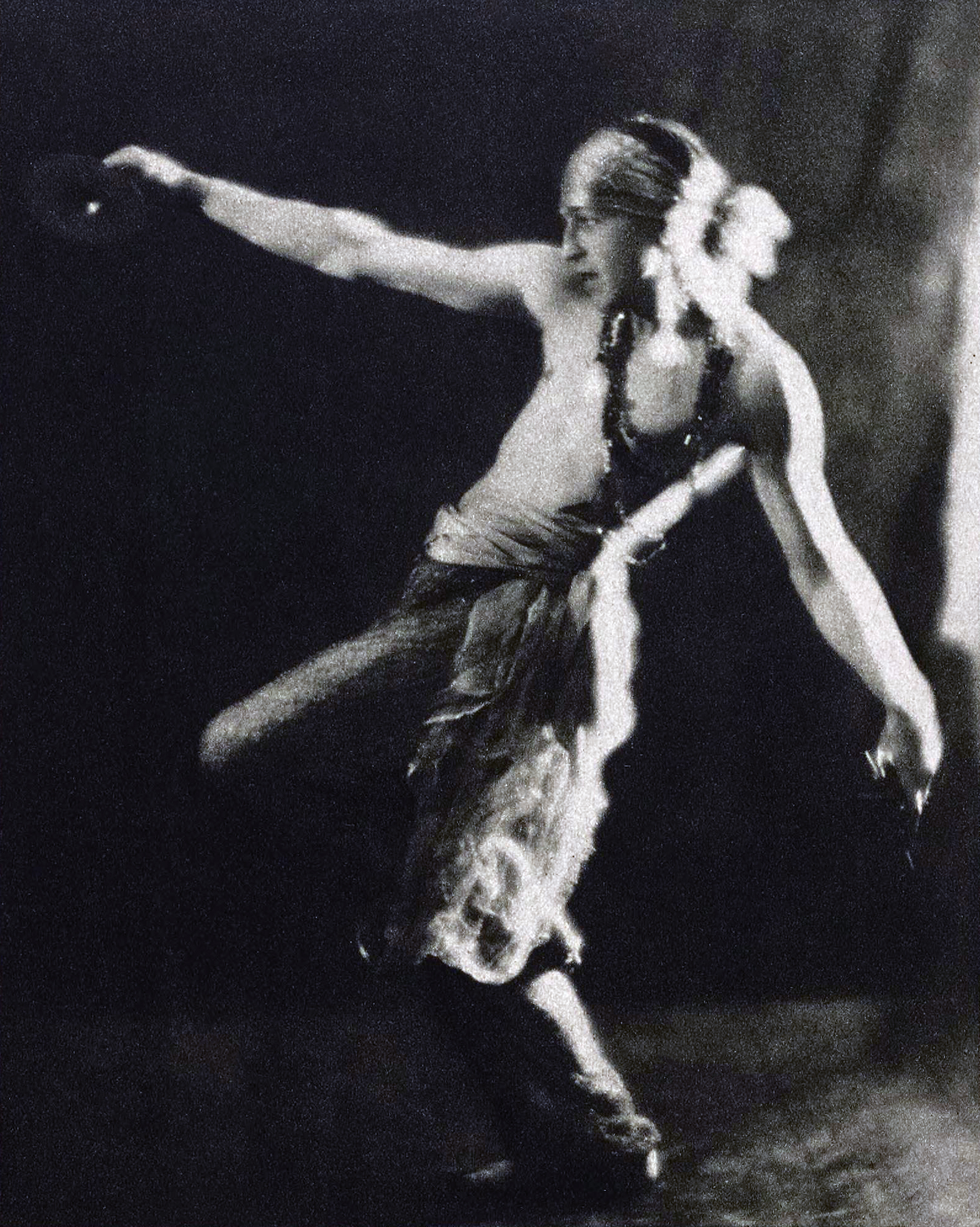
John Ledru Stiffler, co-founder and co-proprietor of the Krazy Kat speakeasy.

On March 3, 1917, the controversial passage of the Sheppard Bone-Dry Act, sponsored by Senator Morris Sheppard (D) of Texas, led to the closure of 267 barrooms and nearly 90 wholesale establishments in the District of Columbia. The law threw over 2,000 employees in D.C. barrooms and wholesale establishments out of work, and the "dry" district lost nearly half a million dollars per year in tax revenue. In the wake of this draconian bill, underground speakeasies flourished in the nation's capital.

In January 1919, two months after the end of World War I and the same month that Prohibition began under the Eighteenth Amendment, army veterans John Ledru Stiffler (1894–1982) and Jawne Donn Allen (1893–1957) met in Washington, D.C., both broke and without support. Stiffler had served in the Engineering Corps at Camp Humphreys and Allen with the Lafayette Artillery Company at Camp Meade. A Times-Herald article noted that, although they had just met, both were artists before the war.

Recently discharged and homeless, Stiffler and Allen founded the Krazy Kat together as a coffeehouse and art club to pursue their artistic ambitions. Stiffler, a classically trained Russian ballet dancer and Carnegie Institute of Technology alumnus, aspired to design murals. His partner, Jawne Donn Allen, from nearby Norfolk, Virginia, studied at the National Fine Arts School and later joined the Provincetown Players. Known for his performances as a Hula dancer, Allen hoped to become an interior decorator. The opening day of their new venue occurred circa January 10, 1919, with Stiffler and Allen serving coffee, chocolates, and "tea" to the first curious customers while still wearing their World War I military uniforms.

Within days of its opening in January 10, 1919, art students, writers, and "uptown slummers" soon flocked to Stiffler's and Allen's paint-splattered, candle-lit venue hoping to find "interesting nights" similar to existing D.C. establishments such as the Vermillion Hound and the Purple Pup. Mere weeks after Stiffler and Allen opened the Krazy Kat, a "maniac assailant"—as described in newspaper headlines—stalked the dark alleyways of the venue's dangerous neighborhood of Green Court. The assailant brutally assaulted, strangled, and wounded victims in locations very near the Kat. Despite the uncaught "maniac" eluding police dragnets and newspapers reporting a "city in terror", such ongoing events did not dissuade thirsty patrons from visiting the after-hours speakeasy in Green Court, and twenty to fifty habitues soon crowded its premises.

=== Bohemian haunt ===
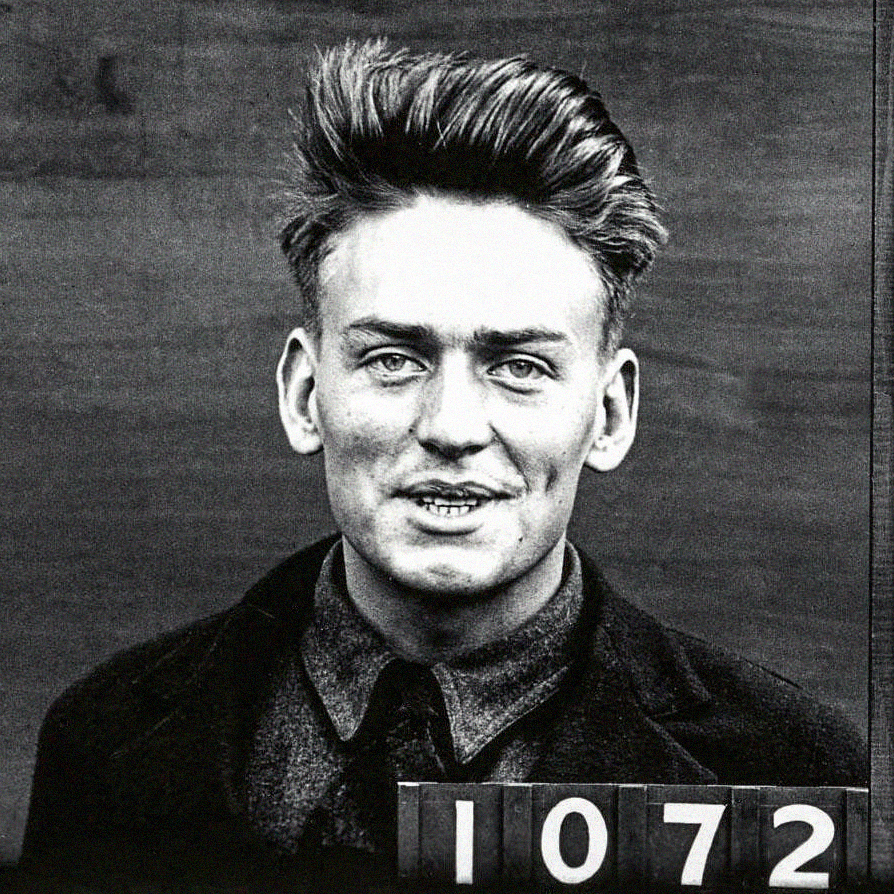
Cleon "Throck" Throckmorton

By February 1919, 21-year-old artist Cleon Throckmorton (1897–1965) joined Stiffler and Allen as co-proprietor after completing his engineering studies at George Washington University. By day, Throckmorton worked as a drama department associate at Howard University, a historically black college. By night, he helped run the speakeasy in the Latin Quarter. A pre-Raphaelite impressionist and aspiring scenic designer, Throckmorton believed that artists should pursue their vocation day and night by surrounding themselves with environs that inspired creativity and the venue fulfilled that purpose.

Throckmorton's fellow artist and muse, 18-year-old Kathryn Marie Mullin (Note: Various newspapers spell her name as "Katherine Mullen" or "Kathryn Mullin". She may have been born as "Kathryn Mullin". One article describes her as born in Horseheads, New York, and identifies her parents as John A. and Kathryn Mullen.) (1902–1994), frequented the Kat. A model, sketch artist, and costume designer, Mullin gained local fame for her stage performances as a ukulele player and singer with the Crandall Saturday Nighters. For her performances, promoters billed Mullin as "The Girl With the Million Dollar Legs." When not performing, she gave public demonstrations of women's saber fencing. Mullin married Throckmorton in January 1922.

Using his considerable skill as a scenic designer, Throckmorton transformed the Krazy Kat into "a most spooky sort of place, weird and crazy as its name." With its courtyard illuminated by paper lanterns and tree house for al fresco dining, the Krazy Kat soon became an idyllic haunt for artists, bohemians, flappers, and other free-wheeling "young moderns". Its clientele openly declared their belief in free love, alluded to by contemporary sources as "unperverted impulse... whatever that is". Authorities quickly took notice of the establishment, and the speakeasy suffered its first police raid forty three days after its opening.

=== Gay nexus ===
I sat on the bench I call "Nighthawk." Two youths passed in front of me... As they passed me the blond one sang the simple title line, "All By Myself," of the popular song, and I looked at him and smiled. He walked over and sat down, breezily asking, "Know of any place where we can find some excitement—or anyway, something doing?"... They had heard of the Krazy Kat and I gave them instructions how to find it... Later he said, "Some old grandmother in an automobile tried to pick me up, but I said—nothing doing." He added facetiously, "I'm just a pure, innocent young girl." The dark lad dryly said, "A bit wise, that's all." They set off to find the Krazy Kat. I felt cheered up after they had gone.

— Jeb Alexander, Diary, August 19, 1921

The venue's peculiar name signaled its openness to patrons of all sexual orientations, including homosexual and polysexual individuals. Its name derived from George Herriman's Krazy Kat comic strip about a love triangle between different species and genders. In the strip, a male dog pines for Krazy, a gender-ambiguous cat, who loves a male rodent "who lives only to vent hostility on Krazy by hurling bricks". Herriman described Krazy Kat as neither "a he or a she," but rather "a spirit—a pixie—free to butt into anything." Reflecting its namesake, Krazy Kat appeared on both the shirts worn by the club's waiters and on its alleyway door, painted with magenta eyes and an orange tail.

Although not the first space for gay persons to congregate in Washington, D.C. as evidenced by the earlier drag balls hosted by African-American former slave William Dorsey Swann during the Gilded Age, the Krazy Kat became an underground nexus for D.C.'s gay community during the Jazz Age, offering a safe space to meet without fear of exposure. Jeb Alexander, a gay D.C. resident and federal bureaucrat, recounted cruising for sex at night in nearby Lafayette Square, located behind the White House, and directing other gay men to the Krazy Kat as a place where they could find "excitement".

In his personal diary, Jeb Alexander described the peculiar venue as a "bohemian joint in an old stable up near Thomas Circle... [a gathering place for] artists, musicians, atheists [and] professors". Although his gay partner C. C. Dasham enjoyed the establishment, Alexander found the milieu too intellectually formidable and feared he would embarrass himself due to his lack of culture. "I'd make a fool of myself by my backwardness," Alexander confided in his diary.

=== Cultural peak ===
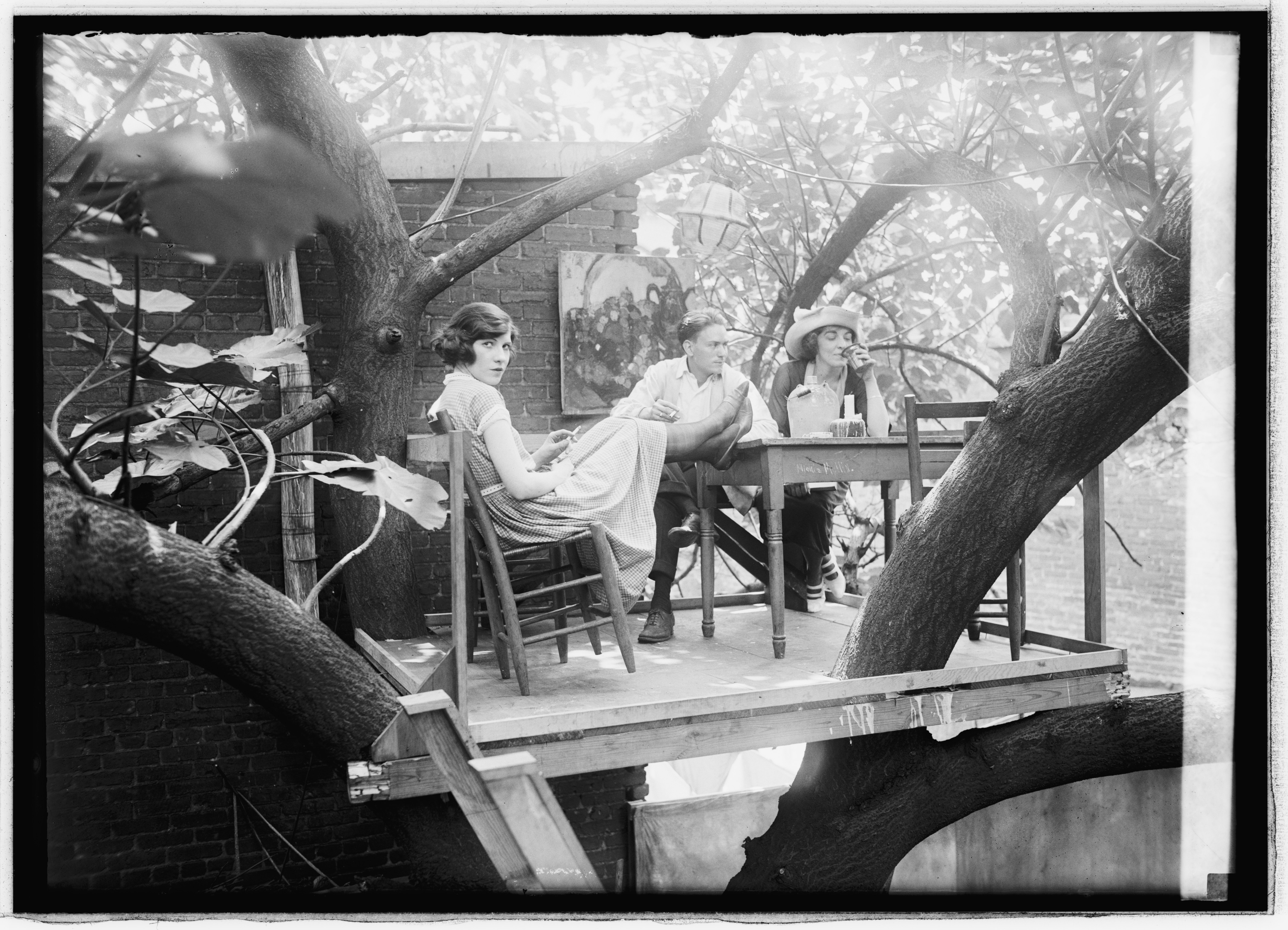
A 23-year-old Cleon "Throck" Throckmorton, 18-year-old Kathryn Mullin, and a friend, possibly Mildred McDonald, wearing a tricorne hat, relax and enjoy refreshments in the club's tree house cafe.

Serving as both an underground gay nexus and a gathering place for Southern artists affiliated with George Cram "Jig" Cook's and Susan Glaspell's Provincetown Players, the Krazy Kat over time became a location for Washington's intelligentsia and aesthetes to congregate during the Jazz Age. Incidents reported in the press included a Frenchman visiting the bar to sketch his slain wife's face on a burlap sack, as well as dead cats left as pranks for drunken patrons to trip over.

The speakeasy became notorious for its riotous performances of hot jazz music which often degenerated into violence and mayhem. "War casualties during the jazz outbursts have been too numerous to mention," wrote a crime reporter for The Washington Post in 1920, "Harsh rumor has it that the Krazy Kat Klub and other choice back alley enterprises have been disrupted as a result of rude un-Bohemian cacophanations." During this period, writer Victor Flambeau visited the establishment and described the milieu in a February 1922 newspaper portrait:

A hidden haunt where one might find in comradeship those divine, congenial devils, art inspired and mad, no doubt, who have renounced the commercial world with its seductive wealth, to gain in solitude or blithe companionship another kind of wealth and fame in self-expression.... When the hours wane, and the candles burn low, and the big fire glows, and over the cigarettes and the cider, the coffee and sandwiches, what do they chat of, these men and women, boys and girls, the would-be writers, painters, poets of tomorrow?

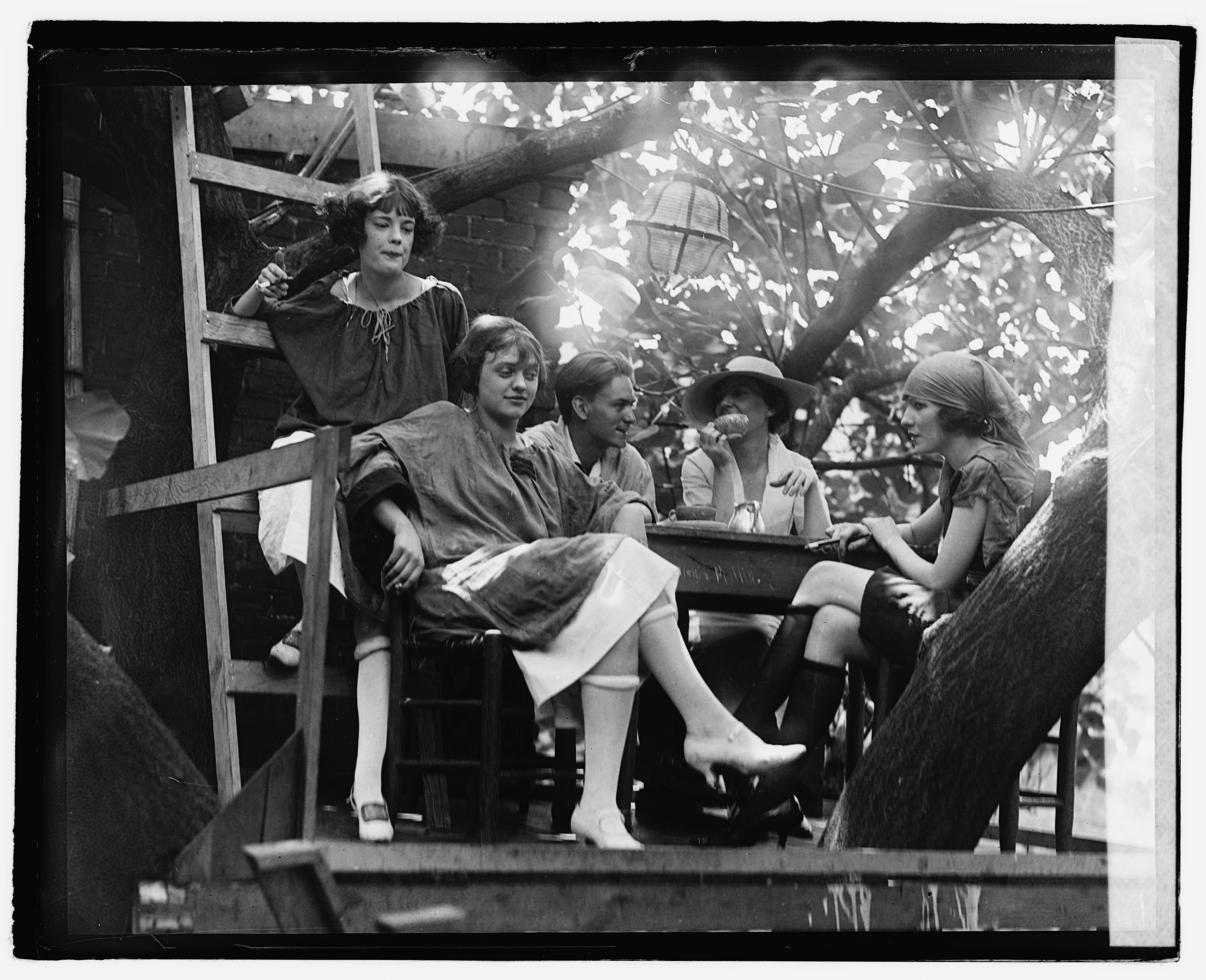
Cleon Throckmorton (middle), Kathryn Mullin (far right), Inez Hogan (top left) and others in the tree house cafe. The flappers wear the rolled stockings and low heels typical of the era's fashion.

The avant-garde venue, frequently mentioned in the press in conjunction with its co-proprietor Cleon Throckmorton, proved to be a tremendous local success, not only as a favorite postwar hangout for painters, poets, musicians, and playwrights—several of whom purportedly wrote their plays on its premises—but as a key local attraction for visitors to the nation's capital. Owing to its widespread popularity, the venue inspired numerous imitators. Within three years of its opening, other bohemian-style restaurants modeled after the Krazy Kat sprang up in Washington, including The Carcassonne in nearby Georgetown, likewise decorated by Throckmorton.

Despite its popularity, authorities took a dim view of the venue's continued presence. During its tumultuous existence, authorities declared the Krazy Kat to be a "disorderly house" (a euphemism for a brothel), and the metropolitan police raided the establishment on several occasions during the Prohibition period. One raid interrupted a violent free-for-all brawl inside the club after a patron fired a gun. Police arrested 25 krazy kats—22 men but only 3 women—described in a newspaper report as "self-styled artists, poets, and actors, and some who worked for the [federal] government by day and masqueraded as Bohemians by night."

=== Closure ===
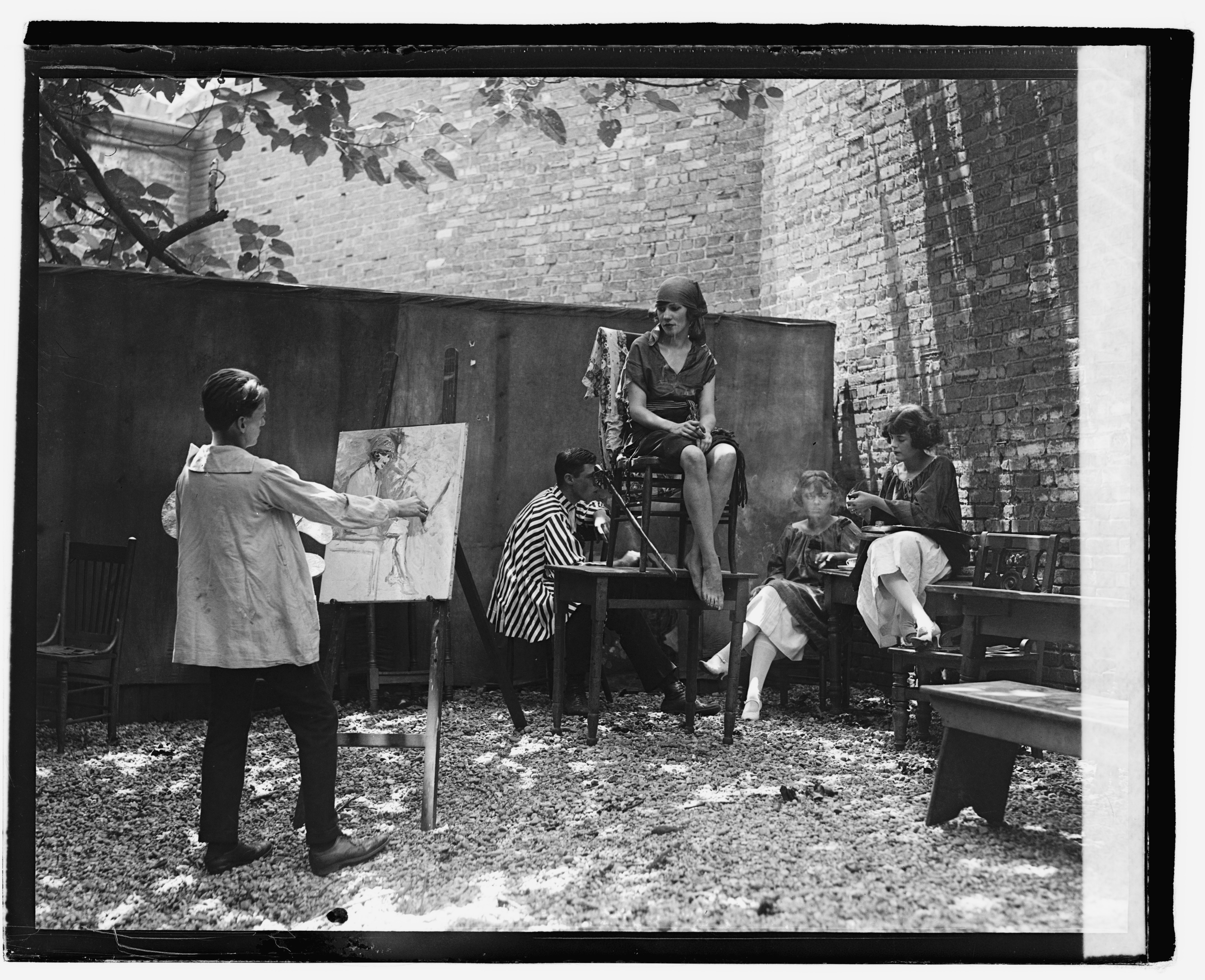
Throckmorton paints Mullin, a stage performer known as "The Girl With the Million Dollar Legs". In the photo, a saber in its scabbard hangs from her waist. A renowned expert in women's saber fencing, Mullin gave public demonstrations of the sport.

Despite the Kat's popular success, Stiffler, Allen, and Throckmorton increasingly spent time elsewhere in the United States. By May 1921, Stiffler opened a dance studio in Chicago, and he performed in a Krazy Kat musical attended by comic strip creator George Herriman himself. He moved to New York City and danced in Broadway shows, such as the Marx Brothers' 1924 musical, I'll Say She Is. Meanwhile, Allen and Throckmorton spent more time in Provincetown, Massachusetts. While Allen studied painting, Throckmorton designed the Provincetown Players' 1920 production of Eugene O'Neill's The Emperor Jones and began a prolific career.

With its original three founders less present in Washington, D.C., the Kat likely closed in June 1922, when the owners publicly listed the kitchen equipment and fixtures for sale, including a canoe and a square piano. In 1925, the old livestock stable was demolished and replaced with an industrial building. Today, the neighborhood is home to The Green Lantern, a D.C. gay bar. By the time of its closure, Throckmorton and Mullin had permanently relocated to Greenwich Village in New York City. They brought a number of speakeasy artifacts with them, including Throckmorton's sketches, which remained on display for decades at Greenwich Village restaurants.

After their relocation to New York City, Mullin caught Throckmorton in an extramarital affair with an unidentified woman—possibly film actress Juliet Brenon (1895–1979)—in their Greenwich Village apartment and sued for divorce on December 17, 1926. Throckmorton did not contest the divorce, and Mullin did not seek alimony. Rebounding from Throckmorton, she briefly married right-wing journalist John Parsons O'Donnell on May 9, 1927. Due to his controversial political views, O'Donnell faced accusations of pro-fascist sympathies during World War II, and the Philadelphia Record publicly denounced him as a "Naziphile," prompting him to file a successful libel suit. In her later years, Mullin remarried again. She possibly returned to the Midwest and worked as a speech specialist for children. She died in March 1994 at age 91 in South Pasadena, California.

On March 13, 1927, immediately after divorcing Mullin, Throckmorton married actress Juliet Brenon, the niece of Irish-American motion picture director Herbert Brenon who undertook the first cinematic adaptation of The Great Gatsby in 1926. In subsequent years, Throckmorton established himself as one of the most prolific and versatile scenic designers for Broadway plays. Throckmorton's Greenwich Village apartment gained a reputation as an after-hours salon for thespians, artists, and intellectuals such as Eugene O'Neill, Noël Coward, Norman Bel Geddes, and E.E. Cummings. Their politically leftward salon raised funds for the anti-fascist Republican faction during the Spanish Civil War.

== Gallery ==
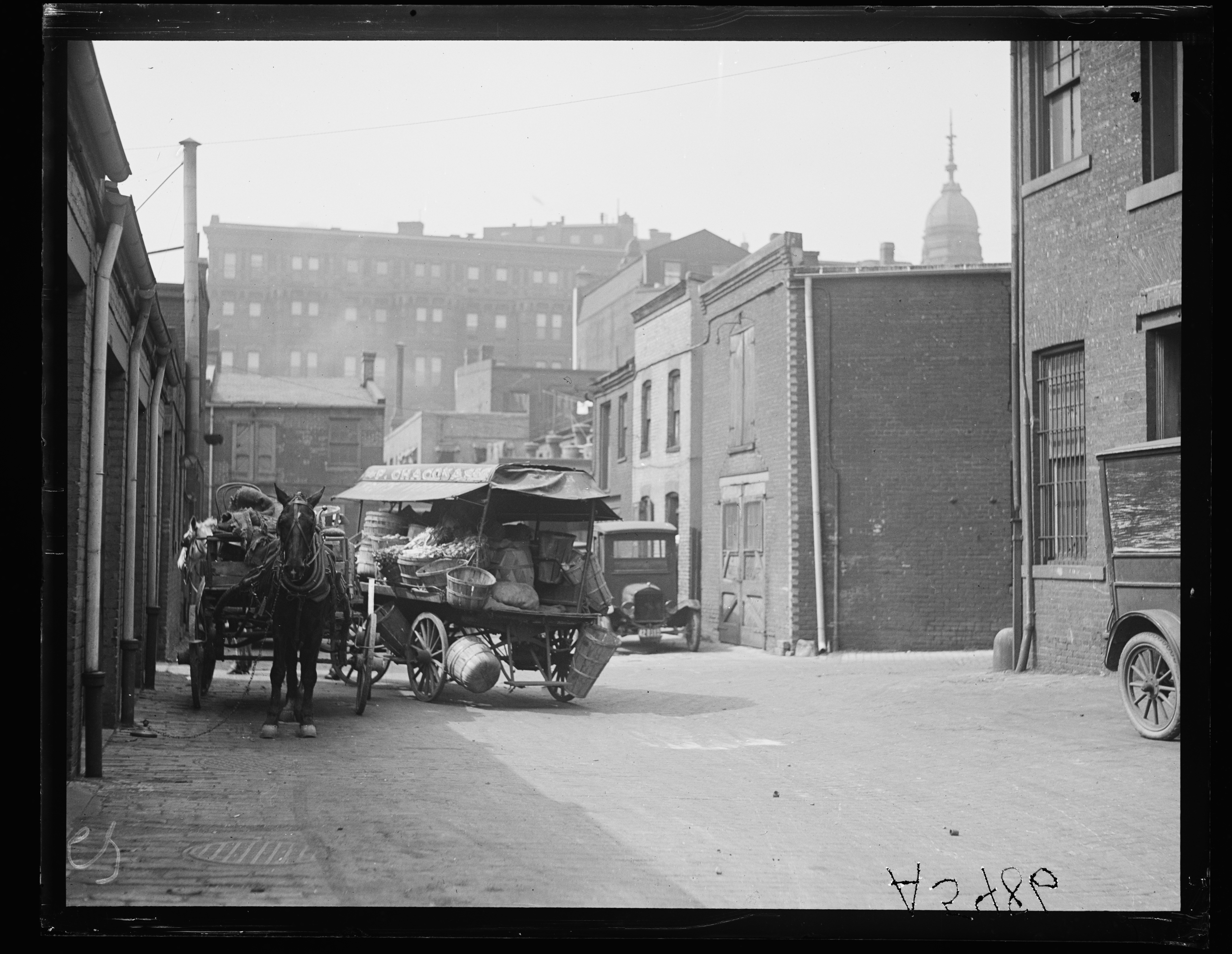
Exterior of The Kat, located in the far right double-doored building with the dome of Portland Flats visible

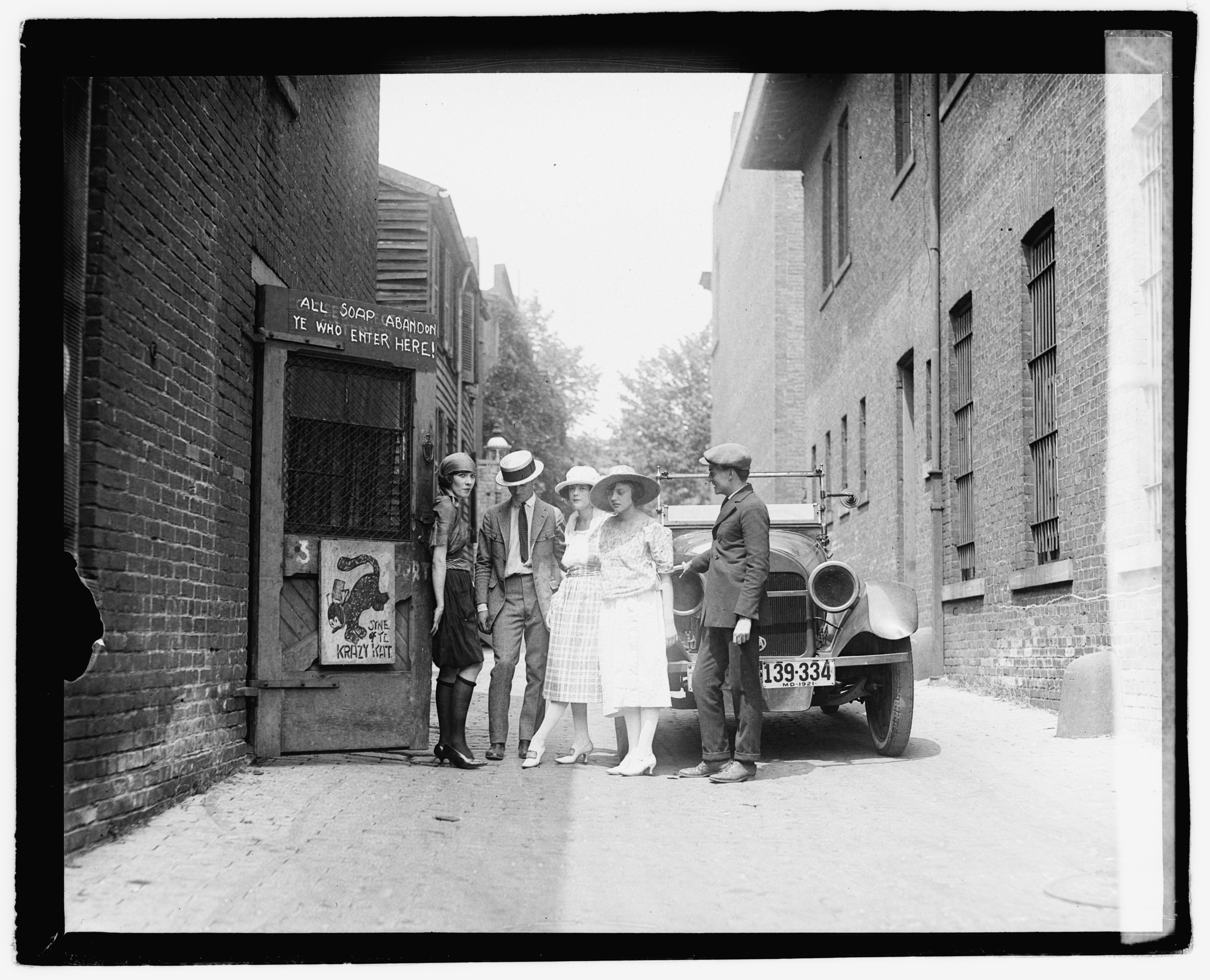
Throckmorton, Mullin, Hogan, and two other patrons arrive at The Kat's alleyway entrance at 3 Green Court

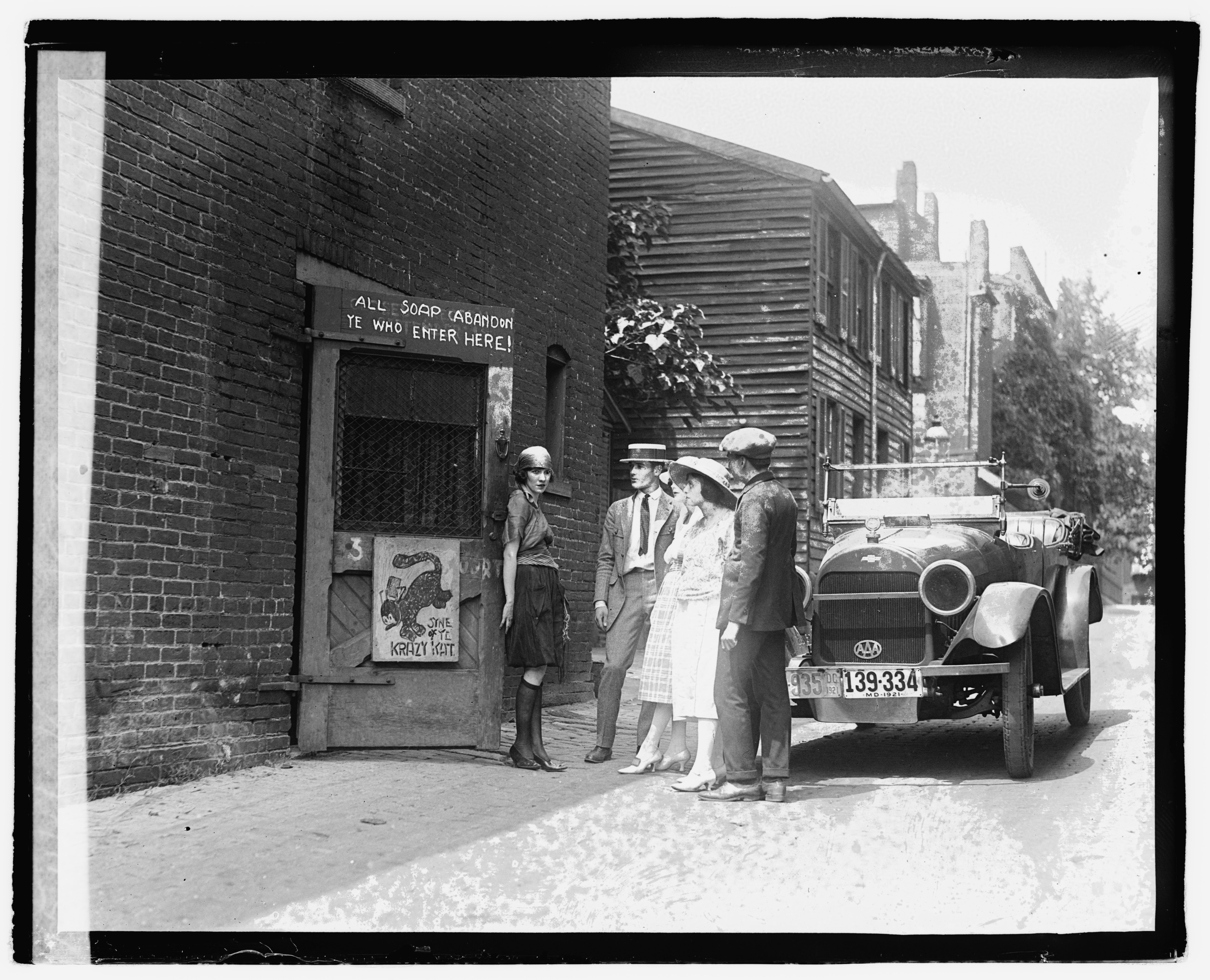
Another angle of Throckmorton, Mullin, Hogan and others with a Chevrolet Model D V8 produced 1917–1918

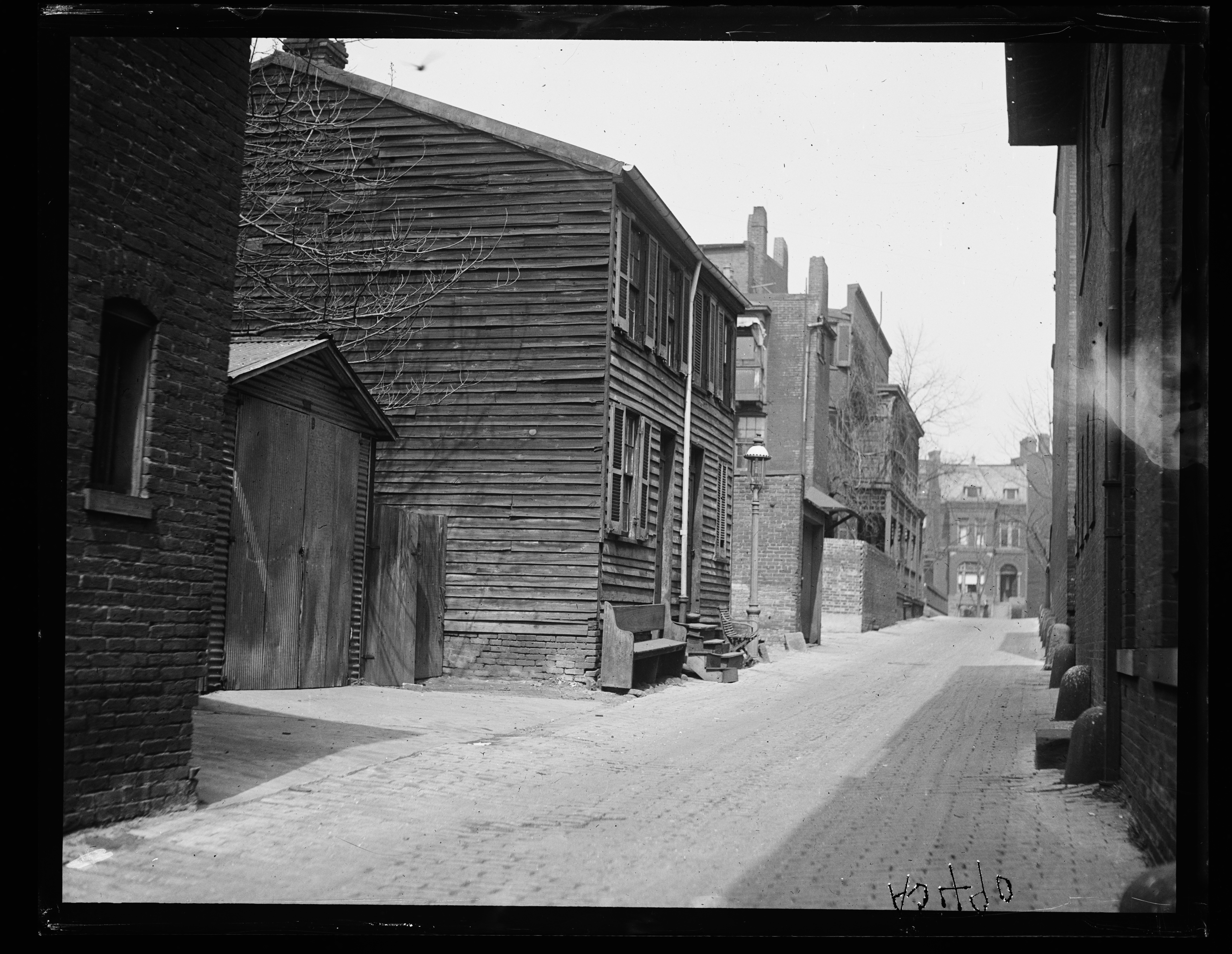
The alleyway behind The Kat. Behind the wooden fence lies the courtyard with the tree house for al fresco dining

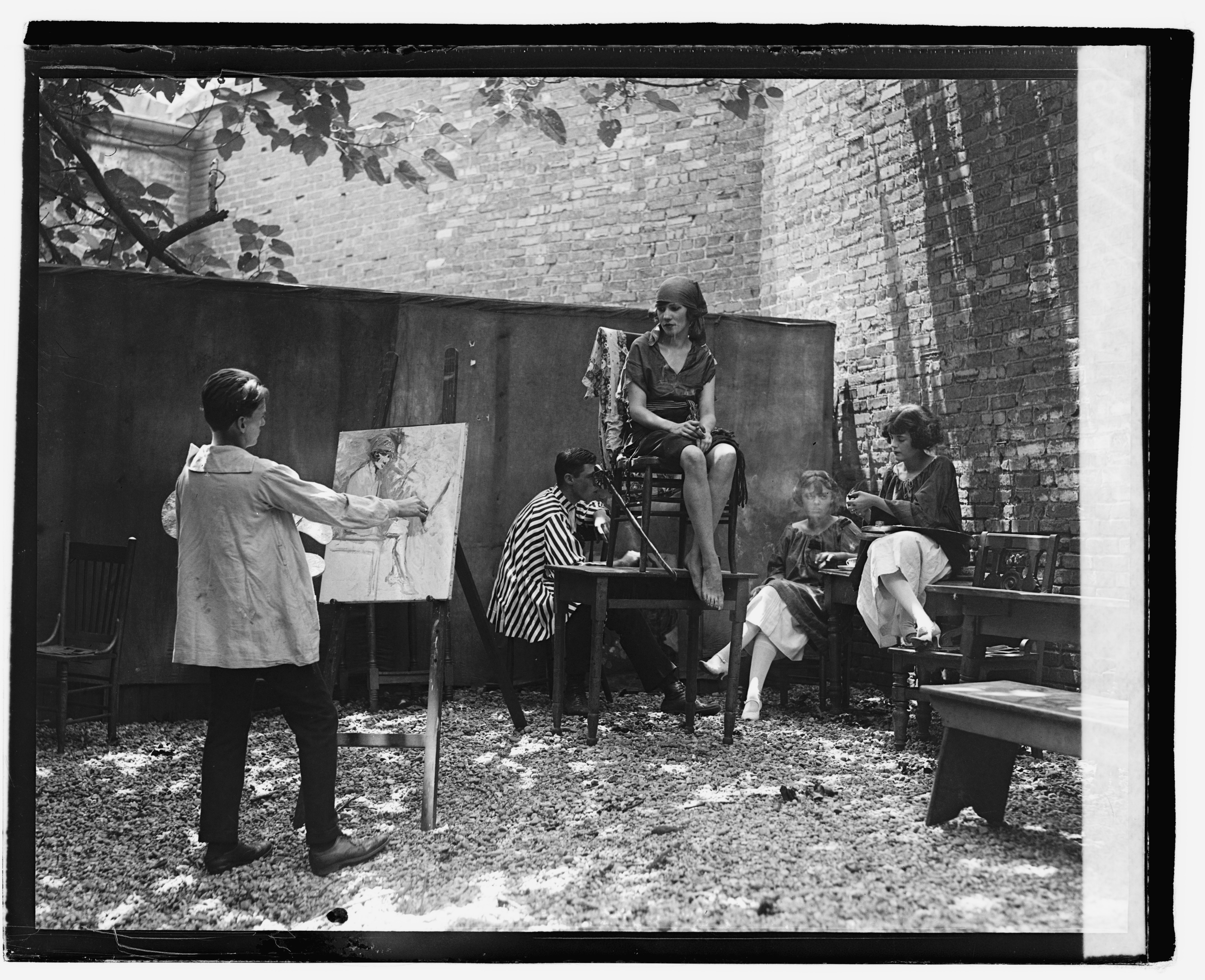
Cleon Throckmorton paints Kathryn Mullin, his future wife, as Inez Hogan in a smock cleans her paint brush

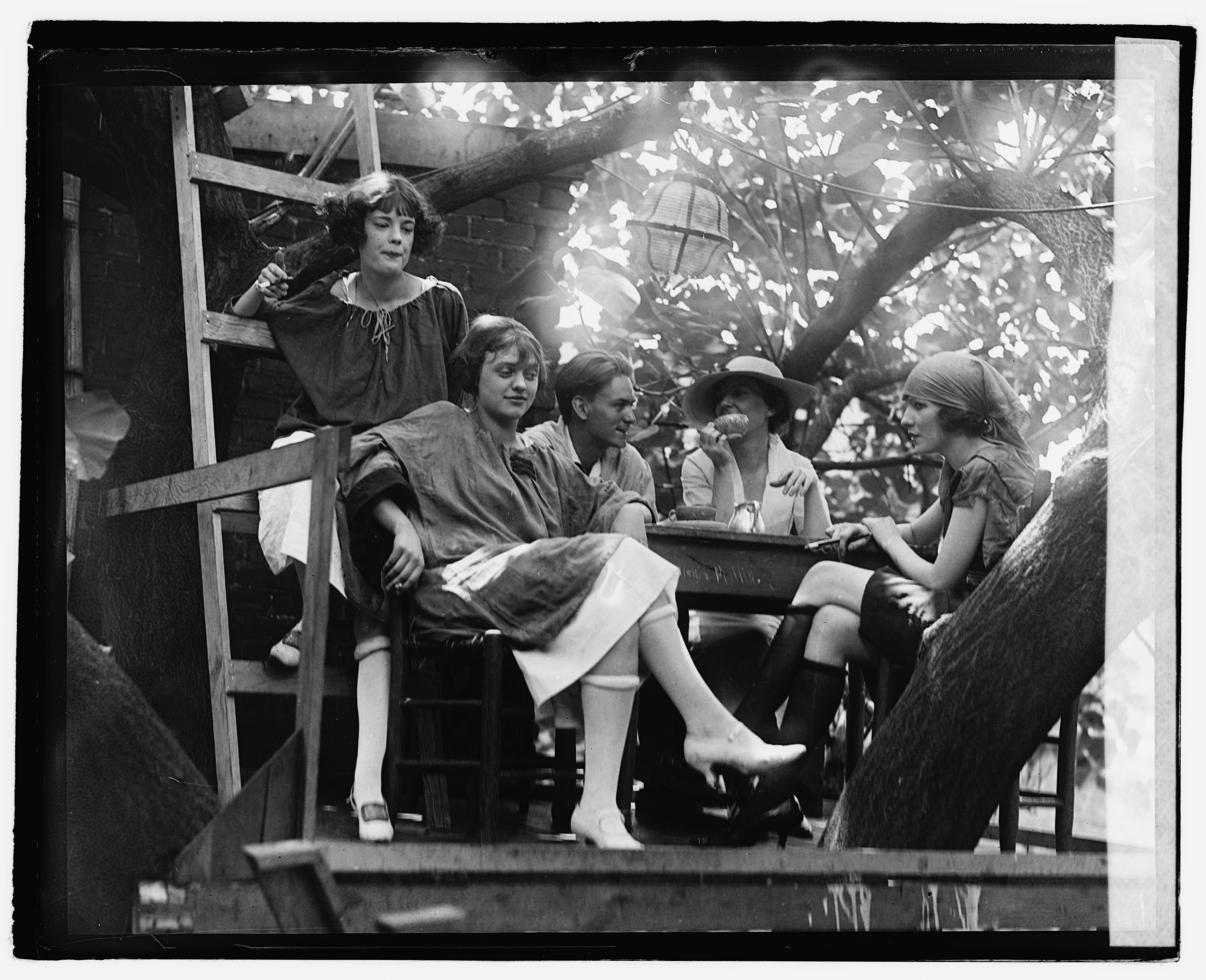
Throckmorton, Mullin, Hogan, and others chat in the courtyard's rustic tree house over "coffee" and cigarettes

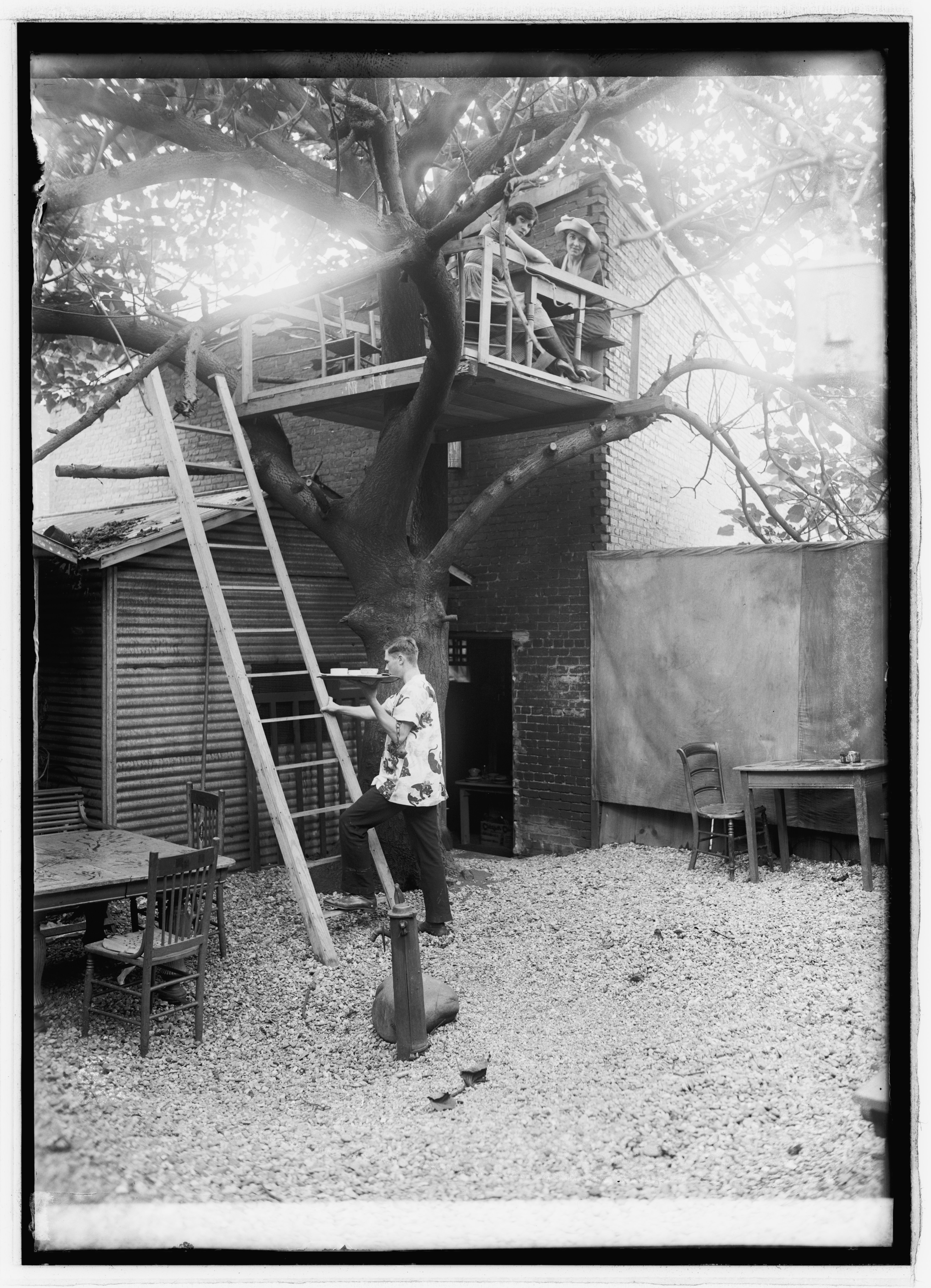
A waiter ascends a ladder to serve patrons in the club's treehouse while Kathryn Mullin waits above.

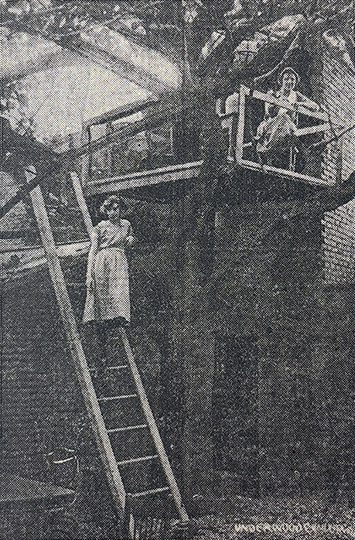
One of the missing photographic plates in the series published in The Washington Times on July 18, 1921.

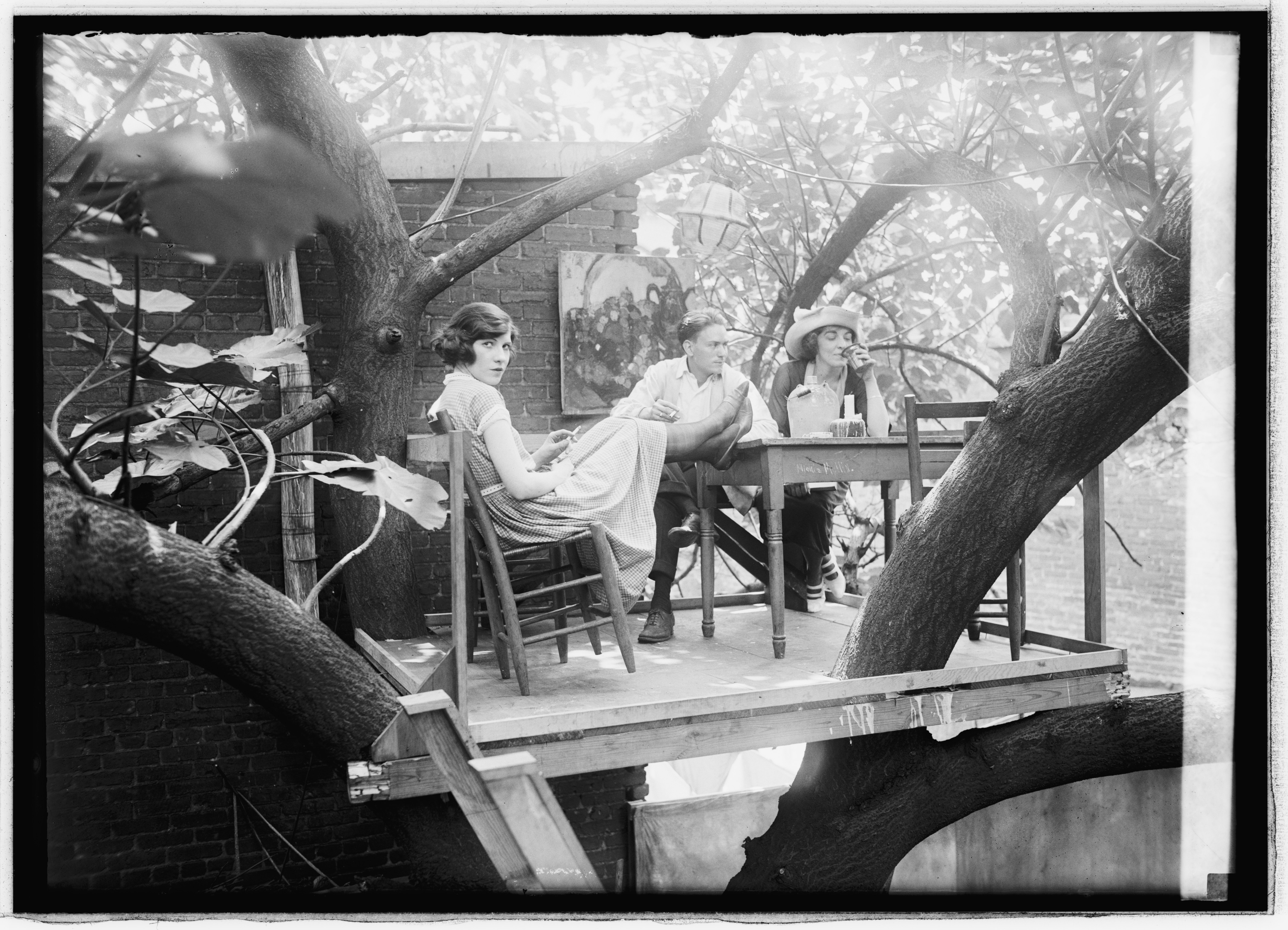
Throckmorton and Mullin relax with a friend in a tricorne hat. The graffiti "Mickie Mullin" may refer to Kathryn's father.

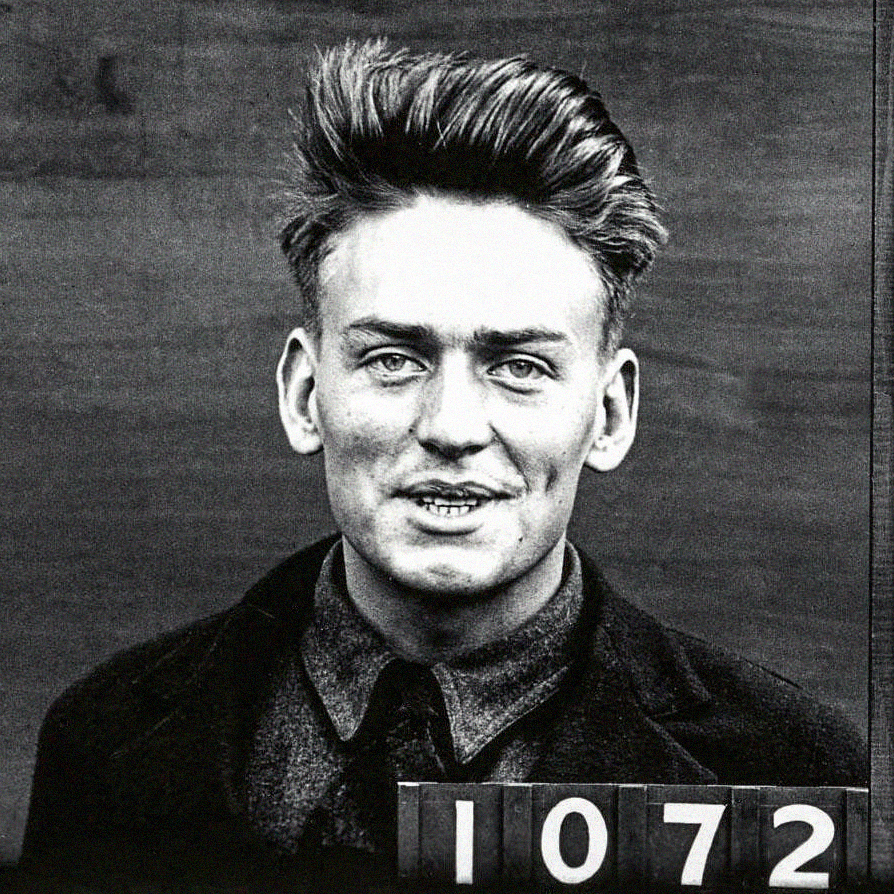
Throckmorton's 1918 employee photograph for the National Institute of Standards and Technology (NIST).

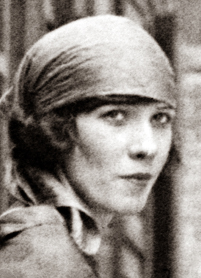
Close-up of Kathryn Mullin (1902–1994), a sketch artist, stage performer, and expert in women's saber fencing.

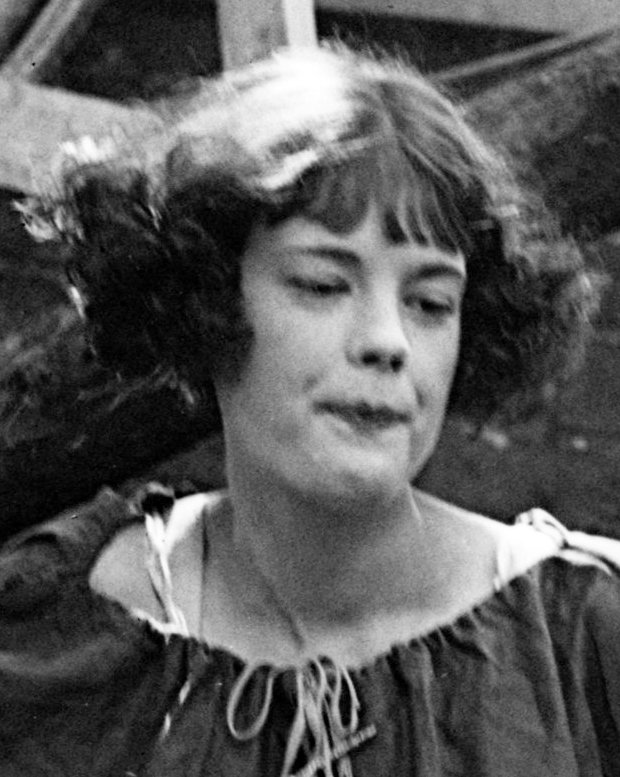
Close-up of Inez Hogan (1895–1973) in a smock. Hogan attained fame as a prolific illustrator of children's books.

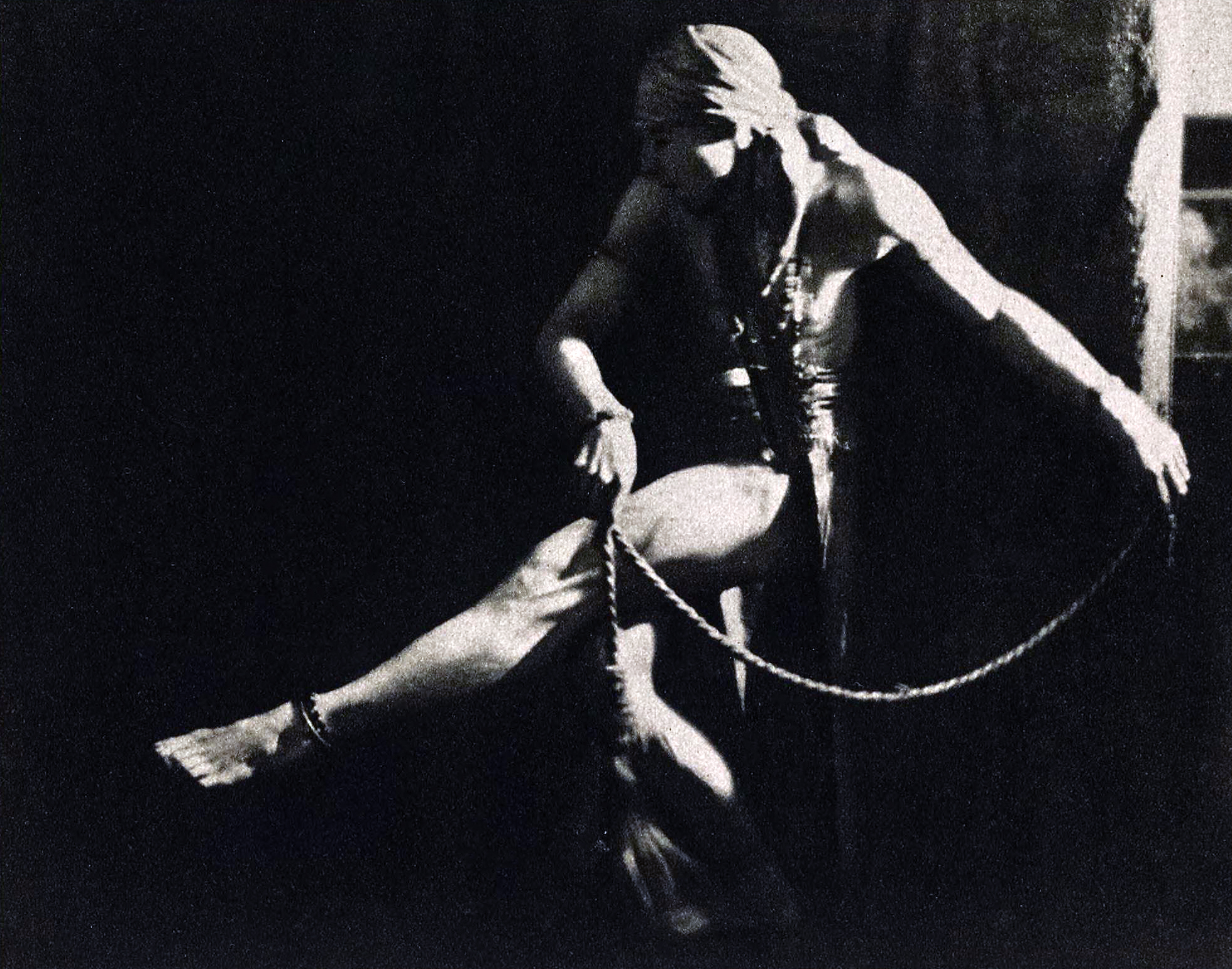
Co-proprietor and dancer John Ledru Stiffler (1894–1982) in a Shadowland magazine photograph, May 1921.

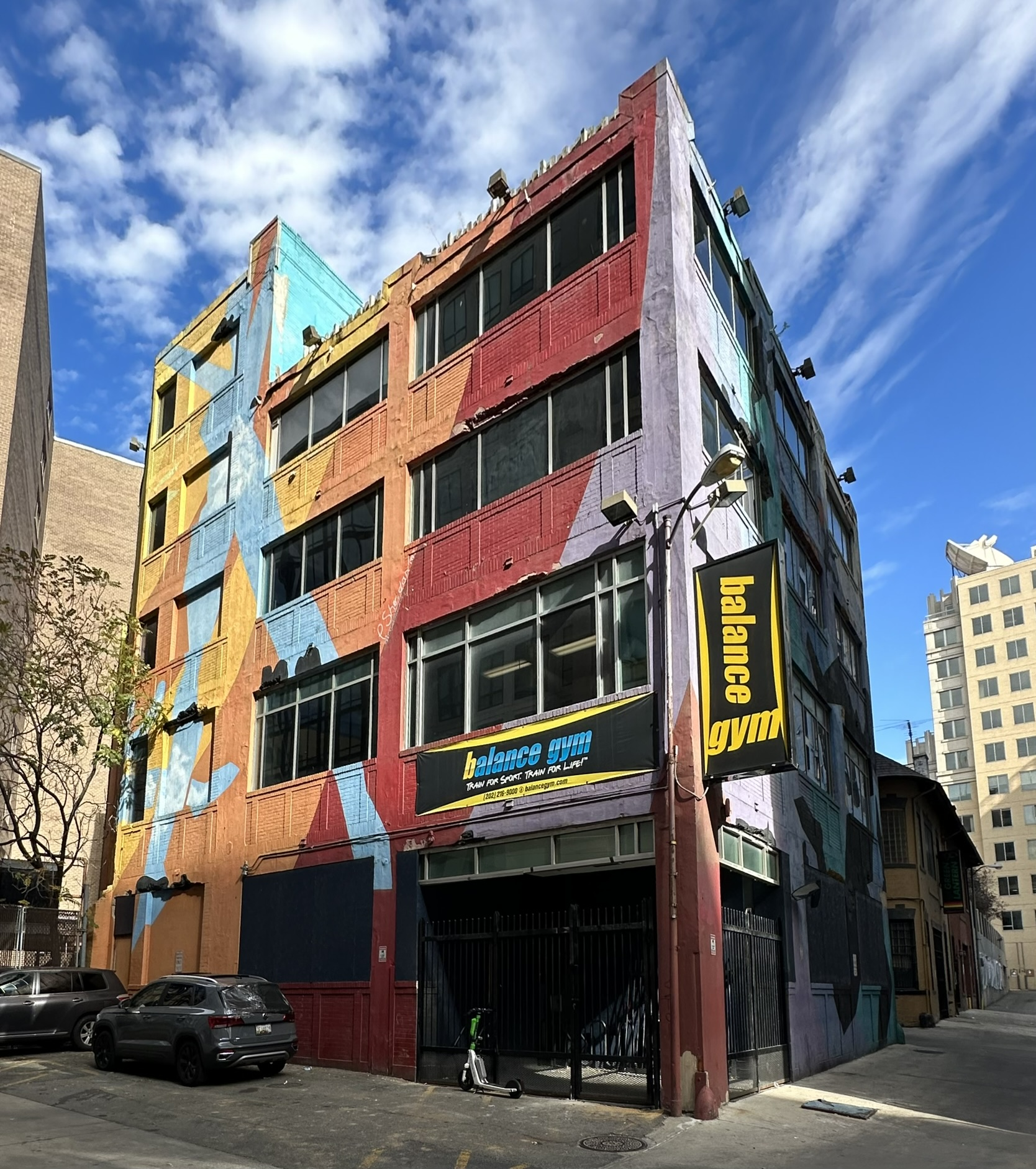
The site of the Krazy Kat in 2023. The entrance seen in 1920s photos is on the opposite side of the current building.

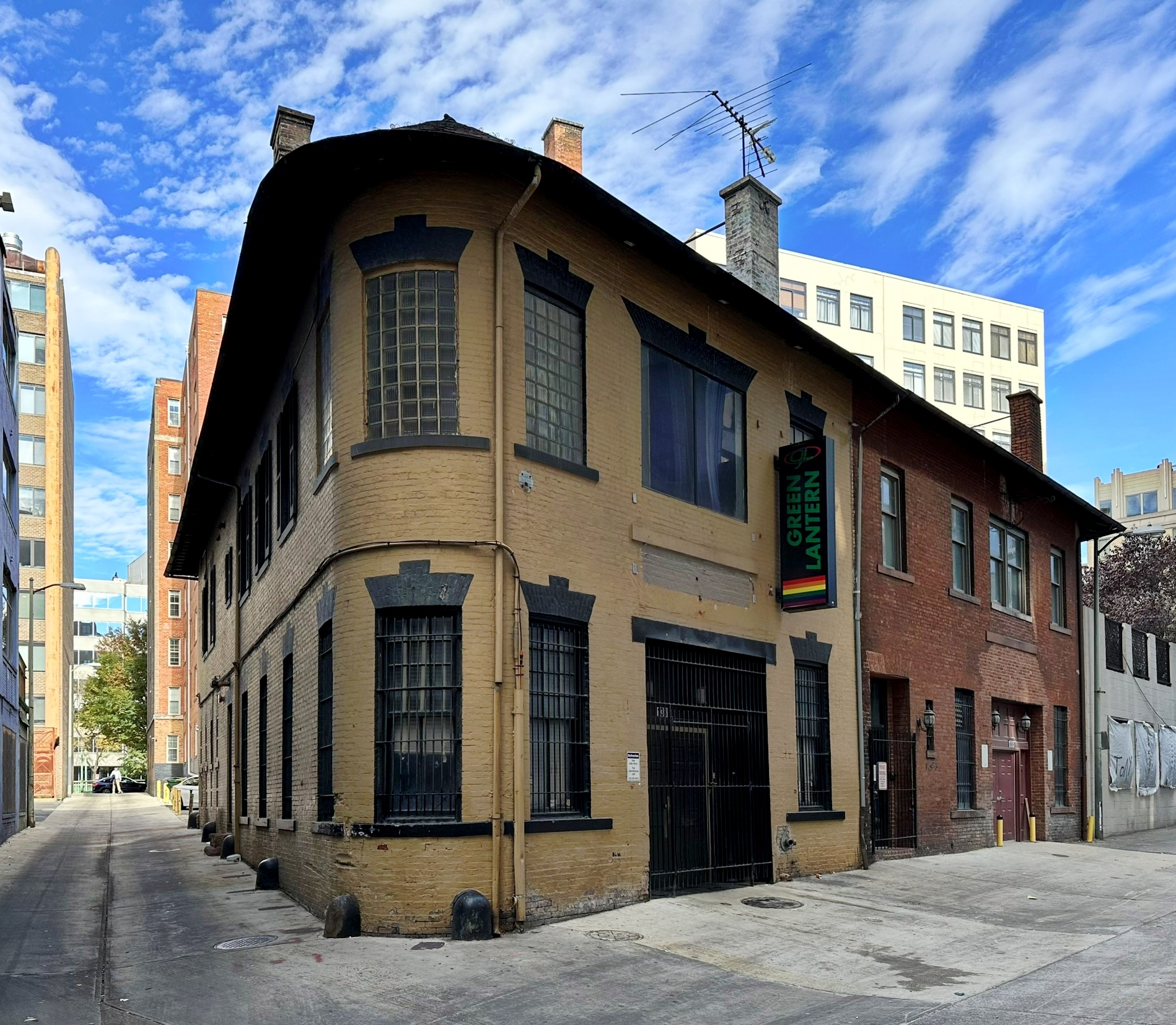
The Green Lantern gay bar. The building can be seen on the right in several 1920s photographs.

== See also ==
- LGBTQ culture in Washington, D.C.
- William Dorsey Swann
