= Cleon Throckmorton =

American theatrical and scenic designer

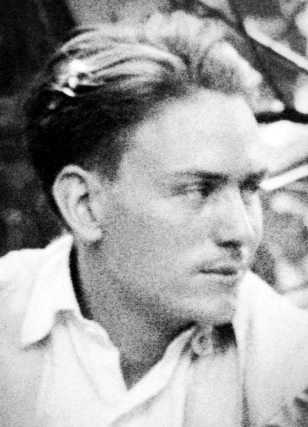
- Born: October 8, 1897; Absecon, New Jersey, U.S.
- Died: October 23, 1965 (aged 68); Atlantic City, New Jersey, U.S.
- Education: Carnegie Institute of Technology; George Washington University
- Occupation: Theatrical designer
- Works: The Emperor Jones (1920); Porgy (1928)
- Spouse(s): Kathryn "Kat" Mullin (Note: Although newspapers often spelled her name as "Katherine Mullen", she was born "Kathryn Mullin".) (m. 1922–1926) Juliet Brenon (m. 1927)
- Parents: Ernest Throckmorton (father); Roberta Cowing (mother)

Cleon Francis "Throck" Throckmorton (October 8, 1897 – October 23, 1965) was an American painter, theatrical designer, producer, and architect. During the early 1920s, Throckmorton resided in Washington, D.C., where he created sets for stage productions by Howard University, a historically black college.

While associated with Howard University, he operated the Krazy Kat speakeasy in Washington, D.C., a gathering place for artists and intellectuals. After noticing Throckmorton's set design work for Ridgely Torrence's Simon the Cyrenian at Howard University, producer George Cram Cook recruited Throckmorton to create the sets for the Provincetown Players' upcoming production of playwright Eugene O'Neill's The Emperor Jones.

Following the success of The Emperor Jones, Throckmorton became one of the most prolific set designers of the Jazz Age. His set designs were featured in over six hundred productions. During the heyday of his career, it was said that the only person whose name appeared on more playbills than Throckmorton's was the fire commissioner. He was posthumously inducted into the American Theater Hall of Fame in 2002.

== Life ==
=== Early life and education ===
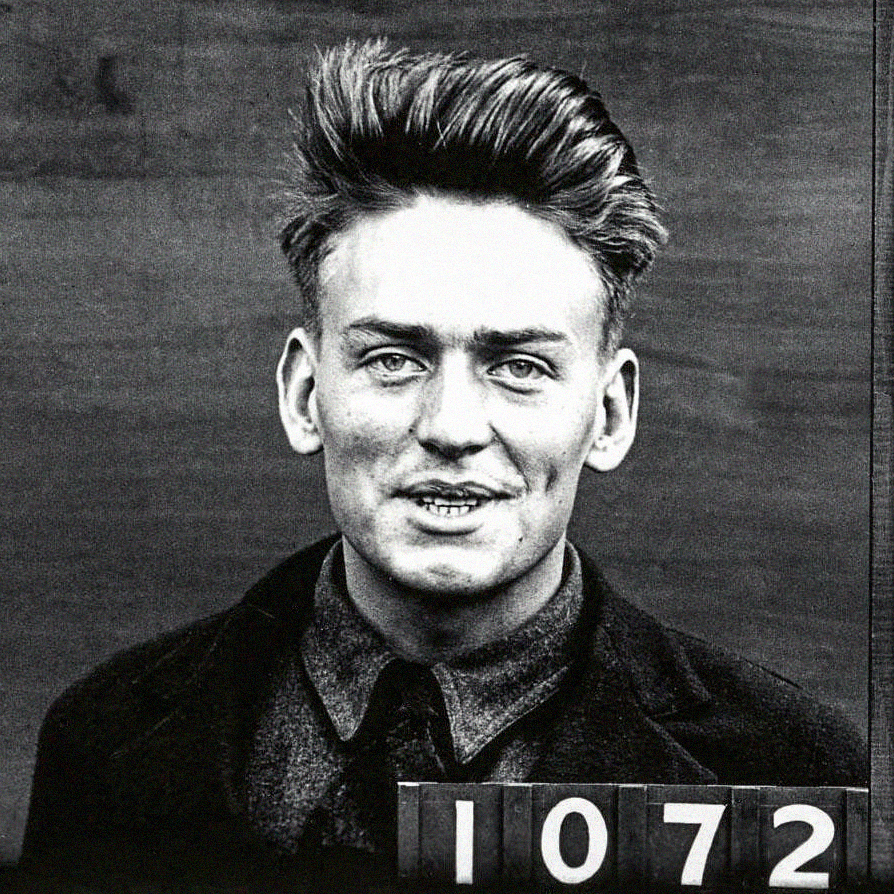
Throckmorton in 1918 civil service photo.

Born in Absecon, just outside Atlantic City, New Jersey, Throckmorton's parents Ernest Upton Throckmorton and Roberta Cowing Throckmorton had moved to Washington, D.C. by 1912 where Ernest ran a cigar store. His mother was an artist employed by the U.S. Department of Agriculture. Throckmorton's early years were spent in Atlantic City and Washington, D.C. He purportedly was deeply influenced by the gothic atmosphere of the American South which he drew upon in later years when he designed sets for All God's Chillun Got Wings (1924) and Porgy (1928).

As a young man, Throckmorton studied engineering at the Carnegie Institute of Technology from 1917 to 1918 and George Washington University from 1918 to 1919. As a student, he worked as a lab assistant at the National Institute of Standards and Technology. He developed an interest in painting, and studied painting with portraitist Charles Webster Hawthorne and Alexis Many. According to Throckmorton, his career began as a bet made with other artists in Washington, D.C. The artists claimed he could not succeed both in engineering and painting. Within a year, Throckmorton won the bet by graduating with an engineering degree and had an exposition of his paintings at the Biennial Exposition of Contemporary Artists. Attempting to reconcile his passion for painting with his love of engineering, he gradually became aware of "the perfect marriage of the two professions—set designing."

=== Early efforts and speakeasy owner ===
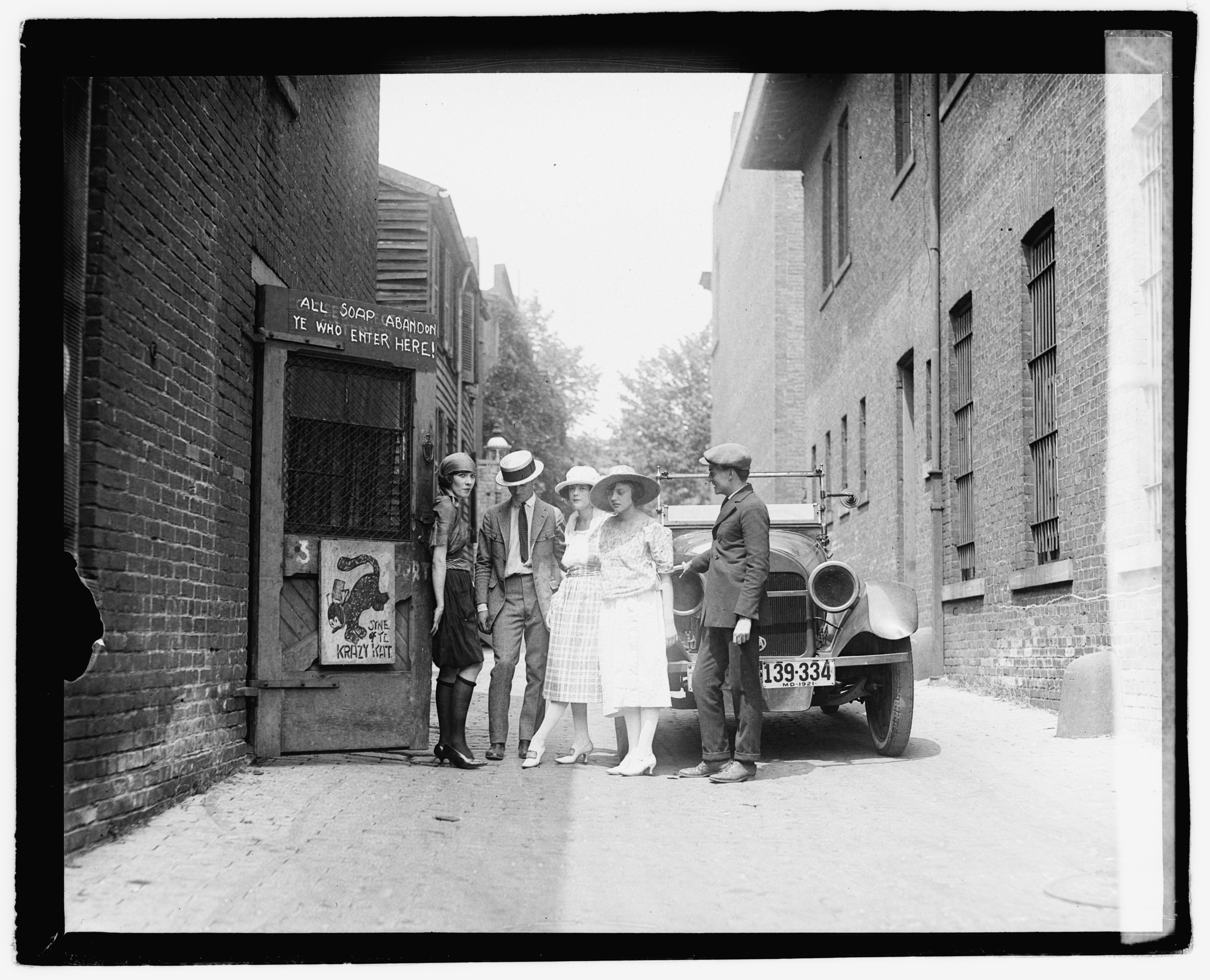
A 23-year-old Cleon Throckmorton, his 18-year-old future wife Kathryn "Kat" Mullin, and friends at the back alley entrance to the Krazy Kat in 1921.

After obtaining an engineering degree and following an exhibition of his paintings, Throckmorton began advertising himself as a specialist "in difficult tasks for the theater that require the combination of the artist and the engineer." Soon after, he became a frequent collaborator and associate with the African-American drama department at Howard University, a federally chartered historically black research university in Washington, D.C. He taught classes, produced plays, and designed sets at Howard University circa 1920–22.

While associated with Howard University, Throckmorton operated the Krazy Kat Klub, a raucous nightclub and speakeasy situated at No. 3 Green Court near Washington, D.C.'s Thomas Circle. As a pre-Raphaelite impressionist, Throckmorton believed that artists should pursue their vocation day and night by surrounding themselves with appropriate settings that inspired creativity, and the venue fulfilled that purpose.

Due to its courtyard and tree-house, the establishment became as an idyllic haunt for artists, bohemians, flappers, and other free-wheeling "young moderns" during the Jazz Age. A frequent club habitué was Kathryn Marie "Kat" Mullin, a model and sketch artist known for her radio performances as a singer and ukulele player with the Crandall Saturday Nighters. During this period, a 24-year-old Throckmorton married his model and muse 19-year-old Kathryn Mullin on January 10, 1922, in Manhattan, New York.

While operating the Krazy Kat Klub speakeasy in Washington, D.C., Throckmorton became acquainted with theater producer George Cram Cook, a key figure in the experimental theater collective known as the Provincetown Players located in Provincetown, Massachusetts. Cook had been impressed by Throckmorton's avant-garde work on Ridgely Torrence's Simon the Cyrenian at Howard University, and he offered Throckmorton the opportunity to design the sets for the upcoming first production of Eugene O'Neill's The Emperor Jones (1920). Throckmorton completed the sketches and sets in only three days, and the play opened to rave reviews on November 1, 1920.

=== Meteoric success and cultural zenith ===
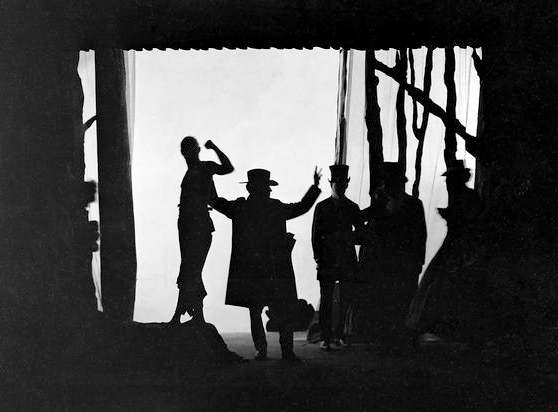
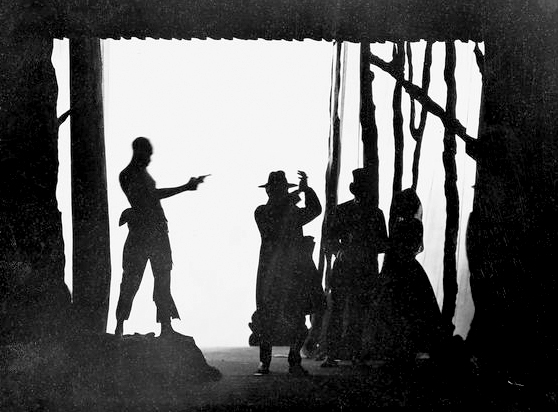
Throckmorton's lighting and set design for The Emperor Jones (1920) won him national acclaim and catapulted him into the cultural elite.

Due to the ecstatic critical reception of Throckmorton's set work for The Emperor Jones, Throckmorton went on to work on stage design or set design for over six hundred productions during the next decade. His many works included The Hairy Ape (1922), In Abraham's Bosom (1926; Pulitzer Prize, 1927), Porgy (1928), the American premiere of The Threepenny Opera (1933), Sidney Howard's Alien Corn (1933), the 1935 American premiere of Federico García Lorca's Blood Wedding (retitled as The Bitter Oleanders), and a 1942 production of Nathan the Wise. During this heyday of Throckmorton's career, it was said that the only person whose name appeared on more playbills than Throckmorton's was the fire commissioner. Many notable artists and stage designers worked with Throckmorton at the Provincetown Players, including Mordecai Gorelik, Alexander Calder, and Robert Edmond Jones.

By 1928, following his divorce from his first wife Kathryn Mullin and his second marriage to screen actress Juliet Brenon, Throckmorton had relocated to Hoboken, New Jersey, where he and his close friend, writer Christopher Morley, co-founded the Hoboken Theatrical Company. They produced at the Old Rialto Theatre a series of successful revivals of old-time melodramas from the gaslight era, "complete with peanuts—hisses for the villain and cheers for the heroes."

The efforts of Throckmorton and Morley led to a brief cultural flowering in the city. They concurrently produced an assortment of experimental crafts including an illustrated map of Hoboken, Hoboken passports, and a book, "Born in a Beer Garden, or She Troupes to Conquer" (1930), written with then-unknown poet Ogden Nash. Throckmorton and Morley later produced plays at the Millpond Playhouse in Roslyn, New York, including a well-received production of Morley's "The Trojan Horse".

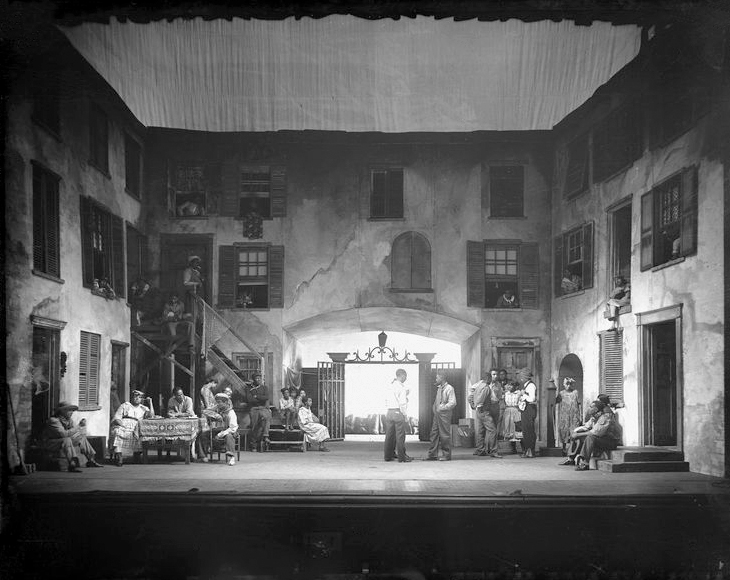
Throckmorton's set design for Catfish Row as it appeared in Porgy (1928). Seven years later, this iconic set design was re-used for George Gershwin's musical adaptation Porgy and Bess (1935).

While residing in a studio at West Third Street in New York City during the early 1930s, Throckmorton produced a series of drawings which soon decorated the "Volare" restaurant in Greenwich Village in New York City, where they have been hanging since 1933. In 1934, Throckmorton's four concept drawings for the scene designs in The Emperor Jones were included in the 1934 International Exhibition of Theatre Art at the Museum of Modern Art.

During this period, Throckmorton also became known as an architect and designer of theaters, working on the Cherry Lane Theatre in Greenwich Village, the Westport Country Playhouse in Connecticut, the Cape Playhouse at Dennis on Cape Cod, and many others. In 1935, he was awarded a Guggenheim Fellowship in Theatre Arts to study classic European theaters.

=== Decline and later years ===
After his artistic zenith during the Jazz Age, Throckmorton's theatrical work steadily declined in the 1940s, and he was forced to move on to other ventures. He became an event planner, created murals for restaurants and nightclubs, and designed private homes. He also did pioneering television work designing simulations of historical events, battles, and other events that could not be filmed. He became the first art director for the Columbia Broadcasting System (CBS) during the early years of television.

As his career declined, Throckmorton divided his time between his Greenwich Village apartment and a residence in the Bahamas. In his final years, Throckmorton lived with his second wife Juliet Brenon in semi-retirement at 33 South North Carolina Avenue in Atlantic City, New Jersey. He died at 68 years old on October 23, 1965. Nearly forty years after his death, he was posthumously inducted into the American Theater Hall of Fame in 2002.

== Marriages ==
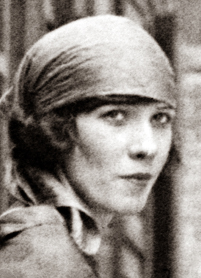
Kathryn Marie "Kat" Mullin, Throckmorton's first wife and model.

Throckmorton's first wife was Kathryn Marie "Kat" Mullin (1902–1994). A model, sketch artist and later costume designer, Mullin was a frequent habitué of Throckmorton's speakeasy known as "The Kat" in Washington, D.C., and she was known for her radio and stage performances as a singer and ukulele player with the Crandall Saturday Nighters. For her stage performances, she was billed as "The Girl With the Million Dollar Legs." When not performing, she was a renowned expert in women's saber fencing and gave public exhibitions.

After four years of marriage, Kathryn sued Cleon for divorce on December 17, 1926, after catching him in an extramarital affair with an unidentified woman—possibly silent movie actress Juliet Brenon—in their Greenwich Village apartment in New York City. Kathryn's friend, African-American stage actress Blanche Dunn, served as a witness on her behalf in the divorce suit. Cleon did not contest the divorce, and Kathryn did not seek alimony. After her uncontested divorce from Throckmorton, Kathryn married New York Daily News political journalist John Parsons O'Donnell on May 6, 1927, in a civil ceremony, but they divorced shortly thereafter in 1929.

Juliet Brenon and Percy Marmont in The Street of Forgotten Men (1925)

Immediately after his divorce from Kathryn Mullin, Throckmorton married his second wife, silent movie actress Juliet Brenon (1895–1979) on March 13, 1927. The Brenons were a musical and theatrical family; her father Algernon had been a music critic, and her uncle Herbert Brenon was a prolific film director who directed the first cinematic adaptation of The Great Gatsby in 1926. Juliet's sister Aileen (1894–1967) was a music critic and theatrical publicist whose husband was art critic Thomas Craven.

During the 1930s, Throckmorton's and Brenon's Greenwich Village apartment became an after-hours salon for thespians, artists, and intellectuals such as Noël Coward, Norman Bel Geddes, Eugene O'Neill, and E.E. Cummings. Their politically leftward salon notably raised funds for the Republican faction during the Spanish Civil War.

== See also ==
- Krazy Kat Klub
