= Roberta Cowing =

American scientific illustrator and artist

Roberta Cowing Throckmorton (October 1860 - July 31, 1924) was an American artist, employed by the U.S. Department of Agriculture (USDA).

== Early life ==
Roberta Cowing was born to William Jackson Cowing (1832–1893) and Matilda Helen Crupper Cowing (1837–1896) in October of 1860, in Rushville, Rush County, Indiana, USA. She had one older brother, Frank Myrtle Cowing (1857–1894).

== Career ==
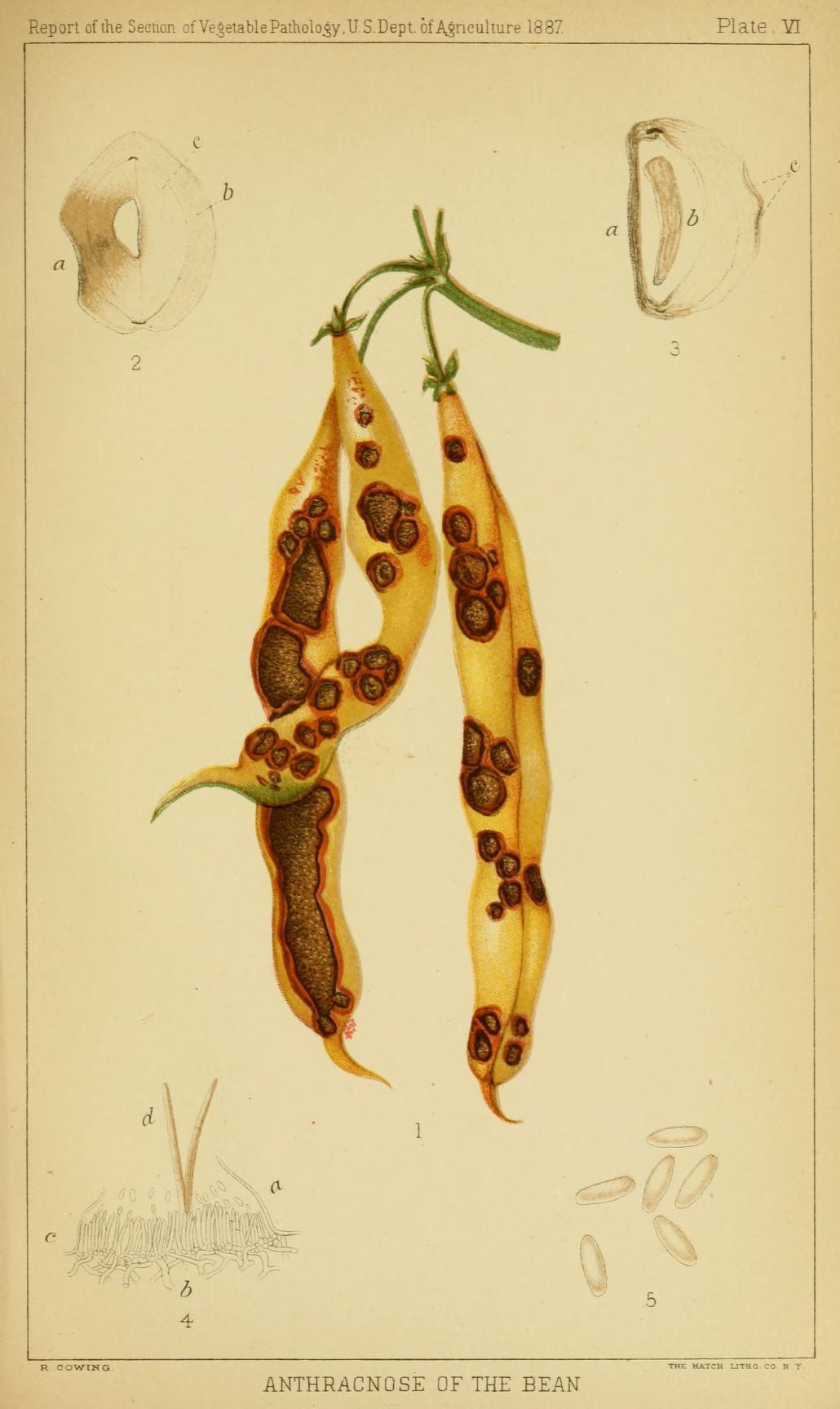
Anthracnose of the bean by Roberta Cowing

Cowing was employed by the U.S. Department of Agriculture (USDA) in the nineteenth and twentieth centuries to paint watercolors of fruit and nut varieties, as part of the USDA's Pomological Watercolor Collection. The collection includes paintings of Prunus salicina (Japanese plum), Pyrus communis (pears), and Rubus (brambles).

She made illustrations of plants collected in an 1891 botanical survey of Death Valley; the work was published in an educational journal.

Collections from the U.S. National Herbarium published twenty-one drawings of plants collected in Death Valley in their November 1893 issue, seventeen of which were signed by Roberta Cowing.

Today, Cowing's work can be found in Carnegie Mellon University's Catalogue of the Botanical Art Collection at the Hunt Institute: Public Domain Images, as well as in several USDA government publications:

- Bulletin No. 1-29, U.S. Government Printing Office, 1888
- Peach Yellows: A Preliminary Report, Department of Agriculture, Botanical Division, 1888
- Bulletin, U.S. Government Printing Office, 1888
- Yearbook of Agriculture, U.S. Government Printing Office, 1889

Cowing was active in Washington, D.C. from 1887 to 1920.

She resided at 1311 13th Street N.W. Washington, D.C.

== Personal life ==
Roberta Cowing married Ernest Throckmorton at her parents' residence, on December 27, 1892. Together, they had two sons, Robert W Throckmorton (1893–1952) and set designer Cleon Francis Throckmorton (1897–1965).

== Death ==
Roberta Cowing Throckmorton died at the age of 63, at George Washington University Hospital, on July 31, 1924, and she was buried in Rock Creek Cemetery in Washington, D.C.
