= Provincetown Players =

Artist collective in the United States

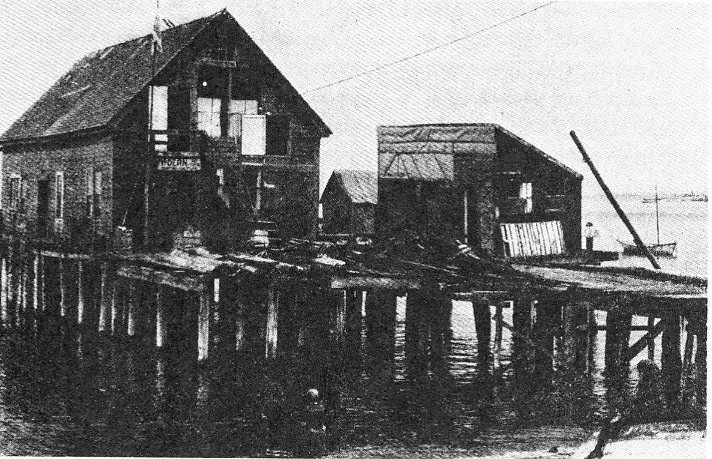
- Lewis Wharf, first home of the Provincetown Players in 1915
- Formation: 1915
- Dissolved: 1922
- Type: Theatre group
- Purpose: amateur productions of new, experimental theatre
- Location(s): Provincetown, Massachusetts, on Cape Cod; New York City

The Provincetown Players was an American collective of artists, people and writers, intellectuals, and amateur theater enthusiasts active between 1915 and 1922. Under the leadership of the husband and wife team of George Cram “Jig” Cook and Susan Glaspell from Iowa, the Players produced two seasons in Provincetown, Massachusetts (1915 and 1916) and six seasons in New York City, between 1916 and 1922. The company's founding has been called "the most important innovative moment in American theatre." Its productions helped launch the careers of Eugene O'Neill and Susan Glaspell, and ushered American theatre into the Modern era.

== Founding in Provincetown ==
The Provincetown Players began in July 1915. Provincetown, Massachusetts, had become a popular summer outpost for numerous artists and writers, bohemian residents from Greenwich Village, New York. On July 22 a group of friends who were disillusioned by the commercialism of Broadway created an evening's entertainment by staging two one-act plays. Constancy by Neith Boyce and Suppressed Desires by Susan Glaspell and George Cram Cook were performed at the home of Hutchins Hapgood and Neith Boyce.

The evening was a success and an additional performance was organized. Mary Heaton Vorse donated the use of the fish house on Lewis Wharf, where a makeshift stage was assembled. The two one-acts which had been presented at the Hapgood home were restaged in August, and a second bill of two new plays was presented in September: Change Your Style by George Cram Cook and Contemporaries by Wilbur Daniel Steele. They were excited about their "creative collective".

Enthusiasm for the theatrical experiment in Provincetown continued over the winter of 1915–16 and the group planned a second season at Lewis Wharf. The plays were funded in part by a subscription campaign in which Cook described the aim of the group: “to give American playwrights a chance to work out their ideas in freedom."

The second season introduced Eugene O’Neill and his play Bound East for Cardiff as well as Trifles by Susan Glaspell.

== New York City ==
In September 1916 before leaving Massachusetts, the group met and, led by Cook and John Reed, formally organized "The Provincetown Players," voting to produce a season in New York City. Jig Cook was elected president of the newly constituted organization. The Players were founded to “establish a stage where playwrights of sincere, poetic, literary and dramatic purpose could see their plays in action and superintend their production without submitting to the commercial managers' interpretation of public taste.”

On September 19, 1916, Cook turned the first floor parlor of an apartment at 139 Macdougal Street, an 1840 brownstone row house, into a theatre, which the Players dubbed “The Playwright’s Theater.”

The Players developed a pattern of producing a "bill" of three new one-act plays every two weeks over a 21-week season.

The first New York season in 1916–17 presented nine “bills” between November and March, including three new O’Neill plays, which included a revival of Bound East for Cardiff. Other plays were by Neith Boyce, Susan Glaspell, Floyd Dell, Rita Wellman and Harry Kemp. A significant addition to the Players was director Nina Moise, a trained actor and young director who began helping the Players with their staging and interpretation of plays in 1917.

In the 1917–18 season Edna St. Vincent Millay and her sister Norma joined the Players as actors. The season featured three new plays by O'Neill, three by Glaspell, and their first full-length play, The Athenian Women, written by George Cram Cook.

In the 1918–19 season The Players moved to 133 Macdougal Street and called the theater "The Provincetown Playhouse". The 1918–1919 season included The Princess Marries the Page by Edna St. Vincent Millay.

The Players was founded as an amateur group, and initially did not allow critics to attend to review its plays, hoping to protect its experimental nature. But during their first New York season, some members began voice their desire to see their work toward becoming professional actors. Finally they voted to allow critics tickets to performances, even though some founding members considered this means of evaluation to be the criteria of commercial theater, and therefore a violation of the mission of The Players. At the end of the third New York season, Cook and Glaspell decided to step away from the Players for a year-long sabbatical (1919–20). During the sabbatical the theater's day-to-day management was overseen by business manager Mary Eleanor Fitzgerald, known to all as "Fitzi," and James Light.

The 1919–20 season ("The Season of Youth") included three plays by Djuna Barnes, two by Eugene O’Neill, Aria Da Capo by Edna St. Vincent Millay, and Three Travelers Watch a Sunrise by Wallace Stevens.

== Success and change ==
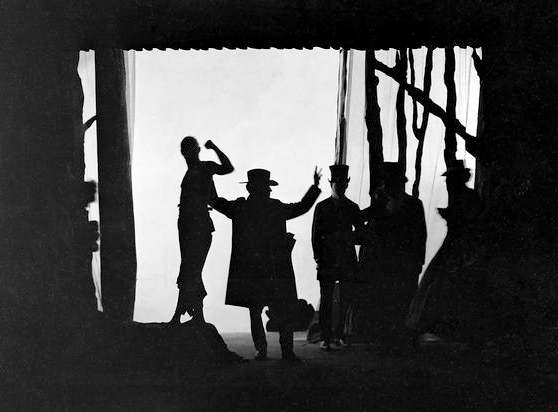
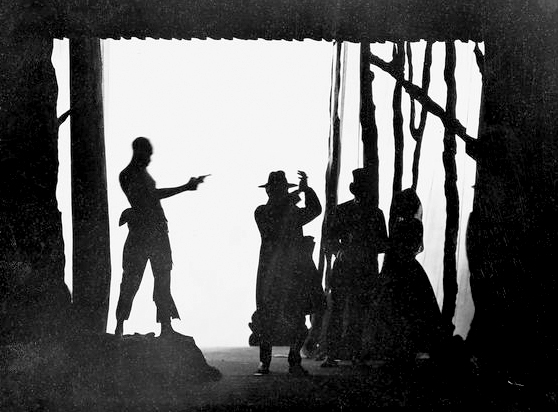
Scenes from Eugene O'Neill's play, The Emperor Jones, produced by the Provincetown Players in January 1921. Cleon Throckmorton designed the set.

Eugene O'Neill's The Emperor Jones opened the 1920–21 season and was an overnight hit. The cast was led by Charles Gilpin, who was the first African-American professional actor to perform with a primarily white company in the United States. Alexander Woollcott in The New York Times said that The Emperor Jones was an "extraordinarily striking and dramatic study of panic fear.” O’Neill's play “reinforces the impression that for strength and originality he has no rival among American writers for the stage.”

Cook used the production of The Emperor Jones to advocate for a striking scenic innovation, spending over 500 dollars on the set alone – the construction of a dome in the Playhouse modeled on the scenic element used in art theaters in Europe. The dome (kuppelhorizont) used a “combination of vertical and horizontal curvatures” as a reflective surface to represent the horizon and create a greater sense of depth than a flat cyclorama. The Emperor Jones ran for 200 performances.

After the attention The Emperor Jones received, along with a Broadway transfer of the play, some members of the Players began to see their highest goal as gaining commercial and critical success. The mission of the Players became more clouded when subsequent plays were transferred to Broadway, though less successfully, and the drain of casting multiple productions as well as continuing their work on Macdougal street drained them.

Commercial success eroded the collective spirit of experimentation on which the Provincetown Players had been formed. As a result of the growing pressure to succeed in commercial terms, and with no new playwrights coming to them to be developed, Cook and Glaspell asked to incorporate the "Provincetown Players" so as to protect the name. They left in 1922 to travel to Greece after O'Neill fired Cook as the director of his play The Hairy Ape and they felt he was using the Players as a try-out for its Broadway run without apology. James Light succeeded Cook as director of the play, and took over the leadership of the Provincetown Players.

Though the 1921–22 season finished without the public knowing that Cook and Glaspell had left, the Players announced a suspension of their 1922–23 season. Though Cook wrote his subscribers promising a season beginning in October 1923, he and Glaspell remained in Greece, and the original Provincetown Players did not produce again.

In 1923 the primary members of the Provincetown Players’ corporation voted to formally disband. Jig Cook had already written to the company, before he left in 1922, that they had given “the theater they had loved a good death.”

== Continuing the name ==
After the formal dissolution of the Players, several associates sought to create a producing organization that would carry on their success and use the Players' name. When Jig Cook died in Greece January 1924, Susan Glaspell could not prevent creation of a new producing organization, but she fought to protect the name "The Provincetown Players" from the new partnership.

In January 1924, the new group premiered The Spook Sonata (a translation of August Strindberg’s Ghost Sonata). It marked a new phase in the life of the company that was still identified in the popular imagination as the Provincetown Players. A triumvirate of Robert Edmond Jones, Kenneth Macgowan, and Eugene O’Neill directed the organization; it operated as “The Experimental Theatre, Inc.” and produced in the “Provincetown Playhouse.”

The Provincetown operated under the triumvirate for two seasons. But Macgowan allowed that “the Provincetown Players of the great days. . . ended when Jig Cook went to Greece and Eugene O’Neill went to Broadway.” The triumvirate dissolved after two years.

The “Third Provincetown” operated from 1925–1929. The theater continued to wrestle with the tension between process and product. The original Provincetown Players were founded on ideals of simplicity, experimentation, and group process. Success, on the other hand, relied on finished products and expansion. The Fall 1929 stock market crash abruptly added to the theater's burdens. After the final performance of Winter Bound by Thomas H. Dickinson on December 14, 1929, the theater company closed for good. Helen Deutsch began managing the company in 1927 while a senior at Barnard College, until its closure, then writing a book about it.

== Role of women in the Provincetown Players ==
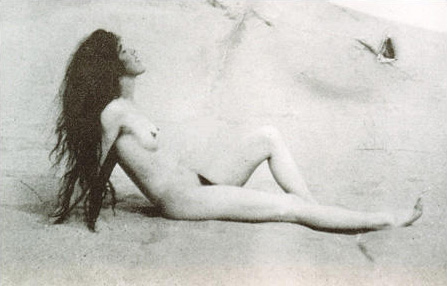
Feminist playwright Louise Bryant sunbathing in Provincetown, 1916

Women were a prominent part of the Provincetown Players. Susan Glaspell and Jig Cook were partners in organizing the Players. Neith Boyce and Glaspell (who co-wrote a play with her husband Cook) wrote the first two plays performed by the Players. Mary Heaton Vorse donated the use of the fish house on Lewis Wharf as the Players' first home for two summers in Provincetown.

Similarly, the Players gave voice to women artists. Of the forty-seven playwrights whose work was produced by the Provincetown Players, seventeen were women. Prominent among these playwrights were Glaspell (who later won a Pulitzer Prize for drama in 1931 for her play, Alison's House); Boyce, Djuna Barnes, Louise Bryant, Rita Wellman, Mary Carolyn Davies, and Edna St. Vincent Millay. The later famous speech coach Edith Skinner worked with the company around 1930.

In addition to challenging the artistic status quo of Broadway, the Provincetown Players gave opportunities to women and challenged the sexual segregation of commercial theater.

== Little Theatre movement ==
The Little Theatre Movement in America came about in reaction to the tepid entertainment offered by the commercial theater. In an effort to appeal to a mass audience, Broadway took few chances with untested plays and playwrights. The Little Theatres provided an outlet for American playwrights, and stories of social significance. They were predominantly performed in a social realist style.

== The Players and Greenwich Village ==
The anti-commercial impulse, emphasis on artistic expression, and collective decision-making of the Provincetown Players were manifestations of the bohemian spirit of Greenwich Village of the 1910s. The Players were founded from a network of friendships among artists, intellectuals and radicals. Mabel Dodge, who hosted the most celebrated literary salon of the period, was the former lover of founding member of the Players Jack Reed (actor). Their love affair was the thinly disguised subject matter of the first Players production, Constancy. Max Eastman, editor of the radical magazine The Masses, also participated early on with the Players; his wife at the time, Ida Rauh, became one of their most important actresses, whose work with the Players continued after their split in early 1917. The first New York theater for the Provincetown Players was at 139 Macdougal Street, two doors down from the Liberal Club at 135 Macdougal, a gathering place for young radicals.

== Artists affiliated with the Provincetown Players ==
Djuna Barnes, Theodore Dreiser, Susan Glaspell, Robert Edmond Jones, James Light, Edna St. Vincent Millay, Eugene O’Neill, John Reed, Wallace Stevens, Marjory Lacey-Barker, Cleon Throckmorton, and Charles Demuth.

== Gallery ==
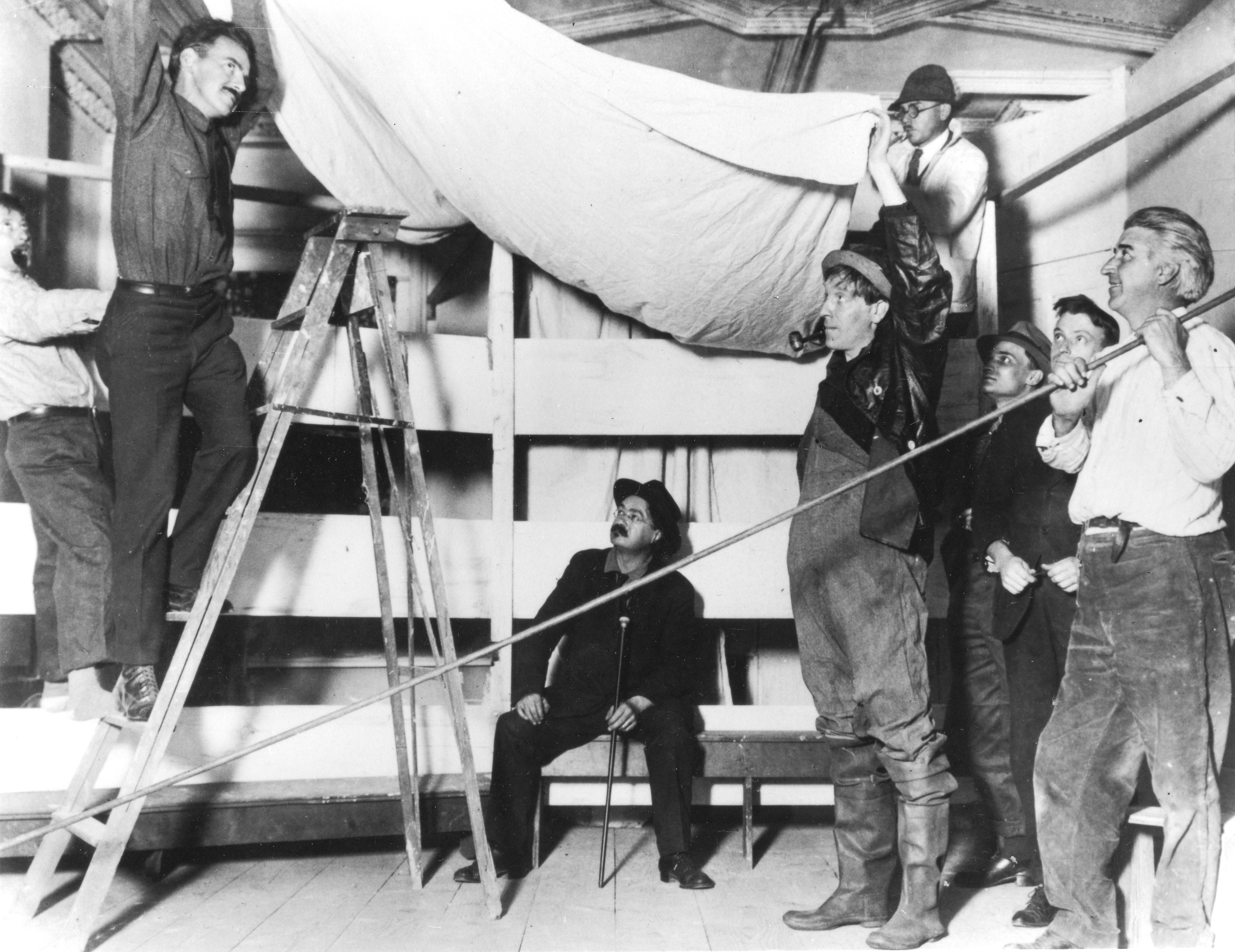
Setting up the stage for Bound East for Cardiff, Fall 1916. Photo shows O'Neill on the ladder, Cook to the far right.

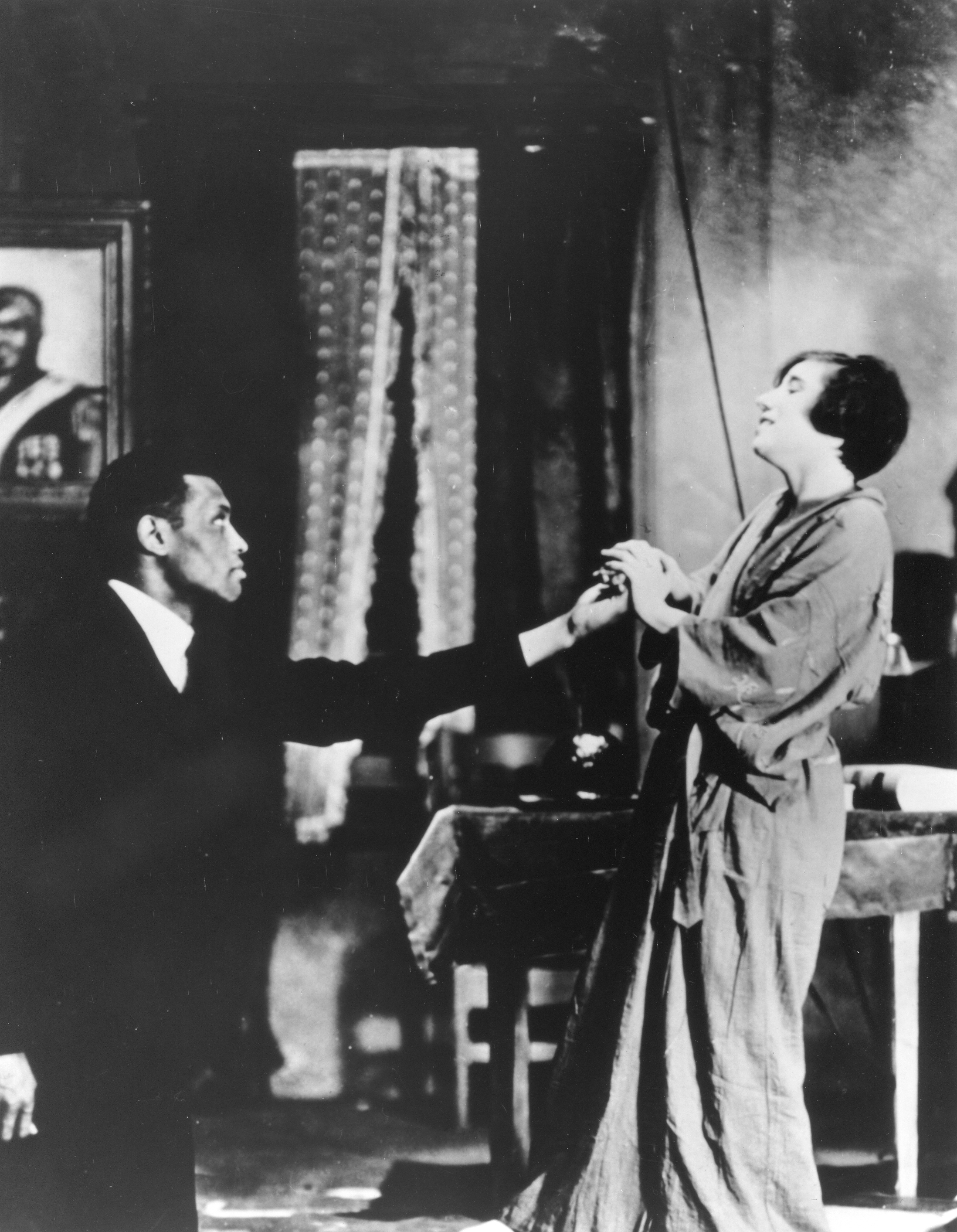
Scene in All God's Chillun Got Wings in which Paul Robeson kissed Mary Blair's hand, attracting national interest.

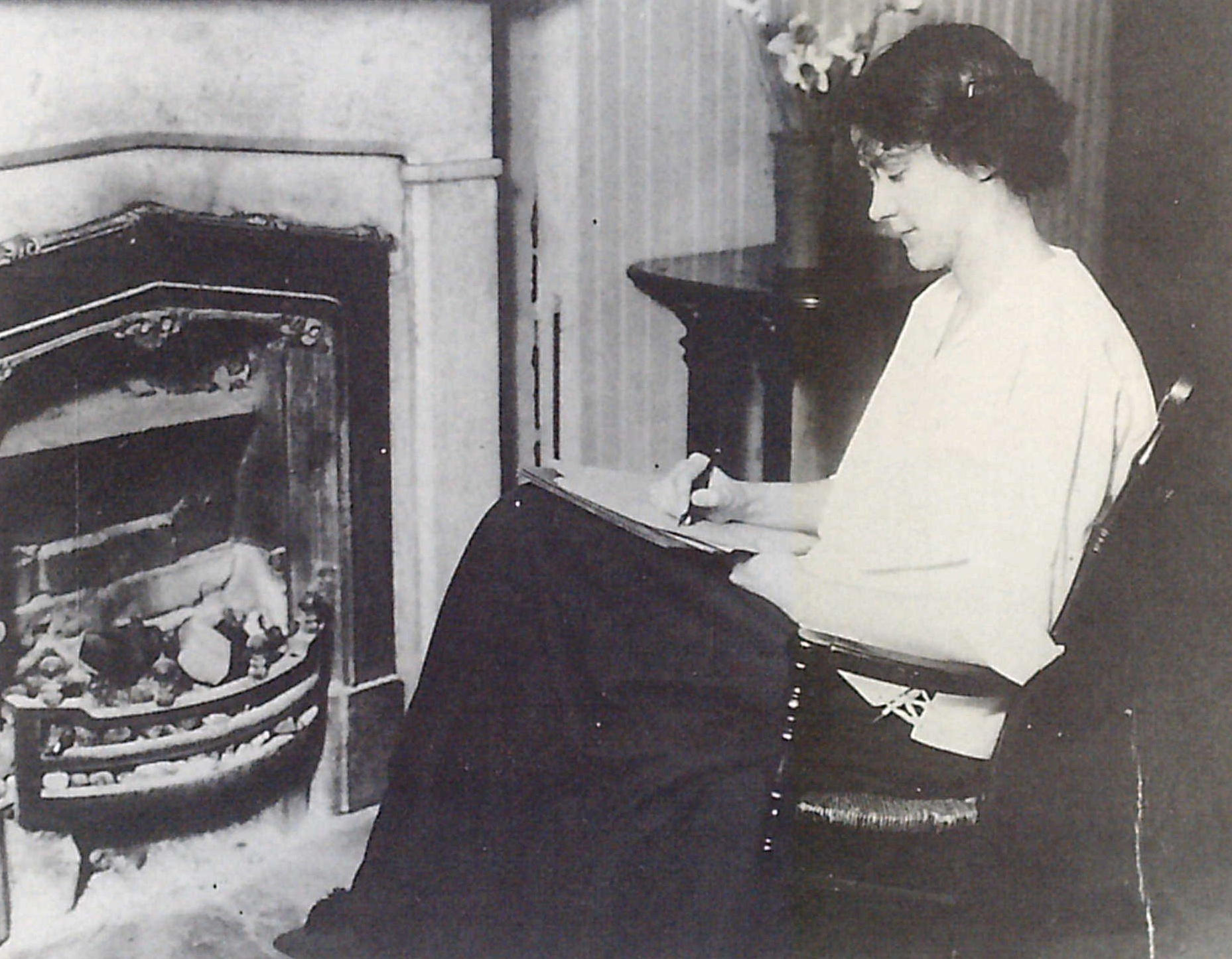
Susan Glaspell, playwright and one of the founders of the Provincetown Players.

== See also ==
- Provincetown Playhouse, their Manhattan venue
- Eugene O'Neill and the Provincetown Players
