= Nancy Price =

English actress, author and theatre director (1880–1970)

Nancy Price CBE
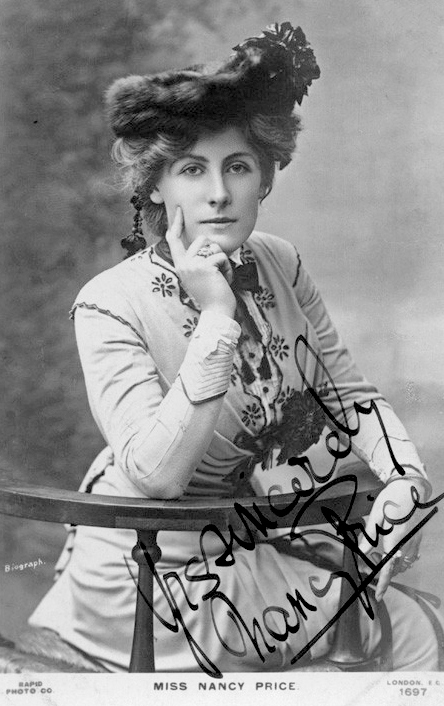
- Born: Lilian Nancy Bache Price; 3 February 1880; Kinver, Staffordshire, England
- Died: 31 March 1970 (aged 90); Worthing, Sussex, England
- Occupations: Actress; author; theatre director; theatre founder
- Spouse: Charles Maude (m. 1907; died 1943)

Nancy Price (3 February 1880 – 31 March 1970) was an English actress on stage and screen, author, animal welfare activist and theatre director. Her acting career began in a repertory theatre company before progressing to the London stage, silent films, talkies and finally television. In addition to appearing on stage she became involved in theatre production and was a founder of the People's National Theatre.

== Personal life ==
Christened Lilian Nancy Bache Price in Kinver, Staffordshire, England, in 1880, Nancy was the daughter of William Henry Price (a retired farmer) and Sarah Mannix. Her mother was the granddaughter of Sir Henry Mannix. After schooling in her home village and then in nearby Malvern Wells she decided at an early age to become an actress. She married the actor Charles Maude on 17 May 1907, and they were together until his death in 1943. They had two daughters Joan Maude and Elizabeth Maude. Joan, Elizabeth, and Elizabeth's daughter Jennifer Phipps all went on to become actresses. Soon after Charles and Nancy's daughters were born, they made the village of Findon in Sussex her home, living in a cottage called "Arcana" in Heather Lane on the Downs.

She wrote many books, including her autobiography, Into an Hour-Glass (1953). At one time she managed the "Little Theatre" in the Adelphi, off the Strand.

Findon remained her home until her death in 1970.

== Animal welfare ==
Price was an advocate of animal welfare and co-founded the Council of Justice to Animals in 1911. Price became a vegetarian in the 1920s after an experience at a walking tour in the fens. She became lost in a fog and credited the local sheep as saving her life by offering her protection and keeping her warm. Price was president of the Sussex Vegetarian Society and lectured on vegetarianism in Worthing. In 1951, at a vegetarian public meeting she argued that more people would turn to vegetarianism if they visited a slaughterhouse. She suggested that vegetarian restaurants should be publicized more.

In 1937, Price denounced the use of gin traps on rabbits as "barbarous cruelty" and a "savage instrument of torture". Price authored a book on dogs, Tails and Tales, published in 1945. The anthology is made up of facts about dogs taken from many sources. In 1949, she funded the creation of a "Warrior Birds" memorial stone at Beach House Park to commemorate war pigeons who gave their lives in service during World War II.

Price was concerned about rabbits suffering from myxomatosis. In 1954, Price supported a petition urging the Government to pass a new law making deliberate spreading of myxomatosis an offence. The petition gained support from the RSPCA and animal lovers in Worthing. In 1963, Price campaigned against the careless ringing of young birds by ornithologists. She commented that the metal often damaged the legs of small birds and suggested legislation to prevent unqualified people from bird ringing. She was an opponent of blood sports and attended meetings of the League Against Cruel Sports Worthing branch.

Price was an anti-vivisectionist. She was a speaker at the annual meeting of the National Anti-Vivisection Society in 1939. She was president of the Richmond and Twickenham branch of the British Union for the Abolition of Vivisection (BUAV) in 1944. Price was president of the Storrington and district branch of the BUAV in 1954. She stated that "if people could see inside a vivisector's chamber and see what was going on they would be horrified".

== Theatre career ==
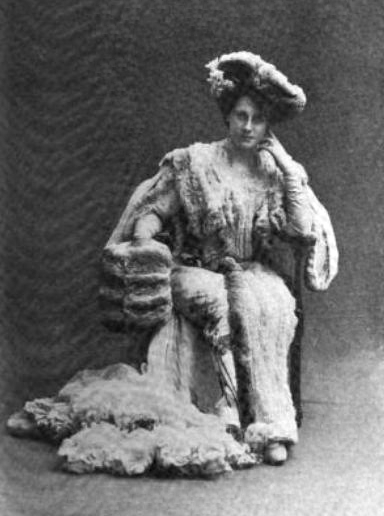
As Princess Bellini in The Eternal City in 1902

Nancy joined F. R. Benson's theatre company whilst still at school. The company specialised in Shakespeare's plays and toured extensively in the provinces. Her first big break came when she caught the attention of Sir Herbert Beerbohm Tree, who cast her as Calypso in Stephen Phillips's production of Ulysses at Her Majesty's Theatre, London in 1902, a role in which she enjoyed great success. The part of Hilda Gunning was written for her by Arthur Wing Pinero in Letty (1904), a role in which the theatre critic J. T. Grein said: "In Letty, while others enhanced their fame, Miss Nancy Price, in the part of Hilda, the shop-girl, made her name. If we read the character aright, Miss Price realised it well-nigh to perfection". In 1909 she appeared as Mrs. D'Aquila in George Dance's production of The Whip at the Theatre Royal, Drury Lane. She joined Edith Craig's Pioneer Players at the Kingsway Theatre in 1911 for a performance of Christopher St. John's The First Actress. In March 1912, she appeared as India in Sir Edward Elgar's Imperial Masque The Crown of India at the London Coliseum.

Together with the Dutch-born theatre impresario J. T. Grein, Nancy Price founded the People's National Theatre in 1930. Their first production was The Man from Blankleys by F. Anstey at the Fortune Theatre. When Grein left the company Nancy became its honorary director, and in 1932 a permanent home was found at the Little Theatre in the Adelphi with Nancy as manager. The enterprise came to an end with the destruction of the theatre in 1941. During this period, Nancy established the English School Theatre Movement, which toured productions of Shakespeare plays to working class children.

In the 1950 King's Birthday Honours, Nancy was awarded a CBE for services to the stage. In the same year, she gave her final stage performance as Martha Blanchard in the play she co-wrote with Eden Phillpotts, The Orange Orchard, at the New Lindsey Theatre.

== Theatre performances ==
Theatre
Season	Play Title	Theatre	Role	Notes
1900	Pericles	Shakespeare Memorial Theatre, Stratford-upon-Avon	Diana	
1900	Macbeth	Shakespeare Memorial Theatre, Stratford-upon-Avon	Hecate	
1902	Ulysses	Her Majesty's Theatre, London	Calypso	Written by Stephen Phillips, produced by Beerbohm Tree
1902–03	The Eternal City	His Majesty's Theatre, London	Princess Bellini	Dramatisation of Hall Caine's novel of the same name
1903	Em'ly	Adelphi Theatre, London	Rosa Dartle	
1903	A Snug Little Kingdom	Royalty Theatre, London	Sister Hope	
1903	The Two Mr. Wetherbys	Imperial Theatre, London	Constantia	Stage Society production of St. John Hankin's first play
1903–04	Letty	Duke of York's Theatre, London	Hilda Gunning	
1908	The Gay Lord Quex	Garrick Theatre, London	Sophy Fullgarney	
1908–09	A Modern Aspasia	The Aldwych Theatre, London	Muriel Meredith	Play by Hamilton Fyfe, cast included her husband Charles Maude
1909	One of the Best	The Aldwych Theatre, London	Esther Coventry	Play by Seymour Hicks
1909	The Fountain	The Aldwych Theatre, London	Dinah Kippin	Play by George Calderon
1909–10	The Whip	Theatre Royal, Drury Lane, London	Mrs. D'Aquila	
1911	The Vision of Delight	His Majesty's Theatre, London	One of The Twelve Hours	Play written by Ben Jonson Coronation Gala performance
1911	The First Actress	The Kingsway Theatre, London	Margaret Hughes	
1911	The Merchant of Venice	Shakespeare Memorial Theatre, Stratford-upon-Avon	Portia	
1915–16	Richard III	His Majesty's Theatre, London		
1923	Outward Bound	Everyman Theatre, London	Mrs. Cliveden-Banks	Play by Sutton Vane
1923–24	Ambush	Garrick Theatre, London	Harriett Nichols	
1925	Enrico IV (Henry IV)	Everyman Theatre, London	Marchioness Matilda Spina	Play written by Luigi Pirandello
1925	And That's the Truth (If You Think it is)	Lyric Theatre, Hammersmith, London	Signora Frola	Based on the play Così è (se vi pare) by Luigi Pirandello
1925	Gloriana	Little Theatre in the Adelphi, London	Princess Elizabeth	Appearing alongside John Gielgud
1929–30	Belle: or What's the Bother?	Prince Of Wales Theatre, London	Annie Collins	Later renamed as Down Our Street
1931	The Silver Box	Fortune Theatre, London	Mrs. Jones	Play written by John Galsworthy
1931	Salome	Savoy Theatre, London	Herodias	First public performance in England of Oscar Wilde's previously banned play
1932	Trifles	Duchess Theatre, London	Mrs. Hale	Play written by Susan Glaspell
1932	Alison's House	Little Theatre in the Adelphi, London	Miss Agatha	Pulitzer Prize winning play written by Susan Glaspell
1934	Nurse Cavell	Vaudeville Theatre, London	Edith Cavell	Play written by C. E. Bechhofer Roberts and C.S. Forester
1934	The Life That I Gave Him	People's National Theatre	Don'Anna Luna	Play written by Luigi Pirandello (Italian source: La vita che ti diedi, 1923)
1939	Mrs Van Kleek	Playhouse Theatre, London	Mrs Van Kleek, the lead	Play written by Elinor Mordaunt from her book of the same name published 1933 ran 10 March to 15 April 1939 Queen Mary attended Friday 14 April 1939 [The Times 18 March 1939]
1941–42	Whiteoaks	Theatre Royal, Bath and Comedy Theatre, London		
1943	Vintage Wine	Grand Theatre, Blackpool	Madame Popinot	
1943–44	John Gabriel Borkman	The Playhouse Theatre, Liverpool		
1944–45	Lisa	The Playhouse Theatre, Liverpool		
1950	The Orange Orchard	New Lindsey Theatre, London	Martha Blanchard	

== Film career ==
Having established herself as a stage actress in London's West End, Nancy's first film role was in the black and white, silent film The Lyons Mail. In the next decade she appeared in a further eight silent films before her first "talkie", The American Prisoner, which was recorded in mono sound in 1929. The last silent film in which she appeared The Price of Divorce was adapted by producer Oswald Mitchell to incorporate sound and released under the name Such is the Law.

== Filmography ==
Film
Year	Title	Role	Notes
1916	The Lyons Mail	Janette	
1921	Belphegor the Mountebank	Countess de Blangy	
1923	Bonnie Prince Charlie	Lady Kingsburgh	Appearing alongside Ivor Novello
1923	The Woman Who Obeyed	Governess	
1923	Comin' Thro' the Rye	Mrs. Titmouse	
1923	Love, Life and Laughter	Balloon blowers wife's friend	
1927	Huntingtower	Mrs. Moran	Based on novel by John Buchan
1928	His House in Order	Lady Ridgeley	Silent film which is believed lost.
1928	The Price of Divorce		released as Such is the Law
1929	The American Prisoner	Lovey Lee	
1930	The Loves of Robert Burns	Posie Nancy	
1930	Such Is the Law	Aunt	
1931	The Speckled Band	Mrs. Staunton	Early Sherlock Holmes film
1932	Down Our Street	Annie Collins	
1934	The Crucifix	Miss Bryany	
1939	The Stars Look Down	Martha Fenwick	Adapted by A.J.Cronin
1940	Dead Man's Shoes	Madame Pelletier	Roddy McDowell in an early role
1942	Secret Mission	Violette, housekeeper	
1944	Madonna of the Seven Moons	Mama Barucci	Produced by Gainsborough Pictures
1945	I Know Where I'm Going!	Mrs. Crozier	Petula Clark in an early role
1945	I Live in Grosvenor Square	Mrs. Wilson	
1946	Carnival	Mrs. Trewhella	
1947	Master of Bankdam	Lydia Crowther	Nicholas Parsons in a minor role
1948	The Three Weird Sisters	Gertrude Morgan-Vaughan	Screenplay co-written by Dylan Thomas
1950	The Naked Heart	Theresa Suprenant	Film also known as Maria Chapdelaine
1952	Mandy	Jane Ellis	Distributed by Ealing Studios

== Television filmography ==
Television
Year	Title	Role	Notes
1938	Will Shakespeare	Queen Elizabeth	BBC production
1948	Nurse Cavell	Edith Cavell	BBC production
1949	Down Our Street	Annie Collins	BBC production
1950	The Silver Box	Mrs.Jones	BBC production based on a play by John Galsworthy
1950	Thérèse Raquin	Madame Raquin	BBC production based on novel Thérèse Raquin by Émile Zola
1950	The Orange Orchard	Martha Blanchard	BBC production
1951	Whiteoaks	Grandma Adeline Whiteoak	BBC production

== Radio broadcasting ==
Year	Title	Role	Notes
1951	The Life That I Gave Him	Donn'Anna Luna	BBC production. From the play La vita che ti diedi, 1923, by Luigi Pirandello. Translated by Clifford Bax. Adapted for broadcasting and produced by Mary Hope Allen

== Bibliography ==
=== Plays ===
- Whiteoaks: A Play (With Mazo de la Roche, Macmillan, 1936)
- The Orange Orchard (With Eden Phillpotts, London: Samuel French, 1950)

=== Poetry ===
- Hurdy-Gurdy (London : Frederick Muller, 1944)

=== Novels ===
- Ta-mera (London : Hutchinson & Co., 1950)

=== Essays, memoirs and diaries ===
- Behind the Night-Light: the by-world of a child of three. Described by Joan Maude and faithfully recorded by Nancy Price (London : John Murray, 1912)
- Vagabond's Way. Haphazard wanderings on the fells ... With illustrations by A.S. Hartrick (London : John Murray, 1914)
- Shadows on the Hills, etc. On the English Lake District. With plates (London : Victor Gollancz, 1935)
- The Gull's Way. An account of a cruise along the East Coast of England (London : Victor Gollancz, 1937)
- Nettles and Docks, etc. Essays (London : G. Allen & Unwin, 1940)
- Jack by the Hedge, etc. Sketches of country life (London : Frederick Muller, 1942)
- I had a Comrade "Buddy" On the author's dog (London : G. Allen & Unwin, 1944)
- Tails and Tales. On dogs (London : Victor Gollancz, 1945)
- Where the Skies Unfold, etc. Essays (Birmingham : George Ronald, 1947)
- Wonder of Wings. A book about birds (London : Victor Gollancz, 1947)
- Acquainted with the Night. A book of dreams (Illustrated by Michael Rothenstein, Oxford : George Ronald, 1949)
- Bright Pinions. On parrots (Oxford : George Ronald, 1952)
- Feathered Outlaws (London & Worthing : Henry E. Walter, 1953)
- In Praise of Trees. An anthology for friends (London : Frederick Muller, 1953)
- Into an Hour-Glass. An autobiography (London : Museum Press, 1953)
- Pagan's Progress. High days and holy days (London : Museum Press, 1954)
- The Heart of a Vagabond. On country life in Sussex (London : Museum Press, 1955)
- I watch and listen. A book mainly concerned with the courtship and song of birds (London : Bodley Head, 1957)
- Winged Builders. A book of bird lore, chiefly concerned with the nesting, building and family habits of British birds (London : George Ronald, 1959)
- Each in his own way! Personalities I have valued, selected from my album of memories ... Woodcuts by William Wood (London : Frederick Muller, 1960)
