= Alfred Hitchcock Presents season 7 =

Alfred Hitchcock Presents aired 39 episodes during its seventh season from 1961 to 1962. One episode, "The Sorcerer's Apprentice", was not aired in its network run.

== Episodes ==
No. overall	No. in season	Title	Directed by	Written by	Stars	Original release date
230	1	"The Hatbox"	Alan Crosland, Jr.	Henry Slesar	Paul Ford as Professor Jarvis, Billy Gray as Perry Hatch	October 10, 1961
Professor Jarvis (Ford) is a teacher of anatomy who discovers that one of his students Perry Hatch (Gray) is cheating on an exam. Perry pleads for forgiveness, but Jarvis threatens to write a letter to Perry's father. Perry meets with friend Denny (Brothers) to discuss the situation and figure that Jarvis is so grumpy because of his domineering wife and their frequent, violent quarrels. Later, Perry and Denny visit Jarvis to try to get him to change his mind so that he won't potentially lose access to his family's money. At Jarvis's house, Perry sees the professor disposing of an old hat box. Knowing that Jarvis's wife Margaret has not been seen in six or seven months, he begins to suspect foul play. He examines the hat box and discovers a brand-new hat, which is very unlikely to be thrown away. Perry informs a police inspector, Lieutenant Roman (Maxwell), who interviews Jarvis when the story of the wife visiting her sister falls apart. Jarvis claims that he and his wife are separated and denies that there has been any wrongdoing. Roman accepts Jarvis's story that he still loves her and returns his wife's hat. Jarvis takes the hat to his study, places it on a skeleton hanging there, and says simply "Goodnight, Margaret". Supporting Cast: Frank Maxwell as Lieutenant Roman, Jamie Brothers as Denny
231	2	"Bang! You're Dead"	Alfred Hitchcock	Story by : Margery Vosper; Teleplay by : Harold Swanton	Bill Mumy as Jackie Chester	October 17, 1961
Six-year-old Jackie Chester (Mumy) loves playing guns. He is delighted when his Uncle Rick (Dunne) arrives from Africa with a surprise gift. His parents Fred (Elliot) and Amy (Prentis) talk with Rick about the noise and danger of Africa that he faced. Unable to wait until Rick unpacks, Jackie goes through his uncle's bags and finds a gun and ammunition. Jackie thinks it is a toy, the gift his uncle promised, so he goes outside to play with it. He "holds up" the mailman (Lukas) before going to the local supermarket. He argues with little girl Darlene (Ellison) and her father (Soule) over riding a mechanical horse. Jackie's parents and Uncle Rick discover that Jackie is on the loose with a loaded gun and set out frantically to find him, asking the market manager (Zaremba), market clerk (Duncan), and cashier (Burton), while a customer (Canfield) rants. Jackie only stops "shooting" people to enjoy a snack given to him by a Jiffy snack girl (Kristen). After aiming and not firing the gun at various people, Jackie goes home and asks the maid, Cleo (Moore), to play with him. When she says she's too busy, Jackie aims the gun and fires it at her. Uncle Rick and the parents arrive just in time to deflect the shot. Supporting Cast: Biff Elliot as Fred Chester, Stephen Dunne as Rick Sheffield, Juanita Moore as Cleo, Lucy Prentis as Amy Chester, Marta Kristen as Jiffy Snack Girl, John Zaremba as Market Manager, Karl Lukas as Mailman, Olan Soule as Darlene's Daddy, Craig Duncan as Market Clerk, Thayer Burton as Cashier, Kelly Flynn as Stephen (uncredited), Joy Ellison as Darlene (uncredited), Mary Grace Canfield as Supermarket Customer (uncredited)
232	3	"Maria"	Boris Sagal	Story by : John Wyndham; Teleplay by : John Collier	Nita Talbot as Carol Torbey, Norman Lloyd as Leo Torbey	October 24, 1961
Leo Torbey (Lloyd) works at a carnival and wakes one day after a night of drinking to discover that he has bought a strange monkey for his sideshow for $500. The monkey is actually a dwarf named Maria (de Mars) who draws portraits of people while disguised as a monkey. Multiple people are impressed with Maria and offer to buy her, including carny Benny (Martin) and girlfriend Lena (Anders). Maria falls in love with Leo, which causes problems with Leo's wife Carol (Talbot). When Leo is away, El Magnifico (Hashim) tries to seduce Carol. Maria draws a picture depicting Carol and El Magnifico in an embrace. Seeing the picture and finding Carol's shoes to be muddy, Leo accuses Carol of cheating on him. He throws her out despite her angry denial and goes looking for El Magnifico, finding only an elderly woman (Bennett) who states that El Magnifico went to the hospital for his appendix, meaning he and Carol are innocent. Finally having Leo all to herself, Maria confesses her love for Leo. Angrily, Leo spurns her affections and sells her to Benny. Leo writes to his wife begging her to return. Unfortunately, Leo is killed by an enraged Benny who was driven to a murderous rage after he saw a drawing by Maria that showed Leo and Lena in a romantic embrace. Supporting Cast: Edmund Hashim as El Magnifico, Merry Anders as Lena, Venus de Mars as Maria, Kreg Martin as Benny, Marjorie Bennett as Elderly Woman, Doug Carlson as Roustabout, Billy Curtis as Carnival Visitor (uncredited)
233	4	"Cop for a Day"	Paul Henreid	Henry Slesar	Walter Matthau as Phil	October 31, 1961
Cool-headed Phil (Matthau) and impetuous Davey (Cannon) are two stick-up men who get into trouble when Davey shoots a bank messenger (Begley) during a holdup on a city street, while a helpless woman (Dudley) watches and screams for help. Phil leaves their hideout to get some space from Davey, as well as to retrieve a newspaper and some sandwiches from the local seller (Winogradoff). When he reads the newspaper, he realizes that the messenger died and that they now face a murder charge. He is determined to eliminate the witness and devises a plan, but he refuses to tell Davey about it. Phil goes to see a friend, Marty Hersh (Fein), and must talk his way past his receptionist (Brown). Phil disguises himself as a police officer after buying an outfit from Marty and manages to bluff his way past the guards, Tom Spinelli (Reiner) and Max Miller (Kane), at the witness's apartment. He kills the witness and makes a successful escape. Later, when he returns to his hideout, he is shot by Davey, who mistakes him for a real cop coming to arrest him. Supporting Cast: Glenn Cannon as Davey, Bernard Fein as Marty Hersh, Susan Brown as Receptionist, Carol Grace as Woman, Tom Begley as Bank Messenger, Anatol Winogradoff as Counterman, Robert Reiner as Officer Tom Spinelli, George Kane as Officer Max Miller
234	5	"Keep Me Company"	Alan Crosland, Jr.	Henry Slesar	Anne Francis as Julia Reddy	November 7, 1961
Julia Reddy (Francis) fixes dinner for her husband Marco (Hashim) and his brothers Kenny (Wells) and Sam (Ponti). When Marco tells her that he is working late again with his brothers, Julia is angry to be left alone again. She wants a dog, but Marco has allergies. Late at night, she hears a noise and calls the police (Pope and McLeod). The police think it's a false alarm caused by cats, but she gets an idea. She calls a detective and asks him to find the prowler. When Detective Parks (Ging) arrives, she speaks of her past in Cincinnati and tries to seduce him. Marco arrives, but when he sees the pair, he doesn't get jealous. He tries to run away. The detective apprehends Marco and Julie discovers that Marco and his brothers have been robbing warehouses at night; indeed, Marco's actual name is Harry Miland. Her unwitting trick on her husband has gotten him arrested. Supporting Cast: Edmund Hashim as Marco Reddy / Harry Miland, Jack Ging as Detective Joe Parks, Billy Wells as Kenny Reddy, Sal Ponti as Sam Reddy, Hinton Pope as Cop, Howard McLeod as Cop
235	6	"Beta Delta Gamma"	Alan Crosland, Jr.	Calvin Clements	Burt Brinckerhoff as Alan, Barbara Steele as Phyllis	November 14, 1961
Mark (Howard) and Alan (Brinkerhoff) are fraternity brothers, aka frat boys. During a party at a beachfront frat house with fellow brothers Robert (Crothers) and Franklin (Darden) and female friends Phyllis (Steele), Beth (Harris), and Dodo (Mason), Mark challenges Alan to a drinking contest. Valedictorian Alan drinks a full pitcher of beer, but Mark refuses to do the same. Alan becomes angry, but he and Mark eventually pass out. Alan's frat brothers decide to play a joke on him by injecting Mark with a substance to make him appear dead and putting makeup on him. They place a bloody weapon in Alan's hand, hoping that when he wakes up, he'll think he killed Mark. The prank goes off according to plan until Alan decides to cover up the "murder". He buries Mark's body in a blanket on the beach. When the prank is revealed to him, he and the group desperately return to the beach. Unfortunately, the high tide has washed away all traces of Mark's grave. Supporting Cast: Severn Darden as Franklin, Joel Crothers as Robert, Barbara Harris as Beth, Duke Howard as Mark, Petrie Mason as Dodo
236	7	"You Can't Be a Little Girl All Your Life"	Norman Lloyd	Story by : Stanley Ellin; Teleplay by : Helen Nielsen	Dick York as Tom Barton	November 21, 1961
While her husband Tom (York) is away, Julie Barton (Kearney) is attacked in her home by an intruder and is looked after by Dr. Vaughn (Milan). She tells police Lieutenant Christensen (de Corsia) and District Attorney Mr. Dahl (Caine) that she didn't get a good look at him but managed to fight him off. In the process of fighting, she ripped one of the intruder's leather gloves. Julie is terrified, even locking all the doors so that the grocery deliveryman (Gilleran) can't get in the kitchen. Her father, Mr. Dutton (Quinn), stops by to give her flowers and speak with Tom about her delicate nature, and a policeman (Britton) stops by to tell them that the police have arrested someone. When she goes to identify the intruder in a police lineup, she wears a pair of dark sunglasses, leading the lieutenant to question her to reveal her fear of strangers. She identifies one of the men, Charles Brunner (Perron), who is being treated by psychiatrist Dr. Karlweiss (De Koven), and her husband Tom attacks Brunner. Unfortunately, Tom breaks his own leg. Later, as Tom is preparing to go to the doctor's office, Julie notices a ripped leather glove in his possession. Tom reveals that pressure from a failed deal at work has caused him to have a breakdown. He admits that he got drunk and snapped, and it was he who attacked her. Julie goes to the police and tells them they got the wrong man as Tom lunges to stop her but, due to the broken leg he brought on himself with his theatrical feint, fails. Supporting Cast: Ted de Corsia as Lieutenant Christensen, Howard Caine as District Attorney Mr. Dahl, Bill Quinn as Mr. Dutton, Carolyn Kearney as Julie Barton, Larry Perron as Charles Brunner, Roger De Koven as Dr. Karlweiss, Frank Milan as Dr. Vaughn, Keith Britton as Policeman, Tom Gilleran as Grocery Deliveryman
237	8	"The Old Pro"	Paul Henreid	Story by : H. A. De Rosso; Teleplay by : Calvin Clements	Richard Conte as Frank Burns, Sara Shane as Loretta Burns	November 28, 1961
Loretta Burns (Shane) is under the mistaken impression that her husband Frank (Conte) is really a former engineer. Frank is actually a hit man who is being extorted by newspaper man Cullen (Harris) for over $40,000. Frank calls his former boss Nicholson (Anderson) for help ("an engineer") regarding the blackmail situation. Nicholson sends Mace (Carlyle) to help Frank make it look like Cullen drowns, but Mace is actually working with Cullen, who had called Nicholson first. When Cullen threatens to tell Loretta about Frank's past, Frank drowns both Mace and Cullen. Hearing the news, Nicholson shows up at Frank's lakeside home and insists that Frank return to work. He tells Frank that if he doesn't, his wife may end up getting rubbed out. Supporting Cast: John Anderson as Joey 'Nick' Nicholson, Stacy Harris as Cullen, Richard Carlyle as Mace
238	9	"I Spy"	Norman Lloyd	Story by : John Mortimer; Teleplay by : John Collier	Kay Walsh as Mrs. Morgan, Eric Barker as Mr. Frute	December 5, 1961
London. A lawyer (Parker) helps a man named Captain Morgan (Kendall) hire a private detective named Frute (Barker) in order to spy on his wife (Walsh). Morgan is convinced that his wife, a hotel waitress, is cheating on him. As Frute starts following Mrs. Morgan, pretending to be a hotel waiter, he finds that Mrs. Morgan, rather than cheating, only spends time with her friend and fellow waitress Gladys (Duxbury). Frute begins to fall for her, while Mrs. Morgan feels sad for him and is suspicious of him, having seen him following her and Gladys. They talk of her failed relationship with Captain Morgan and the Captain's extreme jealousy. The two begin an affair, though Mrs. Morgan does not know he was hired to spy on her. Later, Captain Morgan demands evidence of his wife's infidelity. When pressed by the lawyer, Frute gives Captain Morgan detailed descriptions of his own meetings with Mrs. Morgan. Angrily, Morgan issues divorce papers to a process server (Selby), thusly clearing the way for a loving relationship between Frute and Mrs. Morgan, as Frute admits the entire truth to the future Mrs. Frute. Supporting Cast: William Kendall as Captain Morgan, Elspeth Duxbury as Gladys, Cecil Parker as Lawyer, Nicholas Selby as Process Server
239	10	"Services Rendered"	Paul Henreid	Richard Levinson & William Link	Steve Dunne as the Young Amnesiac	December 12, 1961
While passing a construction site, a young man (Dunne) is hit on the head when a workman drops a board (Romano) and gets amnesia while an old woman (Nesmith) discusses a similar situation from her past. He can't remember who he is or where he was going, so he sits on a park bench while talking with a local named Cyrus Rutherford (Helton), who takes him to a local bar. The bartender, Jimmy (Remsen), isn't very friendly, as Cyrus has no money, but Cyrus tries to help the amnesiac remember his identity while running up the man's alcohol bill. The only clues he finds in his wallet: a thousand-dollar bill and a slip of paper with the name and address of Dr. Ralph Mannick. With only the thousand-dollar bill, the man cannot pay the tab, leading the owner, Ben (Lukas), to kick him out. He visits Mannick (Marlowe), but the doctor and his nurse, Miss Sherman (Hale), don't recognize him. The doctor suggests that something familiar may trigger his memories to return. He sees a picture of the doctor's wife and wonders whether he has a wife of his own. His memory returns when he goes to get on the elevator, and he realizes that the thousand dollars was from the doctor's wife. He's a hitman whom she hired to kill her husband, so he visits the doctor again after Miss Sherman has left, explains everything, and fulfills his contract. Supporting Cast: Hugh Marlowe as Dr. Ralph Mannick (character credited as Dr. Mannix in end credits), Percy Helton as Cyrus Rutherford, Karl Lukas as Uncle Ben the Bar Owner, Bert Remsen as Jimmy the Bartender, Bernadette Hale as Miss Sherman (the Nurse), Andy Romano as Young Workman, Ottola Nesmith as Woman
240	11	"The Right Kind of Medicine"	Alan Crosland, Jr.	Henry Slesar	Robert Redford as Charlie Marx (credited as Charlie Pugh in end credits), Joby Baker as Vernon	December 19, 1961
Charlie Marx (Redford) is a ruthless armed burglar who one day kills a police officer in a shootout after robbing a jewelry store of $1,500, and Charlie himself is shot in the left leg. A police officer (Remsen) questions a witness (Kates). Charlie visits Dr. Vogel (Clarke), who prescribes pain killers and wraps Charlie's leg, as the bullet passed through. When he goes to the drug store, he hears his own description on the drug store's radio. Charlie impatiently attempts to hide his appearance while the clerk, Vernon (Baker), talks with customers Mr. Grissom (Swoger) and police sergeant Tommy (Karnes). The pharmacist, Mr. Fletcher (Collins), doesn't realize Charlie is the murderer and gives him the painkillers. Meanwhile, a police lieutenant (Calder) works to get Lassiter to identify the killer through mugshots. Later, Charlie returns to his apartment but doesn't take the pain killers as he wants to stay alert, in case he has to make a run for it. He decides to skip town and heads for the bus station, but almost immediately, he runs into Vernon in the hallway. Thinking that Vernon knows that he is a criminal, he shoots him and leaves. Mr. Fletcher is called to identify Vernon, who is barely hanging on. When he arrives, he reveals that he sent Vernon to Charlie's because he made a mistake in his prescription. Instead of giving him painkillers, he gave him a bottle of poison. Supporting Cast: Gage Clarke as Dr. Emmet Vogel, Russell Collins as Mr. Fletcher, Bernard Kates as George Lassiter (the witness), Harry Swoger as Mr. Grissom, King Calder as Police Lieutenant, Robert Karnes as Tommy the Police Sergeant, Bert Remsen as Pete the Police Officer, Gail Bonney as Miss Lewis the Drugstore Customer (uncredited) Note: The child actor who played Miguel Continez and the actress who played Miguel's mother, Mrs. Continez, are uncredited and currently unknown. The actor who played Police Officer Reynolds is uncredited and currently unknown.
241	12	"A Jury of Her Peers"	Robert Florey	Story by : Susan Glaspell; Teleplay by : James Cavanagh	Ann Harding as Sarah Hale, June Walker as Millie Wright	December 26, 1961
Jim Hale (Teal) arrives to the Wright home to discuss adopting a party line, only to find Millie Wright (Walker) in a relative state of shock and husband John dead upstairs from strangulation. Millie claims she found him thusly after feeding the chickens. Jim takes Millie to his home to stay with his wife Sarah (Harding), who questions Millie as to why she married John. Sheriff Henry Peters (Bray) and George Henderson (Bourneuf) discuss Millie's motive, while Sarah and the sheriff's wife, Mary Peters (Reid), decide to do some investigating on their own. They find evidence that Millie is the murderer, but they also discovered that Millie's husband was a violent brute who probably deserved what he got (as he strangled Millie's pet canary and was known to be cold and harsh towards Millie for over 20 years). Sarah helps Mary understand the loneliness of isolated farm life, as Mary lives in the heart of the town. Instead of turning in the evidence, the two decide to say nothing. Supporting Cast: Robert Bray as Sheriff Henry Peters, Ray Teal (credited as Ray E. Teal) as Jim Hale, Philip Bourneuf as George Henderson, Frances Reid as Mrs. Mary Peters
242	13	"The Silk Petticoat"	John Newland	Story by : Joseph Shearing; Teleplay by : Halsted Welles & Norman Ginsbury	Michael Rennie as Sir Humphrey J. Orford, Antoinette Bower as Elisa Minden-Orford	January 2, 1962
London, 1817. Elisa Minden (Bower) begins to have second thoughts about her upcoming marriage to Sir Humphrey J. Orford (Rennie). She has these second thoughts because he took her to his first wife's grave (from 1793) and talked about torture as a way of purifying those guilty of infidelity, which Flora had committed after just a month of marriage. Just before they arrive at the Orford mansion, servant Mrs. Boyd (Lloyd) welcomes Elisa's father, Dr. Minden (Livesey). Elisa wants to see Humphrey's study, which he reluctantly allows, but she is greatly frightened by a painting of a hanging and the atmosphere in general. She finds out that he has lied about Mrs. Lloyd and the study after Mrs. Lloyd reveals that no one has been in the study since Flora died. Humphrey finally admits that the man in the painting was a convict whom he sentenced to death personally. Dr. Minden reveals that he owes Humphrey a great debt which would be settled by the marriage. After she is married, the parlor maid (Glessing) introduces Elisa's cousin Phillip Haven (Frankham) to the couple, and Humphrey is quite cold, while Elisa wants details as to Phillip's army life in India. Humphrey wants nothing to do with Phillip, while Elisa admits that she and Phillip loved each other in their youth. Elisa's worst fears come true when Humphrey is found stabbed to death in his locked study. The murder was committed by Humphrey's first wife, Flora (O'Hara), who is not dead. She was locked up in his study and has been kept there for years. She is now insane and could not call for help because Humphrey had cut out her tongue for adultery. Supporting Cast: David Frankham as Phillip Haven, Shirley O'Hara as Flora, Doris Lloyd as Mrs. Boyd, Jack Livesey as Dr. Minden, Mollie Glessing as Parlor Maid
243	14	"Bad Actor"	John Newland	Story by : Max Franklin; Teleplay by : Robert Bloch	Robert Duvall as Bart Conway, Charles Robinson as Jerry Lane, William Schallert as Lieutenant Gunderson	January 9, 1962
Bart Conway (Duvall) is woken by agent Ed Boling (Lewis) after passing out while listening to music. Bart is a struggling actor with a bad temper and a drinking problem. He finds himself competing with a fellow actor, Jerry Lane (C. Robinson), for the part of a strangler in an upcoming mystery, and he is frustrated by the secretary (Helton) keeping him waiting on behalf of casting director Donald Wellman (B. Robinson). Afterward, he goes drinking with his girlfriend, Marge Rogers, at a beatnik club, where he accuses Marge of having a relationship with Jerry, who arrives shortly. He invites Jerry over to his apartment for a little rehearsing, drinking, and music, as he tires of the bongo player (Grey Eagle). Bart gets a little too into character and chokes Jerry to death. To cover up his crime, he chops up the body and dissolves most of it in acid, but he is interrupted before completion. Marge and Ed stop by after not being able to reach him by telephone to tell Bart that he got the acting job. Police Lieutenant Gunderson (Schallert) also stops by to question him about Jerry's disappearance but initially finds nothing amiss. Before he leaves, he accepts a glass of ice water from Marge and Ed. However, due to Bart's suspicious oversensitivity around his favorite ice bucket, the lieutenant investigates and discovers Jerry's undissolved head in the bucket. Supporting Cast: Bartlett Robinson as Donald Wellman, David Lewis as Ed Boling, Carole Eastman as Marjorie 'Marge' Rogers, Jo Helton as Secretary, Raven Grey Eagle as Bongo Player, Dorothy Neumann as Miss Schmeltz (uncredited)
244	15	"The Door Without a Key"	Herschel Daugherty	Story by : Norman Daniels; Teleplay by : Irving Elman	Claude Rains as Leonard Eldridge, Bill Mumy as Mickey Hollins	January 16, 1962
Sergeant Shaw (Larch) and a lieutenant (Carson) work the night shift at a police station, the 16th precinct, when he is approached by an old man, Leonard Eldridge (Rains), who is suffering from amnesia. A lost boy, Michael 'Mickey' Hollins (Mumy), then appears. Shaw tries to send the man to a hospital and the boy to home. Both, however, refuse to go. Eventually more people arrive, such as drunk Maggie Vanderman (Gilchrist), who is brought in by patrolman Barry (Romano). Deliveryman Dave (Fresco) drops off food for all the visitors. A squad car officer (Gilman) brings in three motorcyclists, Marti Thomas (Hart), Dewey Sims (Hawkins), and Larry Rowan (Malloy), but they are soon released. Each person brought in seems lost in one way or another. Eventually Shaw manages to clear out everyone but the boy, the old man, and drunken Maggie, who has passed out. The boy reveals that his father left him at the police station so that he would be sent to a home, as the father met a woman and Mickey's mother is dead. When he hears this, the old man's memory returns. He speaks of living on a farm when younger and having ducks taken by a hawk, which taught him to be strong. He is wealthy and has lost his family, as his wife, Madge, and child died. He lives all alone in an enormous mansion in Hartsdale. Shaw urges the old man to adopt the boy so that both of them can have a family, and Leonard and Mickey happily leave together (just before Sergeant Harris of juvenile hall arrives to take Mickey and Leonard). Supporting Cast: John Larch as Sergeant Shaw, Connie Gilchrist as Maggie Vanderman, Jimmy Hawkins as Dewey Sims, David Fresco as Dave, Jeff Malloy (credited as Jeff Parker) as Larry Rowan, Andy Romano as Barry the Patrolman, Sam Gilman as Squad Car Officer, Susan Hart as Marti Thomas (uncredited) Note: The actor who played Sergeant Harris of juvenile hall is uncredited and currently unknown.
245	16	"The Case of M.J.H."	Alan Crosland, Jr.	Henry Slesar	Barbara Baxley as Maude Sheridan, Robert Loggia as James 'Jimmy' French	January 23, 1962
Psychoanalyst Dr. Ernest Cooper (Newton) employs shy and reserved Maude Sheridan (Baxley), who falls for a crook named Jimmy French (Loggia) after meeting him in a cafeteria, followed by him calling her at her workplace. French tells Maude of his criminal background, and they start dating. When Maude initially declines, Jimmy doesn't talk to her for two weeks, leaving Maude to seek out information about him from his landlady (Eaton). Eventually, he convinces her to allow him to look at Dr. Cooper's private files, as he owes $2000 in debt. He wants to blackmail at least one of Cooper's patients. French picks the file of M.J. Harrison, a real estate agent. He discovers that Harrison had an affair with a woman named Diana. French visits Harrison (Gaines) at his office and is let in by the receptionist (Leigh), and he proceeds to demand $10,000 cash from Harrison in exchange for silence. Harrison agrees to bring the money to French's home that night but kills French instead. Dr. Cooper tells Maude the bad news about French the next day. He then reveals that Harrison never had an affair. It was all the product of his disturbed mind. He believed the delusion so strongly, however, that he was willing to kill to protect it. Supporting Cast: Richard Gaines as M.J. Harrison, Theodore Newton as Dr. Cooper, Marjorie Eaton as Landlady, Leatrice Leigh as Receptionist
246	17	"The Faith of Aaron Menefee"	Norman Lloyd	Story by : Stanley Ellin; Teleplay by : Ray Bradbury	Andrew Prine as Aaron Menefee, Sidney Blackmer as Reverend Otis Jones	January 30, 1962
Reverend Otis Jones (Blackmer) is a faith healer whose driver Brother Fish (Soule) stops at a service station to get Jones' car repaired. Station worker Aaron Menefee (Prine) is an honest man who impresses the reverend so much that he agrees to cure his ulcer. Aaron becomes attracted to Rev. Jones's daughter Emily (Pierce). He quits his job and joins the reverend's revival show, where he witnesses a woman (Bonney) receive "healing". Aaron tells the town doctor, Doc Buckles (Armstrong), that he has been called to serve Jones, but the doc says that Aaron has never had an ulcer and has been called to do various wild things throughout his life, which has gotten him arrested multiple times. Aaron wants to marry Emily, as the two have become quite close, but the reverend does not give his permission. The reverend does not believe Aaron's faith in him is strong enough for him to marry his daughter, and indeed he says that he reigns over Emily as long as he lives. Later the revival returns to Aaron's town. Aaron discovers that Doc Buckles is being held by two hoodlums, one of whom, Vern Byers (Hanmer), is injured with paralyzed legs. Aaron believes that this is a test of faith. He goes to Reverend Jones, gives him the $1000 given to him by Byers, and calls for the reverend to cure the injured man; Jones happily agrees. The hoodlums warn that Jones will be killed if his faith healing does not work. The result in never shown, but Aaron wins either way. Either the faith healing worked, and Aaron's faith is demonstrated, or the faith healing failed, and Jones is killed. In either case, it seems that Aaron will be free to marry Emily. Supporting Cast: Maggie Pierce as Emily Jones, Don Hanmer as Vern Byers, Olan Soule as Brother Fish, Robert Armstrong as Doc Buckles, Gail Bonney as Woman, Bess Flowers as Meeting Guest (uncredited), Joe Ploski as Meeting Guest (uncredited), Mathew McCue as Meeting Guest (uncredited), Fox O'Callahan as Meeting Guest (uncredited), James J. Casino as Meeting Guest (uncredited), Daniel Elam as Meeting Guest (uncredited), Laura Gile as Meeting Guest (uncredited) Note: The actor who played the hoodlum Al is uncredited and is currently unknown.
247	18	"The Woman Who Wanted to Live"	Alan Crosland, Jr.	Bryce Walton	Charles Bronson as Ray Bardon, Lola Albright as Lisa	February 6, 1962
After killing a gas station attendant (Montgomery) in a robbery attempt, a wounded Ray Bardon (Bronson) stops a girl named Lisa (Albright) and demands to be driven to safety. Lisa, realizing that her life is in danger, agrees. Ray almost kills her, but Lisa convinces him that it would be a better cover to have her with him, as police are looking for a solo male. As she drives, Ray falls asleep. Suddenly, the car gets a flat tire. Instead of making an escape, Lisa changes the tire. Just then, a dragster pulls alongside, with three young gang members, Fat Boy (Bryant), Rook (Curtis), and Cuke (Rudelson). After a brief scuffle, Ray scares them off with his gun. Later, the two stop at a motel, and Lisa gets a room from the manageress (Fax). Ray wonders about the girl's loyalty and asks why she didn't run and go to the police. As he talks, Lisa manages to get his gun. She reveals that the gas station attendant was her fiancée and that she didn't leave because she was waiting for the opportunity to kill Ray. Supporting Cast: Jesslyn Fax as Motel Manageress, Ray Montgomery as Fred the Gas Station Attendant, Ben Bryant as Fat Boy, Craig Curtis as Rook, Robert Rudelson as Cuke
248	19	"Strange Miracle"	Norman Lloyd	Story by : George Langelaan; Teleplay by : Halsted Welles	David Opatoshu as Pedro Siqueras, Míriam Colón as Lolla Siqueras	February 13, 1962
Pedro Siqueras (Opatoshu) fakes paralysis, even initially with his wife Lolla (Colon), after a train wreck in order to collect a huge insurance settlement from insurance adjustor Señor Vargas (DeKova). After collecting the money, he doesn't want to stay in the wheelchair. The local priest (Cianelli) introduces them to a young girl named Maria (Pedroza) who really is paralyzed and is pulled around on a cart by a goat. He discovers that she has been going to a nearby holy shrine for years hoping for a cure. Pedro gets an idea to do the same, so he visits the shrine overseen by a nun (Menard) and begins to pray. On the fifth day of his prayer, he stands and pretends to be healed. After he stands, his legs collapse. He discovers that he is now paralyzed for real. At the same time, some distance away, Maria is cured. Supporting Cast: Frank DeKova as Señor Vargas, Adelina Pedroza as Maria, Eduardo Ciannelli as Priest, Tina Menard as Nun, Charles Soldani as Townsman (uncredited), Maria Haro as Townswoman (uncredited), Kay Koury as Townswoman (uncredited), Ray Beltram as Townsman (uncredited), Emma Palmese as Townswoman (uncredited), Theresa Testa as Townswoman (uncredited)
249	20	"The Test"	Boris Sagal	Henry Slesar	Brian Keith as Vernon Wedge, Eduardo Ciannelli as Mr. Marino	February 20, 1962
A desperate Mr. Marino (Ciannelli), the father of Benjy Marino, begs secretary Olga (Thompson) to let him see noted attorney Vernon Wedge (Keith). Benjy (Lauren), a member of the Barons gang, is accused of stabbing an opposing gang member with a knife. Vernon decides to take the case, but his case for the defense seems hopeless as there are multiple witnesses and the supposed murder weapon was found on Benjy soon after the incident. Witness Sol Dankers (Holtz) is questioned by prosecutor Wickers (Gravers) and testifies about seeing Benjy fleeing with the bloody knife. The victim's mother, Mrs. Archer (McVeagh), then tearfully testifies about victim Kenny's character. While visiting friend Dr. Haggerty (Bramley), Vernon discovers the existence of a special test that can determine if a knife blade ever had blood on it, and Kenny swears that the knife is new and has never had blood on it. He tries to conduct the test in court with the judge's (Lane) permission, but the prosecution resists stating the test to be theatrics, so the judge sustains the objection. Even without the test, however, Vernon manages to get Benjy off, as the jury foreman (Hilleary) issues a not-guilty verdict. Later, Vernon decides to conduct the test in order to determine whether Benjy was really innocent. Before he can conduct the test, Benjy's father arrives and cuts himself with the murder weapon. By doing so, he prevents Vernon from ever knowing the truth about the case. Supporting Cast: Rod Lauren as Benjy Marino, Tenen Holtz as Sol Dankers, Steve Gravers as Wickers, Eve McVeagh as Mrs. Archer, William Bramley as Dr. Haggerty, Dee J. Thompson as Olga, Rusty Lane as The Judge, Kenneth Harp (credited as Ken Harp) as Bailiff, Dick Hilleary as Jury Foreman, Bill Raisch as Juror (uncredited), William H. O'Brien as Juror (uncredited), Lillian O'Malley as Juror (uncredited), Harry Raven as Juror (uncredited), Arline Bletcher as Juror (uncredited), Edwin Rochelle as Court Clerk (uncredited)
250	21	"Burglar Proof"	John Newland	Henry Slesar	Robert Webber as Harrison Fell, Paul Hartman as Sammy Morrisey	February 27, 1962
Harrison Fell (Webber) is an ad executive that needs to come up with an ad campaign to sell the 801 Burglar-Proof safe and impress his boss, Mr. Bliss (Bissell), on behalf of client Wilton Stark (Ober). Harrison visits notorious safe-cracker Sammy Morrisey (Hartman) and his daughter Dorothy (Lloyd) to offer Sammy $500 to break into the safe in front of the press at a gala ball. He challenges Sammy to open the 2,370-pound safe in less than three hours, from 9:00 PM until midnight. If Sammy can do it, he can keep an envelope containing $50,000 that is being kept within the safe. If he cannot, then he gets only the consolation prize. Initially, Sammy is reluctant, as he has given up on safe-cracking and is trying out a new profession. Eventually, though, he agrees to participate. At the party, security officer Mr. Grady (McLeod) puts the envelope in the safe and locks it. Sammy is given three hours, but he fails to open the safe and is given the consolation prize of $500. Harrison, Bliss, and Stark are pleased since Harrison's advertising plan is a success. Later the next day, however, Stark opens the safe and discovers that the envelope contains only worthless paper and no money, so he blames Mr. Bliss and Harrison. Sammy pulled a switch. His new profession is as a pickpocket, and he is training his daughter to follow in his footsteps. Supporting Cast: Philip Ober as Wilton Stark, Josie Lloyd as Dorothy, Whit Bissell as Mr. Bliss, Howard McLeod as Mr. Grady, Bert L. Stevens as Demonstration Guest (uncredited), William H. O'Brien as Demonstration Guest (uncredited), Harold Miller as Demonstration Guest (uncredited)
251	22	"The Big Score"	Boris Sagal	Story by : Sam Merwin, Jr. Teleplay by : Bryce Walton	Evans Evans as Dora, Phillip Reed as Mr. F. Hubert Fellowes, Joseph Trapaso as Murphy	March 6, 1962
Dora (Evans) babysits Larry Fellowes (Spees) for his father, wealthy F. Hubert Fellowes (Reed). She plans to rob him with her boyfriend Mike (Gilleran) and his buddies Gino (Campos) and Arnie (Sills). The three carry out the robbery, but, as they are about to leave, Fellowes returns and tries to stop them. He is stabbed by the violent hotheaded Gino and killed. The three make off with $32,000, an engraved lighter, and a revolver, while Dora calls the police and provides a false story with Lieutenant Morgan (Zaremba). As the money is in big denominations, Gino tells the gang to lay low while he works to fence the cash. Dora flirts with Gino while Mike and Arnie are out, saying she wants Gino and is bored with Mike. Gino goes to see his fence Ozzie (Jacobs) for a radio that has a police band, only to find that Mike and Arnie sold the engraved lighter to Ozzie. Gino and Dora flee with the money in a dragster, but Ozzie and associate Murphy (Trapaso) follow them and pull them over. Fellowes was a big-time syndicate gangster, Ozzie and Murphy's boss, and the mob sent out hitman Murphy for revenge. Supporting Cast: Rafael Campos as Gino, John Zaremba as Lieutenant Morgan, Tom Gilleran as Mike, Nick Sills as Arnie, Jesse Jacobs as Ozzie, Timmie Spees as Larry Fellowes
252	23	"Profit-Sharing Plan"	Bernard Girard	Richard Levinson & William Link	Henry Jones as Miles Cheever	March 13, 1962
On Miles Cheever's (Jones) last day of work, he is congratulated by the elevator operator (Sweeney) and given a surprise retirement party by his boss Mr. Dougherty (Davis) and employees Rudy (Maxwell) and Miss Lemmon (Hill), among others. When he comes home, his wife (Storey) tells him that he deserved more for fifteen years than two ink pens and a minuscule pension. Miles agrees and that night goes to the office and robs the safe, returning home to show his wife the bounty. Intending to leave his wife, he then picks up his girlfriend Anita (Sand) and they head to the airport to catch a flight to Hawaii. Upon arriving, an airline clerk (Brown) easily checks them in, but a stewardess (Jackson) tells Miles to put his suitcase in a rear storage compartment. He declines, but another stewardess (Noel) picks it up and takes it. Though the suitcase contains the money from the office, Miles reluctantly accepts the situation. However, the entire plane is suddenly emptied for over half an hour. As he waits to reboard the plane, he learns that a bomb threat has been called in. Since the police are searching the bags, he worries that he will be caught. A plain-clothes police officer (Pope) calls Miles and Anita over to question them about the cash just as they start to leave the airport. What Miles doesn't realize is that his wife called in the bomb threat. She knew he was having an affair and called in the threat so that he'd get caught. After she watches the police take Miles and Anita away, she calls the airline again and tells them that the threat was a joke. Supporting Cast: Frank Maxwell as Rudy, Stephanie Hill as Miss Lemmon, Ruth Storey as Mrs. Cheever, Rebecca Sand as Anita, Humphrey Davis as Mr. Dougherty, Lew Brown as Airline Clerk, Hinton Pope as Plain-Clothes Police Officer, Lael Jackson as Stewardess, Suzanne Noel as Junior Stewardess, Jim Sweeney as Elevator Operator
253	24	"Apex"	Alan Crosland, Jr.	Story by : James Workman; Teleplay by : John T. Kelley	Patricia Breslin as Margo, Mark Miller as Claude Shorup, Vivienne Segal as Clara Shorup	March 20, 1962
Claude Shorup (Miller) is cheating on his wife of seven years, Clara (Segal), with Clara's best friend Margo (Breslin). He deceives both women about his whereabouts, telling his wife that he is at the club and his girlfriend that he has a late work meeting. Since Clara has been having problems with Claude, she asks Margo for advice. She wonders whether she shouldn't have made Claude the president of the company she owns. Margo tells Claude that his wife suspects him of having an affair and is going to divorce him. Since he will be left broke after a divorce, Margo suggests that Claude kill his wife. Claude tries to kill Clara with a knife but has second thoughts. Later he tells Margo that he will hire someone to do it, so Margo decides to kill Clara herself. She offers Clara poison-laced rose petal tea, and Clara drinks it and dies. A man named George Weeks (Kane) then arrives and Margo pretends to be Clara in an effort to get rid of him. Weeks says that he is a caddie and is here to collect an envelope with two thousand dollars in it. She gives him the envelope. He then kills Margo believing her to be Clara. Weeks was the hitman hired by Claude to kill his wife and the two thousand dollars was his payment. Supporting Cast: George Kane as Mr. George Weeks
254	25	"The Last Remains"	Leonard Horn	Henry Slesar	Ed Gardner as Marvin Foley, John Fiedler as Amos Duff	March 27, 1962
A mortician, Amos Duff (Fiedler), arrives to work to find bill collectors calling the Silver Glen Mortuary about needed payments. His assistant, Stanley (Weinrib), arrives and notices a small puncture wound in their newest client, Robert Kessler. Duff believes the wound to be from a bullet, and after giving Stanley the day off, goes to the local librarian (Bonney) to read about Kessler's manner of death, which supposedly was from a car accident at the local aqueduct. He then goes to the office of Kessler's partner, Marvin Foley (Gardner), and is let in by his secretary (Ryder). Duff mentions that he might have to file a police report regarding a bullet wound, which Foley denies. Since Amos's business is in desperate need of money, he recommends the costly Class A service ($1800) to overlook any potential issues with Kessler's death. Marvin prefers a cremation and pays Duff an additional $600 to coincide with the original $150, with the remaining $1150 to be paid after cremation. After the cremation, Marvin refuses to pay and tells Amos that nothing can be done, since all the evidence was just destroyed. Amos, however, has kept one crucial piece of evidence: the fire-proof hunting rifle steel-jacketed bullet Marvin used to commit murder, which he then takes to police Lieutenant Morgan (Kinsella) so that he can see the look on Foley's face when he personally shows Foley the bullet. Supporting Cast: Lennie Weinrib as Stanley, Walter Kinsella as Lieutenant Morgan, Gail Bonney as Librarian, Molly Ryder as Secretary (The Girl)
255	26	"Ten O'Clock Tiger"	Bernard Girard	William Fay	Frankie Darro as Boots Murphy, Robert Keith as Arthur 'The Professor' Duffy	April 3, 1962
Boxing manager Arthur Duffy (Keith) is offered a powerful drug by a shady character named Boots Murphy (Darro) while boxer Soldier Fresno (Lukas) sleeps soundly. Boots tells him it is a drug used on racehorses to turn losers into winners, so Arthur decides to use the drug on one of his washed-up fighters, Soldier Fresno. After Soldier is injected with twenty units of the drug, which he believes are new vitamins, he starts to win every fight, starting with a sparring bout with Gypsy Joe (Hicks) and a real bout with Buster (Dushman). Arthur always gives the drug to Soldier after his handler (Perry), attendant (Lamont), and cornerman (Gambina) leave the room. Arthur and Boots begin to rake in the money, and soon Soldier gets a bout with the champion. Before the fight, however, Arthur tells Boots to give Soldier thirty units of the drug instead of twenty, and Boots says no. Boots also tells Arthur that he only has two more doses of the drug, as the creator died in prison. Determined to win the fight, Arthur injects Soldier with both doses. Unfortunately, the overdose causes Soldier to believe that he is already in the ring. He springs up, starts fighting, and beats Arthur to death just before the police (Romano) break in. Supporting Cast: Karl Lukas as Soldier Fresno, Chuck Hicks as Gypsy Joe, Bruce Dushman as Buster, Andy Romano as Cop, Charles Perry (credited as Charles E. Perry) as The Handler, Syl Lamont as Attendant
256	27	"Act of Faith"	Bernard Girard	Story by : Eric Ambler; Teleplay by : Nicholas Monsarrat	George Grizzard as Alan Chatterton, Dennis King as Mr. Ralston Temple	April 10, 1962
Alan Chatterton (Grizzard), an unsuccessful New York City writer, sends successful author Ralston Temple (King) a letter along with three sample chapters from his novel in progress, "The Locked Stable". Alice (MacMichael), Temple's secretary, convinces her boss that the chapters are good and are written in Temple's style, that he should meet the writer, and that perhaps Temple should even give him money to finish his book. Temple agrees to meet Chatterton, a college dropout working at a gas station, but finds him an obnoxious boor. Nevertheless, he gives him a six-month loan at $40 per week. Six months later, Temple continues to fund Chatterton even though the book is not completed. Chatterton shows up again and asks for a thousand dollars so that he can get married. Temple gives into the request, but later finds Chatterton partying with a show-biz man (Campbell) in an expensive restaurant where Temple frequents and knows the maître d' Luigi (Mate). At Temple's home the next day, Temple confronts Chatterton and rips up their contract. He then goes on vacation to Europe. Upon returning, Alice tells Temple that Chatterton has finished his book. It is a best-seller and is going to be made into a movie. Temple shows up at a store where Chatterton is autographing his book. To Temple's surprise, Chatterton gives him an autographed copy of his book plus all the money he owed him ($6600), with half interest in the book sales. Supporting Cast: Florence MacMichael as Alice, Mary Grace Canfield as Mrs. Cathy Carr the Bookstore Customer, Jeno Mate as Luigi, Alan Campbell as Show-Biz Man, Bess Flowers as Bookstore Customer (uncredited)
257	28	"The Kerry Blue"	Paul Henreid	Henry Slesar	Carmen Mathews as Thelma Malley, Gene Evans as Ned Malley	April 17, 1962
Ned Malley (Evans) greatly loves his thirteen-year-old dog Annie, a Kerry Blue, and Ned's wife Thelma (Mathews) grows jealous. Though she likes the dog, she thinks her husband's love for it is unhealthy. One day while Ned is away on a business trip to Cleveland, Annie dies, and Ned accuses his wife of murder for not calling the veterinarian, Dr. Chaff (Zaremba), and he believes that she buried Annie alive. Dr. Chaff stops by to console Ned and reassure him of the correctness of Thelma's actions. Even Ned's personal doctor, Dr. Prentiss (Reiner), notices that Ned is not the same, so he gives Ned some sleeping pills. He slips an overdose of the sleeping pills into Thelma's hot chocolate and tells her his plan of having her buried alive. As she slips into unconsciousness, Ned hears familiar barking and goes to investigate. He sees a Kerry Blue chained to Annie's doghouse. Running to the dog, he trips and fatally injures himself. A neighbor calls the police, and the detective (Carlile) revives Thelma. As her dead husband is being taken away, she wonders whether she should have told him about the new Kerry Blue. Supporting Cast: John Zaremba as Dr. Chaff, Robert Reiner as Dr. Prentiss, David Carlile as Detective
258	29	"The Matched Pearl"	Bernard Girard	Henry Slesar	John Ireland as Captain Randolph McCabe, Ernest Truex as Hubert Wilkens	April 24, 1962
A jeweler, Laurent DuBois (Genest), sells a $5000 black pearl left with him by Captain McCabe (Ireland) and then sends his assistant, Conroy (King), to cheat McCabe out of over $2300 ($2333.34, $1000 plus 33.3% commission) of the money owed to him, leaving McCabe only $2666.66. Hubert Wilkens (Truex), the pearl's buyer, asks the jeweler for a second matched pearl for his anniversary and his fussy wife Lolly (Ferrell). DuBois returns to McCabe. McCabe says that he can provide another, but since he has been cheated, he initially demands $7000 before kicking DuBois off his boat. Figuring that he can charge Wilkens a much larger amount, DuBois comes back and offers $15,000, which McCabe finally accepts. Unfortunately, DuBois discovers that he has been conned when he goes to the hotel and finds only the cleaning woman (Knight). McCabe and Wilkens were working together, as Wilkens is actually Lolly's father and McCabe is her husband. DuBois bought the same pearl twice, giving the trio a profit of over $12,600. Supporting Cast: Émile Genest as Laurent DuBois (character misidentified in closing credits as Lawrence Kirkwood), Sharon Ferrell as Lolly Wilkens, Michael King as Conroy, Charlotte Knight as Cleaning Woman
259	30	"What Frightened You, Fred?"	Paul Henreid	Story by : Jack Ritchie; Teleplay by : Joel Murcott	Edward Asner as Warden Bragan, R. G. Armstrong as Fred Riordan	May 1, 1962
Fifty-five-year-old Fred Riordan (Armstrong) is a recent parolee who vandalizes the window of a bar, gets arrested by the police (Mackin), and gets himself thrown back into prison for two more years. The prison warden, Bragan (Asner), who is also running for governor, and the prison doctor (Williams) believe Fred, who was previously the warden's favorite prison clerk, is simply afraid to cope with the outside world. They question Fred to find out why and Fred tells them that upon his release from prison, he went to his old neighborhood but found little or no welcome, except from old friend Kowalski (Martin), a local bartender. Upon going back to his old rooming house, he was rejected socially by his former girlfriend, Mae (McVeagh), who only offers to let him have his old room for $40 in advance. Fred, however, neglects to mention that a mobster named Tony Wando (Peck) invited him to a cemetery and hired him, in exchange for $25,000 over two years, to kill a former partner of his, a man now behind prison walls. Wando has damning evidence of Fred's guilt in an old unsolved murder, the knifing of a delicatessen owner, the only crime for which Fred never got caught. Warden Bragan feels sorry for Fred and promises to make him a personal trustee. This is ideal for Fred, since it is Warden Bragan himself who is the target of Wando's outrage. Supporting Cast: Adam Williams as Dr. Cullen, Eve McVeagh as Mae, Steve Peck (credited as Steven Peccaro) as Tony Wando, Kreg Martin as Kowalski, Harry Mackin as Side Man in Patrol Car
260	31	"Most Likely to Succeed"	Richard Whorf	Henry Slesar	Joanna Moore as Louise Towers, Jack Carter as Stanley Towers, Howard Morris as Dave Sumner	May 8, 1962
In college, Dave Sumner (Morris) was voted most likely to succeed, was class valedictorian, and was president of the senior class. Nowadays, however, he has had a run of bad luck, so he takes a job from fraternity brother Stanley Towers (Carter), a shady businessman. Dave is given a job helping the maid (Glessing) and driving around Stanley's wife, Louise (Moore). Stanley and Louise make money illicitly with his attorney Everett (Calder) and business associate Harry (Andersen), and Louise is constantly used as a tax deduction. Dave tells Louise about losing his wife and job at the same time and not being able to get any subsequent work except for odd jobs; Louise seems relieved to be able to talk about Stanley's various business activities. When Louise tries to get Dave to drive her away from Stanley, Stanley fires Dave. Stanley's business is being investigated by the government. At a meeting with an IRS tax investigator (Zaremba), however, Stanley is shocked to discover from New York attorney Frank Anderson (Kinsella) that Dave is really an undercover Treasury Department agent, and the most successful agent at his job as well. He only pretended to be down on his luck so he could get the goods on Stanley's shady business dealings. Supporting Cast: Walter Kinsella as Attorney Frank Anderson, John Zaremba as Tax Investigator, King Calder as Stanley's Attorney Everett, Molly Glessing as Maid, Bruce Andersen as Stanley's Business Associate Harry
261	32	"Victim Four"	Paul Henreid	Talmage Powell	Peggy Ann Garner as Madeline Drake, John Lupton as Ralph Morrow	May 15, 1962
While on their honeymoon by a waterfall, Joe (Comi) and Madeline Drake (Garner) fall after the deck railing breaks, leaving him with a bad leg and her with painful headaches. Later, Joe discovers that Madeline's old boyfriend Ralph Morrow (Lupton), a weapons collector, sent her an expensive wedding present, a silver-handled knife. When Ralph shows up at their house, he openly talks of winning back Madeline from the impoverished Joe. Joe becomes paranoid, as he is worried that Ralph is responsible for a number of butcher knife murders that have occurred in their neighborhood. Ralph and Joe drive around searching for Madeline, pestering an old man (Hines) about being the butcher. They stop by Madeline's workplace, asking her boss Mr. Tuttle (O'Byrne) about her whereabouts. They decide to split up to look for her, with Joe looking eastward and Ralph looking westward. Ralph stops to talk with an annoyed bartender (Booth), while Joe talks with a young man (Stensel) and girl (Hill) embracing. Meanwhile, Madeline is walking home. She hears someone whistling behind her, so she ducks into an alley but is followed. Joe arrives on the scene only to discover Ralph's bloody corpse, with Madeline standing nearby holding Ralph's wedding present, the knife she used to kill him. She confesses to her husband that she thought someone was following her and killed to protect herself. She then admits that it has happened three times before when her headaches struck. Supporting Cast: Paul Comi as Joe Drake, Bryan O'Byrne as Mr. Tuttle, Nesdon Booth as Bartender, Harry Hines as Old Man, Stephanie Hill as Young Girl, Glenn Stensel as Young Man
262	33	"The Opportunity"	Robert Florey	Story by : J.W. Aaron; Teleplay by : Bryce Walton & Henry Slesar	Richard Long as Paul Devore, Coleen Gray as Mrs. Lois Callen	May 22, 1962
Paul Devore (Long) is an unhappily married department store manager. When employee Mrs. Ranwiller (Dunbar) catches thirty-two-year-old mother of two Lois Callen shoplifting an $80 necklace, he hatches an idea. He tells Lois that he will not turn her in for grand theft, nor tell her banker husband, if she agrees to be part of a plan of his. Paul wants a divorce after four years of marriage, but his wife Kate (Sand) refuses to give him one because she doesn't want him to get a nickel, much less half of everything they own through community property law. When Kate leaves on a Sunday trip, he invites Lois over. Lois arrives and discovers the house burglarized, which is really Paul's doing. He hopes that his wife Kate will divorce him now that her treasured possessions are all gone. Paul asks Lois to tie him up, so she does so and leaves. Later Kate arrives and tells Paul how lucky he is that the burglars didn't kill him, after checking to see that all her valuables are gone. Instead of freeing her husband, however, she takes this opportunity to kill him by smothering him with a pillow. Supporting Cast: Rebecca Sand as Kate Devore, Olive Dunbar as Mrs. Ranwiller
263	34	"The Twelve Hour Caper"	John Newland	Story by : Mike Marmer; Teleplay by : Harold Swanton	Dick York as Herbert J. Wiggam	May 29, 1962
Herbert J. Wiggam (York) has worked at an investment firm for Sylvester Tupper (Holmes) for eleven years. Tupper treats his employees, including Wiggam, Lowe (Durant), head cashier Frisbee (Clarke), and Miss Pomfritt (Marshall), like slaves. Tupper shows favoritism to his wife's nephew Lawrence Westbrook (Carlson), who habitually arrives late but receives promotions anyway. Knowing that a $565,000 bond is about to arrive, Wiggam and two other disgruntled employees, Webster (Martin) and Brand (Bellin), decide to steal it. They plan to stage a robbery of that day's bonds, hiding them in the garbage can until the police leave. The plan starts to go awry when the messenger (Losso) is twelve minutes late delivering the bonds. Miss Pomfritt sees the robbers leave, finds Wiggam and Tupper unconscious, and calls the police. Then one of the policemen, Hargis (Wever), knocks over the garbage can containing the bonds, and Wiggam quickly picks up the contents as another policeman (Romano) enters the room. An old cleaning lady (O'Malley) arrives and takes out the trash as Wiggam watches. Later, Wiggam arrives at the airport and the clerk (Reiner) gives him his plane tickets. He is headed for Rio de Janeiro with his mother, who was the cleaning lady. Supporting Cast: Wendell Holmes as Sylvester Tupper, Sarah Marshall as Miss Pomfritt, Gage Clarke as Frisbee, Ned Wever as Hargis, Don Durant as Lowe, Charles Carlson as Lawrence Westbrook, Kreg Martin as Webster, Thomas Bellin (credited as Tom Bellin) as Brand, Andy Romano as 2nd Officer, Lillian O'Malley as The Cleaning Woman
264	35	"The Children of Alda Nuova"	Robert Florey	Robert Wallsten	Jack Carson as Frankie Fane, Christopher Dark as Ainsley Crowder	June 5, 1962
Frankie Fane (Carson) is an American gangster hiding from United States law enforcement in Italy, yet he is frustrated that a local waiter (Padula) cannot understand English and serves no bourbon. He is wanted by U.S. officials because he used to sell drugs to schoolchildren. At the suggestion of an American tourist and archaeology doctoral student named Ainsley Crowder (Dark), Frankie visits some tourist sites outside Rome, including an old Etruscan town named Alda Antica, where Crowder says that tourists never go. While on a tour, he gets unwelcoming leers from a crippled man (Fresco) and an old woman (Vana). He and his shiny rental car attract the interest of local youths, specifically Paolo (Rama), who learned English from American soldiers in the Second World War. He takes Paolo, Gina (Cummins), and Giulio (Cavaleri) for a ride, and they take Frankie to a deep pit where their cousin Cesare (Giarusso) and other children hang out. They rob him of his gold-plated and inscribed cigarette case for his cigarettes and Frankie accidentally knocks Cesare unconscious. The children turn angry and then toss him into the deep pit to slowly die. The Department of Justice, meanwhile, have tracked Fane to Rome, and requests that Italian police, under the authority of Italian investigator Siani (Schnabel), locate the fugitive. Siani enlists Crowder's help, and they manage to trace Frankie to the village, where they question an old man (Tricoli), the crippled man, and the old woman, who all lie. They question the children, but the children lie as well, stating that the new items that they possess are from relatives. Crowder notices the rental car license plate in the pit, but no other specific evidence surfaces. When they discover that he has vanished, they decide to give up the search, thinking that justice has not been served, as Schnabel says that a whole village cannot be punished if there was any wrongdoing anyway. Siani tells Crowder that Fane was wanted for selling drugs to a particular kind of client: children and teenagers. Supporting Cast: Stefan Schnabel as Siani, Thano Rama as Paolo, Christy Cummins as Gina, Raymond Cavaleri as Giulio, Raymond Giarusso as Cesare, Vicente Padula (credited as Vincent Padula) as Waiter, David Fresco as Crippled Man, Lidia Vana as Old Woman, Carlo Tricoli as Village Man
265	36	"First Class Honeymoon"	Don Weis	Henry Slesar	Robert Webber as Edward Gibson, Jeremy Slate as Carl Seabrook	June 12, 1962
Edward Gibson (Webber), a recent divorcee after two years of marriage, must make alimony payments of $2000 every month, but he is content to have his freedom and beloved baseball-loving maid Mrs. Phalen (Bennett). One day, an art gallery owner, Abner Munro (Abbott), arrives at his house to present him with a portrait of his ex-wife Gloria that she had previously commissioned for $2500. Edward throws him out without paying him, but Munro leaves the painting, saying that Edward still has to pay. Later, friend Carl Seabrook (Slate) arrives and tells Edward that he will marry his ex-wife, whom he has been romancing, if Edward gives him $10,000. If Gloria is married, Edward will not have to pay alimony any longer, so he accepts the offer and pays Carl $5000 upfront. Later that day, Edward heads over to his ex-wife's house. He wants to give her the painting as a wedding gift. At his ex-wife's apartment building, he learns from the doorman Tony (Flavin) that she died of a heart attack earlier that morning, and that Carl was with her at the time. It was only after Gibson's ex-wife died that Carl approached him with his offer. Cheated out of $5000, Edward angrily calls Carl, only to be told by his maid (Hamilton) that he has left town for a first-class honeymoon with his own stunning new wife Marian (Martone). Supporting Cast: John Abbott as Mr. Abner Munro, Elaine Martone as Marian Seabrook, James Flavin as Tony the Doorman, Kim Hamilton as Maid, Marjorie Bennett as Mrs. Phalen the Maid (uncredited)
266	37	"The Big Kick"	Alan Crosland, Jr.	Robert Bloch	Anne Helm as Judy, Wayne Rogers as Kenneth	June 19, 1962
Mitch (Hutton) and Judy (Helm) are out-of-work beatniks in need of money who annoy their landlady (Morris) greatly, especially as they owe back rent. At a party held by Bruce (Vaughn), several friends, including Kong (Clark), Monk (Bellin), Connie (Conaway), and Linda (Wasson), congregate for poetry and food. There, Judy meets an older man named Kenneth (Rogers), who is an assistant professor. Kenneth is not a beatnik, but he likes to attend their parties and is considered "loaded" by the others. He asks Judy on a date, and Mitch encourages Judy, who is reluctant, to date Kenneth because he seems to have money. Mitch tells Judy that Kenneth only wants a "small kick", whereas they have "big kicks" together. Kenneth gives Judy a diamond bracelet worth thousands of dollars, which Mitch convinces Judy to give him and tries to sell to a jeweler (Andersen). The jeweler has Mitch arrested as the bracelet Kenneth gave to Judy was, in fact, stolen. With Mitch in prison, Kenneth, a beatnik-hater who believes that they only want to abandon responsibility, pulls out a butcher knife, preparatory to killing Judy, which will give HIM the biggest kick of all. Supporting Cast: Brian G. Hutton as Mitch, Rees Vaughn as Bruce, Martin Clark as Kong, Thomas Bellin as Monk, Jan Conaway as Connie, Susanne Wasson as Linda, Frances Morris as Landlady, Bruce Andersen as Jewelry Clerk
267	38	"Where Beauty Lies"	Robert Florey	Story by : Henry Farrell; Teleplay by : James P. Cavanagh	Cloris Leachman as Caroline Hardy, George Nader as Collin Hardy	June 26, 1962
Thirty-seven-year-old Caroline Hardy (Leachman) keeps house for her famous thirty-five-year-old brother, the renowned theatre actor Collin Hardy (Nader), while she works to have a relationship with married Paul Ross (Carlson). Paul's wife Julie (Clark) catches them together and orders Paul home with her, and it is quickly revealed that Collin contacted Julie to catch Caroline and Paul together. Disappointed in her own life, Caroline seeks escape by increasing her involvement in her brother's career, as she is intensely jealous of Collin's physical attractiveness and her supposed plainness. When Caroline learns through subterfuge that Collin's girlfriend, Joan Blake (Curran), will be joining him in their acting troupe's out-of-town rehearsals to Boston, Caroline hatches a plot while in a jealous rage. The result of that rage is an explosion of house painting fluids, as a painter (Leavitt) is helping her redecorate the house's walls. The doctor (Bailey) tells her that Collin is rendered blind. Caroline, somewhat inauthentically, tries to act the part of the comforter, encouraging her extremely depressed brother not to dwell on the supposed loss of his good looks and opportunities to serve as a leading man. She fails to tell him that his face was not damaged, only the vision of his eyes. Supporting Cast: Raymond Bailey as The Doctor, Pamela Curran as Joan Blake, Marilyn Clark as Julie Ross, Charles Carlson as Paul Ross, Norman Leavitt as The Painter
268	39	"The Sorcerer's Apprentice"	Joseph Lejtes	Robert Bloch	Brandon deWilde as Hugo, Diana Dors as Irene Sadini	Unaired in network run
Hugo (De Wilde) is a mentally challenged boy without a home, and he is taken in by a kind carnival magician Sadini (Stewart) after Sadini finds him sleeping near a trash can. Hugo escaped from a home and regularly sleeps under bridges. When Hugo awakes, he believes that he is dead, as he hasn't eaten in two days, and believes that Sadini's deceitful and unfaithful wife, Irene (Dors), is an angel. He also initially believes that Sadini is the devil as well. Irene performs in her husband's act as the woman whose body is, supposedly, sawed in half. Hugo sees Irene embracing performer George (Kert), and Irene manipulates Hugo into killing her husband by telling Hugo that Sadini is really the devil. She is sick of working with Sadini and is upset that Hugo is placed in charge of props. She says she wants to start a new act with Hugo and convinces him that he can perform the "sawing the woman in half trick" because the magic is actually in the wand. Hugo kills Sadini for her by stabbing him with a kitchen knife, but then she backs out on her promise, as George had drunkenly warned him that she was just setting up Hugo for a murder charge. Irene is knocked out while attempting to flee Hugo. He then decides to attempt the trick and ends up actually sawing Irene in half, just as she regains consciousness. Supporting Cast: David J. Stewart as Sadini, Larry Kert as George, Joe Ploski as Show Spectator (uncredited), Johnny Kern as Show Spectator (uncredited), Edwin Rochelle as Show Spectator (uncredited), Joe Garcio as Show Spectator (uncredited), Charles Perry as Show Spectator (uncredited) Note: The actor who played the role of Milt is uncredited and currently unknown. Note: Due to its gruesome nature, this episode was not aired on the show's initial NBC run. It later aired in syndication.
