= A Jury of Her Peers =

- Short story by Susan Glaspell
- Country: United States
- Language: English

Publication
- Published in: Every Week Magazine
- Publication date: March 5, 1917

Chronology
Trifles	—

"A Jury of Her Peers", written in 1917, is a short story by Susan Glaspell, loosely based on the 1900 murder of John Hossack (not to be confused with the famed abolitionist), which Glaspell covered while working as a journalist for the Des Moines Daily News. It is seen as an example of early feminist literature because two female characters are able to solve a mystery that the male characters cannot. They are aided by their knowledge of women's psychology. Glaspell originally wrote the story as a one-act play entitled Trifles for the Provincetown Players in 1916.

The story was adapted into an episode of the 1950s TV series Alfred Hitchcock Presents. It was also adapted into a 30-minute film, starring Diane de Lorian as Mrs. Hale, by Sally Heckel in 1980. The film was nominated for an Academy Award for Best Live Action Short Film.

== Plot summary ==
"A Jury of Her Peers" is about the discovery of and subsequent investigation of John Wright's murder. The story begins on a cold, windy day in fictional Dickson County, with Martha Hale being abruptly called to ride to the scene of Wright's murder. In the buggy is Lewis Hale, her husband; Sheriff Peters, the county sheriff; and Mrs. Peters, the sheriff's wife. She rushes out to join them in the buggy, and the group sets off. They arrive at the crime scene: the Wrights' lonesome-looking house. Immediately, Mrs. Hale exhibits a feeling of guilt for not visiting her friend Minnie Foster after her marriage to Mr. Wright twenty years prior. Once the whole group is safely inside the house, Mr. Hale is asked to describe to the county attorney what he had seen and experienced the day prior.

Despite the serious circumstances, he delivers his story in a long-winded and poorly thought-out manner, tendencies he struggles to avoid throughout: The story begins with Mr. Hale venturing to Mr. Wright's house to convince Wright to get a telephone. Upon entering the house, he finds Mrs. Wright in a delirious state and comes to learn that Mr. Wright has allegedly been strangled.

The women's curious natures and very peculiar attention to minute details allow them to find evidence of Mrs. Wright's guilt and of her provocations and motives. Meanwhile, the men are unable to procure any evidence. The women find the one usable piece of evidence: a dead bird in a box. It's stated that Minnie used to love to sing, but her husband didn't allow her to, so instead, she brought a bird who sang instead. But now finding her bird dead with a broken neck, it is evident that Mr. Wright killed the bird, leading Mrs. Wright to strangle her husband in a similar manner. Mrs. Hale and Mrs. Peters use their knowledge and experience as two "midwestern rural women" to understand Mrs. Wright's suffering when the only living thing around her has died. The women find justification in Mrs. Wright’s actions and go about hiding what they find from the men. In the end, their obstruction of evidence will seemingly prevent a conviction.

== Themes ==
Scholars have stated that themes covered in Susan Glaspell's A Jury of Her Peers explore the concepts of good and bad, law vs justice, and the world of men vs the world of women. Scholar Leonard Mustazza has stated that in the story Glaspell explores the concept of good and bad in her writing by making the detectives out to be typical heroes of justice via their stating that they wouldn't rest until they find the murderer of John Wright. J. Madison Davis has commented on the same concept, noting that while the women's actions were not conventionally good, the cruelty inflicted by John Wright and the sheriff's choice to ignore this cruelty justify their actions and silence. Mustazza has commented on the topic of law versus justice, noting that the male characters were focused on following the law while the female characters were trying to pursue justice. He further wrote that the men's behaviors showed the differences between the characters, as they didn't acknowledge the abuse the wife suffered and instead criticized her housekeeping skills.
