= Fidelity (novel) =

1915 novel by Susan Glaspell

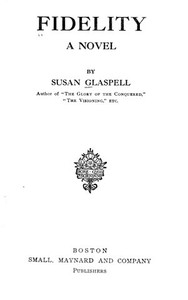
- Author: Susan Glaspell
- Language: English
- Genre: Novel
- Published: 1915
- Publisher: Small, Maynard and Company
- Publication place: United States

Fidelity is a novel written by author Susan Glaspell (1876–1948). The novel was first published in Boston, in 1915, by Small, Maynard & Company. The story revolves around the life experiences of Ruth Holland, a young woman from a Midwestern town called Freeport, Iowa, who defies the societal mandates of her times when she falls in love with a married man and runs away to Colorado with him. When she returns to her hometown after 11 years, she has to deal with the death of her father, the break-up of her family, and the rejection of her loved ones.

Although the novel was not well-received by critics when it was originally published, later reviews have been more positive, with Marcia Noe's Susan Glaspell: Voice from the Heartland proclaiming it to be Glaspell's best novel.

== Structure ==
The novel is structured around 'moments of suspense and disclosure', and moves between past and present events and between the main story and subsidiary plots. Complex moral issues are looked at from multiple perspectives. The ambiguity of Ruth's dilemma is reflected in the use of the technique of shifting points of view originated by the psychologist William James. Glaspell sheds light on her subjects with various 'lamps', in the sense that different characters present their own standings regarding the concept of fidelity.

== Plot and theme ==
Fidelity is the third novel by Susan Glaspell and it elaborates on the concept of woman’s fidelity to marriage, men, society, family and especially to herself. For the plot, Glaspell got inspiration from her own life experience and mainly based on the relationship she had with George Cram Cook, who was married by the time they met and could not marry Glaspell until he got his divorce.

The novel deals with Glaspell's major themes: the controversial relationship between women and society, and the conflicts arising from the clash between women's longing for freedom and their need to be part of a community or family that seek to suppress them. Ruth Holland, Glaspell's main character, is a fiery woman who struggles to become a new woman and to detach herself from the binary gender images advocated by the patriarchal society she lives in. She has to face the consequences of her doings and struggles to decide whether she has been unfaithful to society's demands or faithful to her needs and desires. According to Barbara Ozieblo Rajkowska, author of Susan Glaspell: A Critical Biography, Glaspell exposes moral issues in multiple perspectives, not just as contests between good and evil. In her novel, Glaspell deconstructs the romantic myths of love and marriage. Fidelity serves as commentary on what Glaspell saw as a middle-class society that prioritizes marriage as the ultimate goal, and shows that romantic love cannot be expected to fulfill everyone's existences.
