= The Outside (play) =

Play by Susan Glaspell

The Outside (1917) is the shortest play by Susan Glaspell. It is a play in one act. She uses symbolism to convey the emptiness of Mrs. Patrick’s life on the outside. Glaspell uses the imagery of the station and the areas beyond to show that Mrs. Patrick is keeping herself away from the things she once knew. Glaspell’s use of symbolism aides the characters onstage as well as the audience in realizing the situation the women are facing.

The play was first performed by the Provincetown Players at the Playwrights' Theatre, December 28, 1917. It was revived in 1997 and 2008 by the Orange Tree Theatre in Richmond, London. The Outside was directed by Svetlana Dimcovic in 2008, a graduate of the trainee director bursary at the Orange Tree Theatre 2001-2002.

== Characters ==
- Captain, of 'The Bars' Life-Saving Station
- Bradford, a Life-Saver
- Tony, a Portuguese Life-Saver
- Mrs. Patrick, who lives in the abandoned Station
- Allie Mayo, who works for her

== Plot ==
The plot centers on two women, Mrs. Patrick and Allie Mayo, who have exiled themselves from the world because of emotional pain caused by their husbands. Allie Mayo has refused to say an “unnecessary word” since the death of her husband. Mrs. Patrick has returned to the place that she and her husband used to visit and had talked of buying to bury the things that hurt her. The main action of the play takes place in an abandoned life-saving station that Mrs. Patrick has recently bought, on the cape, in Provincetown, Massachusetts. Three men, Bradford, Tony, and the Captain, fight to save a man who has drowned at their old station, now the house of Mrs. Patrick. The men have brought the victim to this place because of convenience, since the body was found only forty feet from the house, and out of habit, since they used to work from this location. At the end, it is Allie who tries to save Mrs. Patrick from the life that she wants.

== Sources and further reading ==
- Ben-Zvi, Linda (April 28, 2005). Susan Glaspell: Her Life and Times. Oxford University Press. ISBN 978-0-19-535409-6.
- Gainor, J. Ellen (March 25, 2010). Susan Glaspell in Context: American Theater, Culture, and Politics, 1915-48. University of Michigan Press. ISBN 978-0-472-02554-1.
- Glaspell, Susan (1916). Trifles. Frank Shay.
- Waterman, Arthur E. (1966). Susan Glaspell. Twayne Publishers. ISBN 978-0-8290-0016-0.
