= Inheritors (play) =

Play written by Susan Glaspell

Inheritors is a four-act play written by the American dramatist Susan Glaspell, first performed in 1921 (105 years ago).

The play concerns the legacy of an idealistic farmer who wills his highly coveted midwest farmland to the establishment of a college (Act I). Forty years later, when his granddaughter stands up for the rights of Hindu nationals to protest at the college her grandfather founded, she jeopardizes funding for the college itself and sets herself against her own uncle, the president of the institution's trustees (Act II and III). Ultimately, she defies her family's wishes, and as a consequence is bound for prison herself (Act IV).

The play was a defense of free speech and an individual's ability to stand for his or her own ideal during a time of aggressive anti-Communist politics in the US.

Inheritors was first performed at Provincetown Playhouse on April 27, 1921. It was revived in New York City by Mirror Repertory in 1983 and Metropolitan Playhouse in 2005 and was also performed at the Orange Tree Theatre in Richmond, London in 1997.
