= Metropolitan Playhouse =

Theater in New York City

Coordinates: 40°43′24.5″N 73°59′0.3″W

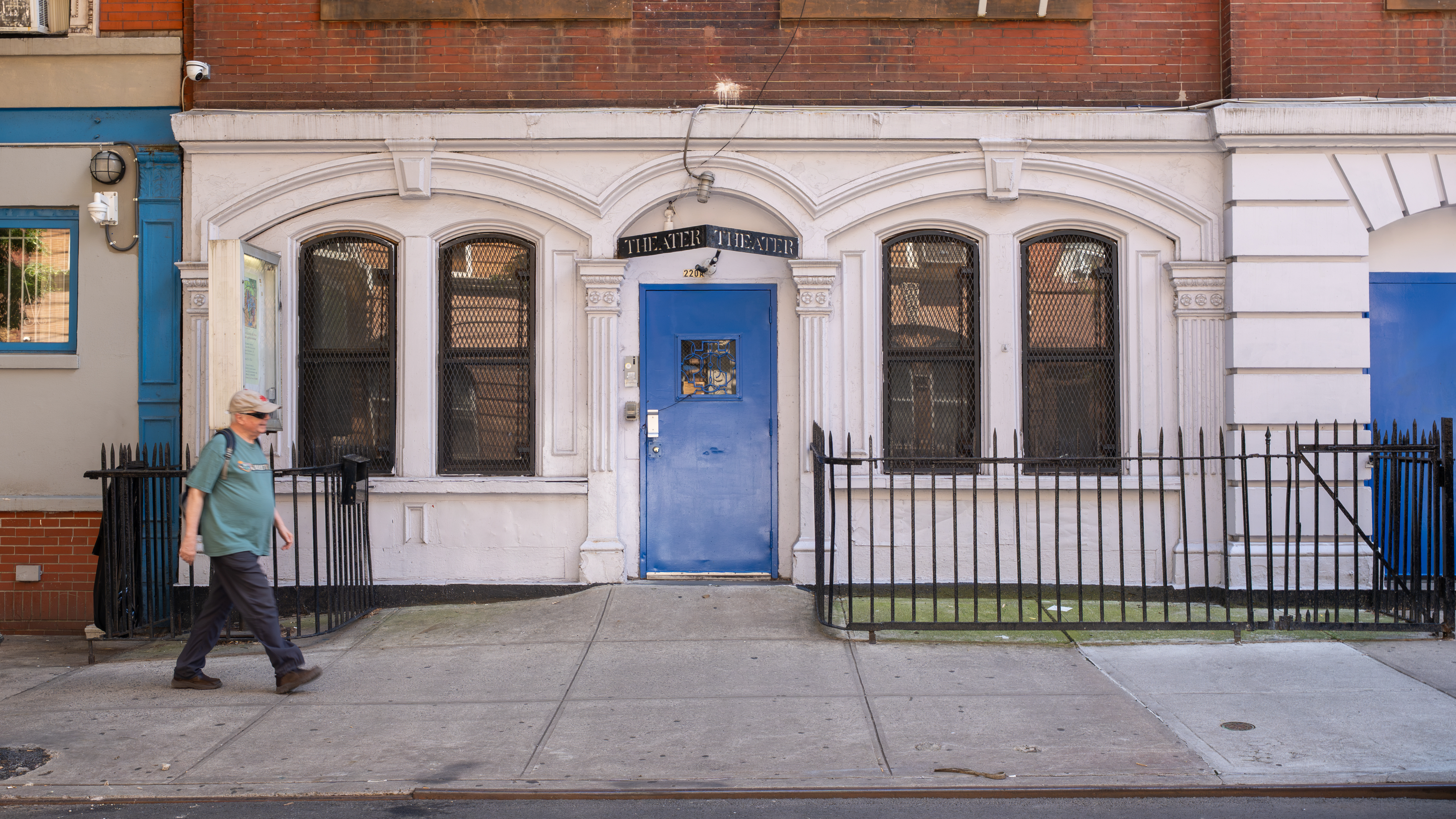
Metropolitan Playhouse

The Metropolitan Playhouse was a resident producing theater in New York City founded in 1992 by Parsifal's Productions, Inc.

Originally producing in the auditorium of The High School for Graphic Communication Arts on W. 49th Street, the theater relocated to East Fourth Street in Manhattan's East Village in 1997 where it presented plays through June 2023. Devoted to presenting plays that explore American culture and history, including seldom-produced, "lost" American plays and new plays about or derived from American history and literature, its best known revivals included three Eulalie Spence one-acts (The Starter, Hot Stuff, and The Hunch), Thunder Rock (play) and Shadow of Heroes by Robert Ardrey, On Strivers Row and Walk Hard (play) by Abram Hill, the Pulitzer Prize-winning Icebound and The Detour by Owen Davis, George L. Aiken's adaptation of Uncle Tom's Cabin, Jacob Gordin's The Jewish King Lear (in a translation by Ruth Gay), the world premiere of Neith Boyce's adaptation of H. G. Wells's The Sea Lady, The Faith Healer and The Great Divide by William Vaughn Moody, The Drunkard by W. H. Smith, Inheritors and the Pulitzer Prize winning Alison's House by co-founder of The Provincetown_Playhouse Susan Glaspell, The Melting Pot by Israel Zangwill, The City by Clyde Fitch, Metamora by John Augustus Stone, Sun-Up by Lula Vollmer, and The New York Idea by Langdon Mitchell, and numerous early one-act plays by Eugene O'Neill. The company has also staged three 'Living Newspapers' from the Federal Theater Project: Arthur Arent's Power in 2007, One-Third of a Nation in 2011, and Injunction Granted in 2015.

During the first 15 months of the COVID-19 pandemic shutdown in New York, the playhouse presented weekly readings online of American plays and short stories, as well as occasional concerts and improvised performance including the work of Zero Boy, the Area 9 Quartet, Amanda Selwyn Dance, all as a part of its Virtual Playhouse series. Further on-line presentations included fund-raising readings of The Moon is Down (play) by John Steinbeck and Love Letters from the Cold War by Joseph Ryan.

Metropolitan Playhouse was awarded an Obie grant by the Village Voice in 2011 for, in the words spoken by presenter Patina Miller ″helping us see, theatrically, where we’ve been and where we are.″ The theater also received a Performing Arts award from the Metropolitan Chapter of the Victorian Society in 2014.

Parsifal's Productions and Metropolitan have been led by Producing Artistic Director Alex Roe since 2001.

== East Village Theater Festival ==
In addition to historical American performance, Metropolitan Playhouse also dedicated itself to the exploration and celebration of the neighborhood in which it resided. The annual East Side Stories Festival (alternately known as the East Village Theater Festival) included one or both of the theater's new works series: East Village Chronicles, a collection of new short plays inspired by the history and lore of the East Village, and Alphabet City, a collection of solo performance pieces derived from interviews with neighborhood residents. In addition to these two performance series, East Side Stories featured readings of other plays, gallery presentations by local artists, and panel discussions of issues facing the neighborhood in the past and present.
