= Trifles (play) =

One-act play by Susan Glaspell

Trifles is a one-act play by Susan Glaspell. It was first performed by the Provincetown Players at the Wharf Theatre in Provincetown, Massachusetts, on August 8, 1916. In the original performance, Glaspell played the role of Mrs. Hale. The play is frequently anthologized in American literature textbooks. Written during the first wave feminist movement, the play contrasts how women act in public and in private as well as how they perform in front of other women versus how they perform in front of men.

== Background ==
The play is loosely based on the murder of John Hossack, which Glaspell reported on while working as a journalist for the Des Moines Daily News. On December 2, 1900, Hossack's wife, Margaret, reported to the police that an unknown person broke into their house and murdered John with an axe while she slept next to him. Margaret was arrested for the murder a few days later at John's funeral. Glaspell followed the story closely and reported on its development, filing a total of twenty-six stories on the case over the course of Hossack's arrest and trial. Initially, Glaspell's reporting painted a rich portrait of Hossack as a formidable, cold-blooded woman, thoroughly capable of "having beaten [her husband's] brains out with an axe". However, after Glaspell visited the Hossack family farmhouse to gather materials for her next column, her tone shifted considerably. Subsequent reports from Glaspell showed Hossack under a much more sympathetic light as a meek woman who missed her children.

In her article on the inspiration for Trifles, Linda Ben-Zvi writes, "It is likely that what caused Glaspell to alter her description was her own visit to the Hossack farm, the event she uses as the basis for Trifles". After Hossack's conviction, Glaspell resigned her position as a journalist to write fiction. In April 1903, Hossack's case was retried. After the jury failed to return a unanimous decision, she was released and able to return home. The lawmen in Trifles are inspired by the original investigators: the County Attorney and the Sheriff. Mr. Hale's character is Glaspell's creation. His name is possibly derived from one of the Indianola farmers who testified at the Hossack trial.

A year after Trifles' success, Glaspell turned the play into a short story, retitling it "A Jury of Her Peers". Glaspell used third-person, limited-omniscient narration to express the point of view of Martha Hale. "A Jury of Her Peers" adds irony by "highlighting the impossibility of women facing such a jury at a time when women were systematically denied the right to be jurors".

Furthermore, Glaspell "capitalized on the growing interest in this form of narrative, a genre that was first popularized in the United States by Edgar Allan Poe". Her dedication to the mystery genre "advances her feminist agenda: all members of the audience, regardless of sex, come to understand each piece of the puzzle through the perspectives of the women sleuths as they grapple the evidence".

== Plot ==
=== Characters ===
George Henderson: The county attorney (originally played by Michael Hulgan)

Henry Peters: Local sheriff and husband of Mrs. Peters (originally played by Robert Conville).

Lewis Hale: Neighbor of the Wrights and husband to Mrs. Hale (originally played by George Cram Cook).

Mrs. Peters: Wife of the sheriff (originally played by Alice Hall).

Mrs. Hale: Neighbor of the Wrights and wife of Lewis Hale (originally played by Susan Glaspell, and later by Kim Base).

John Wright: The murder victim and owner of the house.

Mrs. Minnie Wright: John Wright's wife and his suspected murderer.

=== Summary ===
The play begins "in the now-abandoned farmhouse of John and Minnie Wright". On command from the county attorney, Mr. Hale recounts his visit to the house the previous day. He found Mrs. Wright behaving strangely and her husband upstairs dead, with a rope around his neck. Mr. Hale notes that when he questioned her, Mrs. Wright claimed that she was asleep when someone strangled her husband.

While the three men are searching the house for evidence, "the women begin to explore the domestic space on their own. As they interact with the stage environment, the two women discover clues to the couple's personalities as well as potential evidence in the case".

Although Minnie and John Wright are not physically present they "become vivid figures for us via the dialogue and actions of Mrs. Hale and Mrs. Peters". Through evidence, the wives soon realize that Mr. Wright killed his wife's pet bird, and that led to Mrs. Wright killing her husband. Although the men find no evidence upstairs in the Wright house that would prove Mrs. Wright guilty, the wives piece together that Mrs. Wright acted in anger. They understand how it feels to be oppressed by men.

After the women discover the truth, they hide the dead bird, knowing that it would otherwise be used to make the case against Mrs. Wright. Whether Mrs. Wright is convicted is neither confirmed nor denied at the end of the play.

== Analysis ==
=== Themes ===
Trifles explores the theme of identity through the absence of its key persona: Mrs. Wright. By leaving this character off stage, Glaspell demonstrates how a person's identity is "just as much constructed as innate". The audience can only form their perception of Mrs. Wright through the lens of the on-stage characters as they rehash and discuss her personal life and alleged crime, and these characters may not all perceive Mrs. Wright the same way. The varying perspectives of the group in the farmhouse afford the audience a well-rounded view of Mrs. Wright and how her identity is fluid and changes depending on the prejudices of the other characters.

The power of silence speaks louder than actions in this drama. The theme of powerful silence is portrayed through the dynamic between men and women in the play. The women are mostly silent at the beginning of the play, and their minimal conversation consists mostly of trivial things—at least to the perspective of the men, who believe that their comments and findings to be "trifles;" however, the power in their silence and trivial conversation is implied at the play’s end. Mrs. Hale and Mrs. Peters find the dead canary and decide to hide it from the men. The women’s silence in their knowledge of the canary reflects the social position of women during the specified time period. The men saw their conversation as trivial, which was generally how women were viewed by men in society. The women’s silent solidarity on the topic of the canary reflects their understanding of Minnie’s oppression and the often-diminished role of women in society.

The entrapment of women to the gendered role of domesticity is exemplified throughout the drama. Mrs. Hale and Mrs. Peters are both shown to stay inside the house of Minnie Foster while the men go outside to do their "real work" of investigating this crime. Although women are entrapped into this gendered role, "women's lives are both shaped and empowered under the restrictions of a domestic space". The domestic role in which the women are confined places them in the position to find the canary and solve the investigation. Because they stay inside while the men investigate, the two women find the dead canary and figure out the real meaning behind this murder.

Trailing the portrayal of domestic roles, the portrayal of masculinity is another key element to this drama. The men leave the women inside to discuss “trifles” while they go outside to do the ‘real’ investigation. The play’s title "trifles" emphasizes that the men mock and dismiss women’s concerns. The male characters view the house and the women’s concerns as a physical space with no attached emotion. “Greek writer Xenophon, who insisted that the gods made women for indoors, and man for outdoor pursuits.” Ultimately, as the men diminish the women’s concerns, their ‘trifling’ concerns are what led to them solving the investigation.

Justice is a major theme of Trifles, especially as it pertains to women. The theme could also be viewed as a sort of silent justice. Mrs. Peters and Mrs. Hale both know and understand why Mrs. Wright killed her husband. The title of Glaspell's short story based on Trifles is "A Jury of Her Peers," which refers to the fact that women were not allowed to serve on a jury at this time. Because of this aspect, a truly fair trial by a jury of one's peers, as promised by the American Constitution, was impossible for a female defendant. The biggest irony of justice in Trifles is that a woman's social situation, exacerbated by patriarchal culture, may lead a woman to crime and then unjustly punish her for it. The play draws a clear line between the legal definition of justice, which would mean Mrs. Wright being convicted and sentenced for killing her husband, and the moral definition of justice, which would mean Mrs. Wright is not punished for freeing herself from her abuser. With Trifles, Glaspell paints a picture of the life of Minnie Wright, Margaret Hossack, and the countless women whose experiences were not represented in court because their lives were not deemed relevant to the adjudication of their cases. Mrs. Peters and Mrs. Hale "try Minnie Wright in an alternative venue, using a process that reveals details of her experience and possible motives—aspects of the case that the men's investigation will never discover." Although the play ends without a legitimate verdict, it is valid to assume that the woman reached their own verdict, leaving the audience to decide who the victim is. Glaspell, "like many other writers of mysteries...uses amateur detectives—the two women—who turn out to be more perceptive than the male experts investigating the case." Overall, Glaspell "made important contributions to the development of American Modernism, and her writing reflects a forceful commitment to the country's foundational principles of democracy and personal liberty."

The theme of guilt is presented in Trifles as Mrs. Hale dwells on the idea that she could have come over or spoken more to Minnie Foster. She harbors guilt that she could have prevented this path of destruction. This idea can be seen when Mrs. Hale states, "I wish I had come over sometimes when she was here. I—(looking around the room)—wish I had". Mrs. Hale shows the guilt of not listening to some of the struggles that Minnie Foster might have had, as she understands the hardships that Minnie may have gone through as a woman in this time period. Mrs. Hale expresses "guilt that initially motivates [her] reiterated wish that nothing be revealed to worsen Mrs. Wright's position".

=== Symbols ===
The quilt is a subtle but complex symbol of Mrs. Wright's struggle in her marriage. Mrs. Wright couldn't physically escape being held hostage in this house by Mr. Wright. The "log cabin" quilt pattern that Mrs. Wright was following traditionally includes a red square in the middle, symbolizing a hearth, the center of a warm and inviting home built against a harsh landscape. Through this pattern, Mrs. Wright was attempting to construct a warm and peaceful life which contrasts her abusive reality. The only way Mrs. Wright could have a peaceful life was by murdering her husband and going to jail. Mrs. Hale and Mrs. Peters notice that while most of the stitching is neat and skillful, some parts of it are "all over the place". This shows the first indication that something was amiss- in other words, the missing piece of evidence that the men were searching for upstairs. Mrs. Hale begins to unravel the haphazard stitching, claiming "Bad sewing always made me fidgety." In reality, this is the first act of covering up evidence that the two women partake in. The piecing of the quilt also symbolizes the communicative nature of quilting, as the two women use the quilt to interpret Mrs. Wright's story "patch by patch."

Mrs. Hale and Mrs. Peters deduce that Mrs. Wright had intended to "knot" the quilt. This knot is significant because it alludes to the knot on the noose that Mrs. Wright placed around Mr. Wright's neck. In addition, having the words "knot it" as the last spoken lines hints at this meaning, and gives a firm finality to the women's decision to protect Mrs. Wright and keep their found evidence hidden. The men on the crime scene take this idea of knotting the quilt as a mere mistake in Mrs. Wright's quilting technique. It also symbolizes the domestic sphere of the house, as it is a specific, technical term for quilting that the men are ignorant of. This underlines the validity of the female experience, in contrast to its dismissal as "trifles" by the men.

The canary symbolizes Mrs. Wright, who Mrs. Hale recalls used to sing herself. Mrs. Hale and Mrs. Peters find the dead canary hidden in Mrs. Wright's things and realize that Mr. Wright strangled it. The deceased canary signifies Mr. Wright's silencing of Mrs. Wright, who was cut off from the community and prevented from having contact to the world outside their farmhouse. He killed her bird who represented her singing and joy, therefore she killed him. The discovery of the dead canary triggers childhood memories for Mrs. Peters, who until this point had resisted taking sides, but now seems to join Mrs. Hale in a silent agreement to protect Mrs. Wright, The canary symbolizes, "female helplessness in front of male brutality".

The rocking chair serves as a presence for Mrs. Wright since she is never actually present throughout the play. The audience is reminded that she lived in that house and her presence is still there. Her absence forces the audience to consider her situation rather than judging her as a person or presence. By representing Mrs. Wright as an empty chair, Glaspell allows the audience to easily put themselves in her place.

The jar of preserves symbolizes Mrs. Wright's relationship with her husband. After her arrest, the jar has frozen and burst because of the coldness of the untended, empty farmhouse. This echoes the lack of warmth in Mrs. Wright's life, whose isolation and abuse caused her to "explode" and murder her husband. Similar to being under the pressure of constant isolation and coldness as the jars the only way Mrs. Wright could escape was by bursting. This comparison is a "reminder of the causal relationship between isolation and violence."

The home that Mr. and Mrs. Wright live in is a symbol of confinement and hostage. While a home is supposed to be a place of peace and comfort, it was a cage of terror for Mrs. Wright. Critic Yi-Chin Shin claims that the Wright "home is a good example to show how a home is a place for psychological and physical abuse for many women. Minnie was restricted within her home without a social life and that is considered psychological abuse".

=== Feminism ===
Trifles is seen as an example of early feminist drama.

"Feminism as a theme should not be understood as simply a call for women's rights on the part of the playwright or her characters. Rather, it may be a statement about feminine consciousness, the feelings and perceptions associated with a female character's identity of a woman".

The two female characters, Mrs. Peters and Mrs. Hale are able to sympathize with Mrs. Wright and understand her possible motive leading them to hide the evidence against her. The men, meanwhile, are blinded by their cold, emotionless investigation of material facts.

"[Mrs. Hale] regrets not visiting 'Minnie Foster'" to possibly help Mrs. Wright with her situation and prevent the "desperation that led to the murder" because both women are going through similar situations of their own.

The two women, having pieced together the murder, face the moral dilemma of telling the men about the motive or protecting Mrs. Wright, whom they see as a victim. Their choice raises questions about solidarity among women, the meaning of justice, and the role of women in society as a source of justice.

In Trifles, women and men view the nature of Mrs. Wright's crime very differently. The men in this play are blind to the emotional abuse that she went through from her husband. When the play was first published, women were not allowed to vote, serve as legislators, judges, or be on a jury. In America, the sixth amendment states that the accused are allowed to have a jury of their peers, in 1917 America, if a woman committed a crime and had to go to trial; she would not be surrounded by her peers. However, in this instance, the women act as Mrs. Wright's unofficial jury in the kitchen. The women find evidence of abuse and realize that is why Mrs. Wright killed her husband. They end up hiding the evidence.

The role reversal of Mrs. Peters acting as the sheriff and investigator, her husband's job, shows that women are able to act on their own volition and that women do not belong to their husband. Her investigation turns up different leads than her husband which shows that "her decisions [are] not necessarily coinciding with her husband's or with the male hegemony".

Taking an analytical approach based on developmental psychology, Phyllis Mael writes that the moral development of women differs from those of men. A woman's moral judgement is "tied to feelings of empathy and compassion", whereas a man's moral judgement is "impersonal" and "independent of its emotional origins".

== Adaptations ==
This play was adapted by James P. Cavanagh for an episode of Alfred Hitchcock Presents, which first aired on December 26, 1961, with the alternate title "A Jury of Her Peers" which was directed by Robert Florey. Its cast included Ann Harding, Philip Bourneuf, Frances Reid, Robert Bray, June Walker, and Ray Teal. Hitchcock added his usual disclaimer at the end, stating that the killer and her "accomplices" were caught and convicted.

Susan Glaspell's adaptation "A Jury of Her Peers" is a story version of her play Trifles. This short story is similar to Trifles.

Trifles, a chamber opera in one act, premiered in Berkeley, California, at the Live Oak Theatre on June 17 and 19, 2010. It was composed by John G. Bilotta and its libretto was written by John F. McGrew. The chamber opera is scored for five singers and six instruments, including a piano, and it requires some basic stage props. As in the play, the central figures (Mr. and Mrs. Wright) are absent from the cast of characters. Instead, through the libretto, Lewis Hale reenacts the events surrounding the discovery of Mr. Wright's murder, where he was present.

The 1916 production of Trifles by the Washington Square Players at the Comedy Theater included Marjorie Vonnegut as Mrs. Peters, Elinor M. Cox as Mrs. Hale, John King as Lewis Hale, Arthur E. Hohl as Henry Peters, and T.W. Gibson as George Henderson. The production opened on August 30, 1916 in Manhattan, New York City.

== Bibliography ==
- Alkalay-Gut, Karen (Winter 1984). "Jury of Her Peers: The Importance of Trifles". Studies in Short Fiction. 21 (1). Newberry, South Carolina: 1–10.
- Alkalay-Gut, Karen (1995). "Murder and Marriage: Another Look at Trifles". In Ben-Zvi, Linda (ed.). Susan Glaspell: Essays on Her Theater and Fiction. The University of Michigan Press. pp. 71–81. ISBN 0472105493.
- Angel, Marina (2003). "Teaching Susan Glaspell's A Jury of Her Peers and Trifles". Journal of Legal Education. 53: 548–563.
- Bach, Gerhard. “Susan Glaspell – Provincetown Playwright.” The Great Lakes Review, vol. 4, no. 2, 1978, pp. 31–43. JSTOR 41337535. Accessed 7 May 2020.
- Ben-Zvi, Linda (1992). "'Murder, She Wrote': The Genesis of Susan Glaspell's Trifles" (PDF). Theatre Journal. 44 (2): 141–162. doi:10.2307/3208736. JSTOR 3208736.
- Bourne, Amanda. "Props in Trifles". Literature Uncovered.
- Charters, Ann; Charters, Samuel, eds. (2013). Literature and its Writers: an Introduction to Fiction, Poetry, and Drama. Bedford/Boston/New York: St. Martins.
- Friedman, Sharon (1984). "Feminism as theme in Twentieth Century American Women's Drama". American Studies. 25 (1): 69–89.
- Gainor, J. Ellen (2018). "Susan Glaspell". In Gainor, J. Ellen; Garner, Stanton B. Jr.; Puchner, Martin (eds.). The Norton Anthology of Drama. Vol. 2: The Nineteenth Century to the Present. W.W. Norton & Company. pp. 473–477. ISBN 9780393283488.
- Gümüşçubuk, Karagöz Ö. (2019). "Domestic Space: A Terrain of Empowerment and Entrapment in Susan Glaspell's 'Trifles'". Dokuz Eylul University Journal of Graduate School of Social Sciences. 21 (2): 397–407. doi:10.16953/deusosbil.466714. S2CID 201701410.
- Hedges, Elaine (1995). "Small Things Reconsidered: 'A Jury of Her Peers'". In Ben-Zvi, Linda (ed.). Susan Glaspell: Essays on Her Theater and Fiction. The University of Michigan Press. pp. 49–69. ISBN 0472105493.
- Hinz-Bode, Kristina (2006). Susan Glaspell and the Anxiety of Expression. Jefferson, NC: McFarland & Co. pp. 55–74. ISBN 9780786483709.
- Holstein, Suzy (Spring 2003). "Silent Justice in a Different Key: Glaspell's Trifles". The Midwest Quarterly. 44: 282–290. – via GALILEO (subscription required)
- Mael, Phyllis (1989). "Trifles: The Path to Sisterhood". Literature/Film Quarterly. 17 (4): 281–284.
- Shih, Yi-chin (May 2013). "Place and Gender in Susan Glaspell's Trifles and Woman's Honor" (PDF). Humanitas Taiwanica. 78: 237–255.
