= The Rules of the Institution and Other Stories =

Short story collection by Susan Glaspell

- Author: Susan Glaspell
- Illustrator: Arthur I. Keller; Charlotte Harding
- Language: English
- Genre: Short story
- Published: April 2018
- Publisher: Silvery Books
- Publication place: United States
- Media type: Print and Ebook
- Pages: 302
- ISBN: 978-987-42-7672-8

The Rules of the Institution and Other Stories is a collection of short stories written by Susan Glaspell (1876–1948). This compilation includes nineteen short stories originally published between 1898 and 1916 in early twentieth century magazines. Most of the stories had never been re-published until today. In this edition there are included some of the original illustrations that accompanied the stories when they first appeared, artwork by renowned artists such as Arthur I. Keller, Charlotte Harding, Thomas Fogarty, Walter Biggs and W. Herbert Dunton, among others.

These short stories portray life at the beginning of the 20th century. The majority of Glaspell's leading characters are resolute women—artists, students, workers—, who struggle to break society impositions to fulfill their longings. Short stories such as Contrary to precedent, For tomorrow, At the source, The Rules of the Institution—to name just a few—, with groundbreaking ideas regarding the role of women in society, were probably not duly appreciated after World War I, a time when female domesticity was encouraged. This may be the reason why Glaspell's prolific production was set aside for so many decades. However, since the late nineties, with the reappraisal of women's contributions, there has been a growing interest in her work. Today, Susan Glaspell is considered an early advocate of feminism and one of the most relevant female playwrights of Modernism.

== Contents ==
- The Tragedy of a Mind (1898)
- An Unprofessional Crime (1900)
- The Girl from Down-town (1903)
- The intrusion of the personal (1904)
- Contrary to precedent (1904)
- The Work of the Unloved Libby (1905)
- The Return of Rhoda (1905)
- For Tomorrow. The Story of an Easter Sermon (1905)
- From the Pen of Failure (1905)
- At the Turn of the Road (A Christmas Story.) (1907)
- At the Source (1912)
- A Boarder of Art: How She Changed One Man’s Appetite (1912)
- The Resurrection and the Life (1913)
- Whom Mince Pie Hath Joined Together. The Story of a Starving Girl and a Thanksgiving Dinner in Paris (1913)
- The Rules of the Institution (1913)
- Looking after Clara: What Happened to Mr. Stephen Blatchford When He Decided to Marry (1914)
- The Manager of Crystal Sulphur Springs (1915)
- Agnes of Cape’s End. A complete novel in miniature (1915)
- Unveiling Brenda (1916)
