= Susan Glaspell =

American dramatist

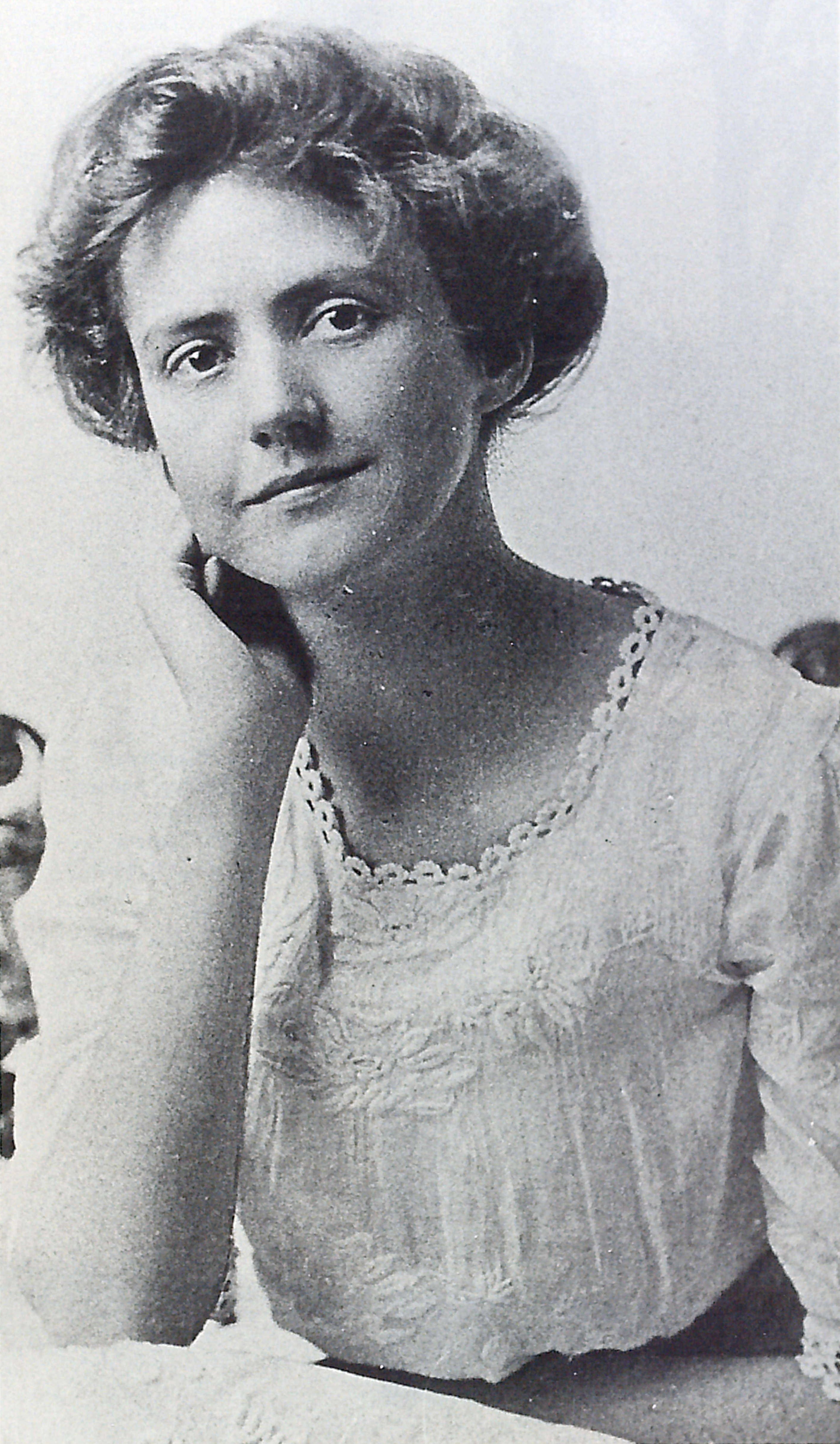
- Glaspell in 1894
- Born: Susan Keating Glaspell; July 1, 1876; Davenport, Iowa, US
- Died: 28 July 1948 (aged 72); Provincetown, Massachusetts, US
- Education: Drake University (BA)
- Spouse(s): George Cram Cook (1913–24†) companion, Norman H. Matson (1924–32)
- Writing career
- Notable works: Alison's House; Trifles ("A Jury of Her Peers")
- Notable awards: Pulitzer Prize for Drama (1931)

Signature
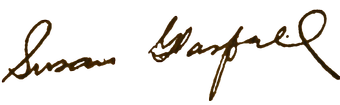

Susan Keating Glaspell (July 1, 1876 – July 28, 1948) was an American playwright, novelist, journalist and actress. With her husband George Cram Cook, she founded the Provincetown Players, the first modern American theatre company.

First known for her short stories (fifty were published), Glaspell also wrote nine novels, fifteen plays, and a biography. Often set in her native Midwest, these semi-autobiographical tales typically explore contemporary social issues, such as gender, ethics, and dissent, while featuring deep, sympathetic characters who make principled stands. Her 1930 play Alison's House earned her the Pulitzer Prize for Drama.

After her husband's death in Greece, she returned to the United States. During the Great Depression, Glaspell worked in Chicago for the Works Progress Administration, where she was Midwest Bureau Director of the Federal Theater Project. Although a best-selling author in her own time, after her death Glaspell attracted less interest and her books went out of print. She was also noted for discovering playwright Eugene O'Neill.

Since the late 20th century, critical reassessment of women's contributions has led to renewed interest in her career and a revival of her reputation. In the early 21st century, Glaspell is today recognized as a pioneering feminist writer and America's first important modern female playwright. Her one-act play Trifles (1916) is frequently cited as one of the greatest works of American theatre. According to Britain's leading theatre critic, Michael Billington, she remains "American drama's best-kept secret."

== Biography ==
=== Early life and career ===
Susan Glaspell was born in Iowa in 1876 to Elmer Glaspell, a hay farmer, and his wife Alice Keating, a public school teacher. She had an older brother, Raymond, and a younger brother, Frank. She was raised on a rural homestead just below the bluffs of the Mississippi River along the western edge of Davenport, Iowa. This property had been bought by her paternal great-grandfather James Glaspell from the federal government following its Black Hawk Purchase. Having a fairly conservative upbringing, "Susie" was remembered as "a precocious child" who would often rescue stray animals. As the family farm increasingly became surrounded by residential development, Glaspell's worldview was still shaped by the pioneer tales of her grandmother. She told of regular visits by Indians to the farm in the years before Iowa statehood. Growing up directly across the river from Black Hawk's ancestral village, Glaspell was also influenced by the Sauk leader's autobiography; he wrote that Americans should be worthy inheritors of the land. In 1891, her father sold the farm, and the family moved into Davenport.

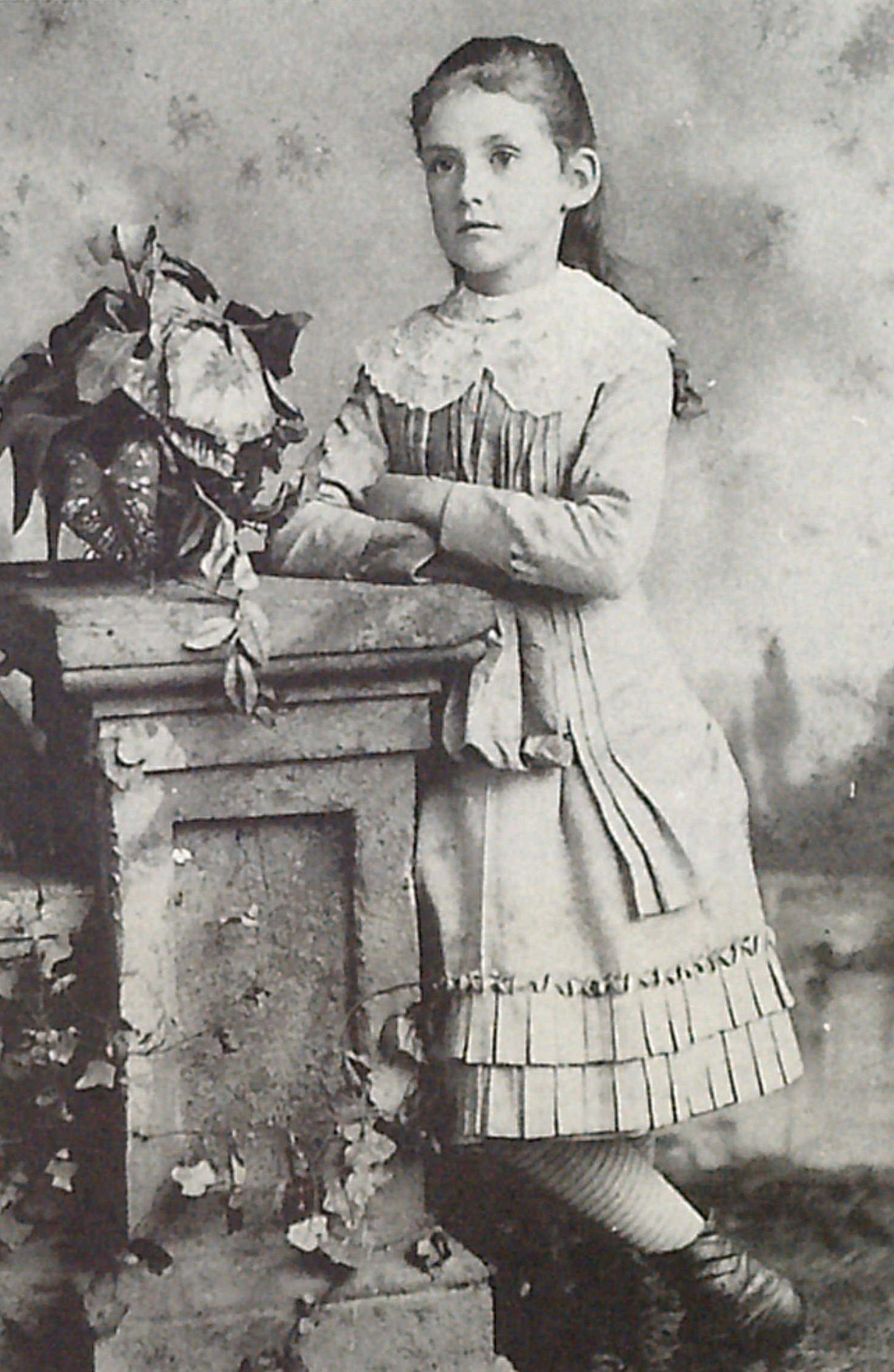
Glaspell, circa 1883.

Glaspell was an accomplished student in the city's public schools, taking an advanced course of study and giving a commencement speech at her 1894 graduation. By eighteen, she was earning a regular salary as a journalist for a local newspaper. By twenty, she wrote a weekly 'Society' column that lampooned Davenport's upper class.

At twenty-one, Glaspell enrolled at Drake University, against the local belief that college made women unfit for marriage. A philosophy major, she excelled in male-dominated debate competitions, winning the right to represent Drake at the state debate tournament her senior year. A Des Moines Daily News article on her graduation ceremony cited Glaspell as "a leader in the social and intellectual life of the university."

The day after graduation, Glaspell began working full-time for the Des Moines paper as a reporter, a rare position for a woman, particularly as she was assigned to cover the state legislature and murder cases. After covering the conviction of a woman accused of murdering her abusive husband, Glaspell abruptly resigned at age twenty-four.

She moved back to Davenport to focus on writing fiction. Unlike many new writers, she readily had her stories accepted and was published by the most widely read periodicals, including Harper's, Munsey's, Ladies' Home Journal, and Woman's Home Companion. It was a golden age of short stories. She used a large cash prize from a short story magazine to finance her move to Chicago, where she wrote her first novel, The Glory of the Conquered, published in 1909. It was a best-seller, and The New York Times declared,

"Unless Susan Glaspell is an assumed name covering that of some already well-known author—and the book has qualities so out of the ordinary in American fiction and so individual that this does not seem likely—The Glory of the Conquered brings forward a new author of fine and notable gifts."

Glaspell published her second novel, The Visioning, in 1911. The New York Times said of the book, "it does prove Miss Glaspell's staying power, her possession of abilities that put her high among the ranks of American storytellers." Her third novel, Fidelity, was published in 1915. The New York Times described it as "a big and real contribution to American novels."

=== Theatre ===
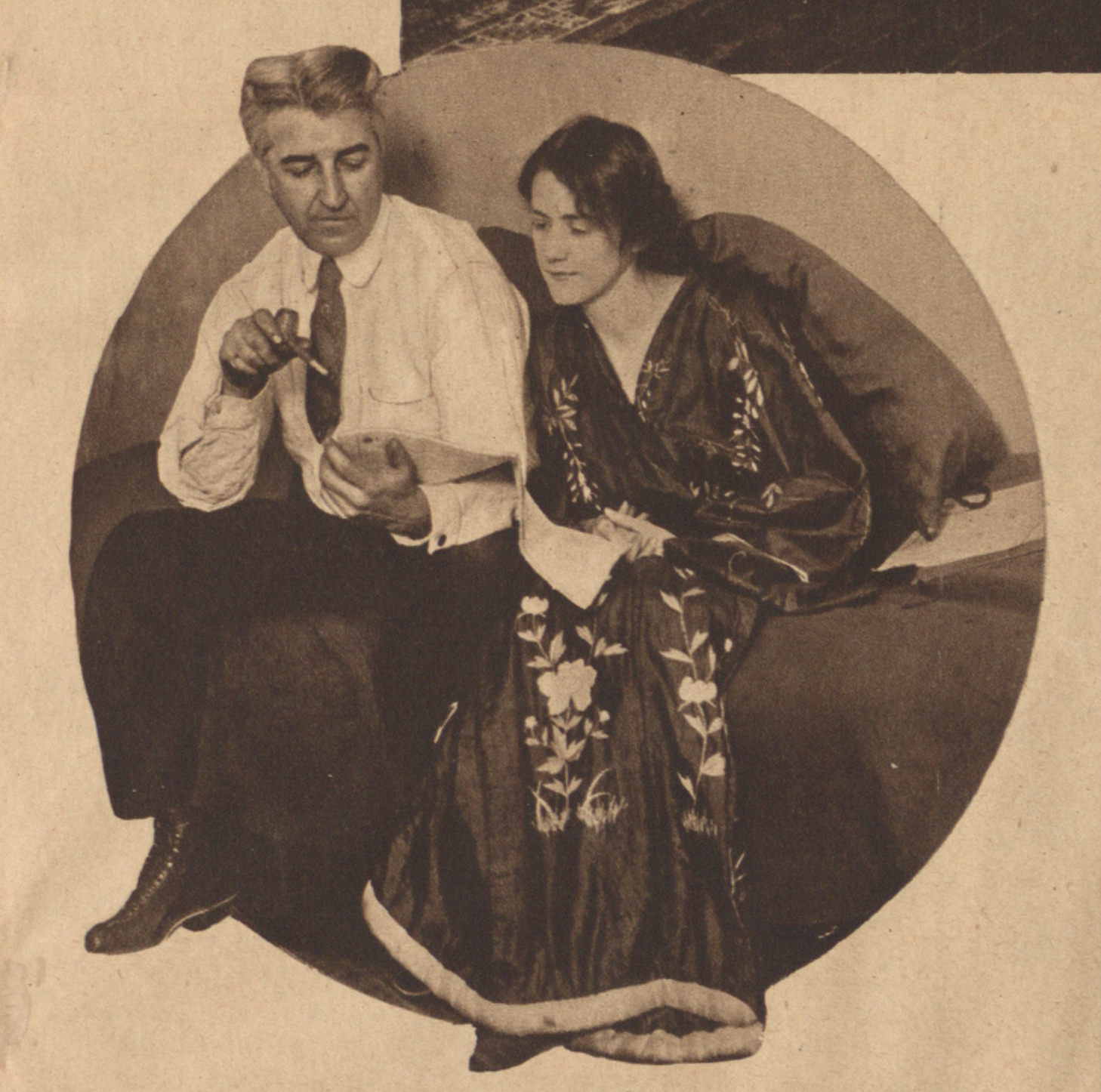
Glaspell and husband George Cram Cook in 1917

While in Davenport, Glaspell associated with other local writers to form the Davenport group. Among them was George Cram Cook, who was teaching English literature at the University of Iowa. He was from a wealthy family and also was a gentleman farmer. Though he was already in his second, troubled marriage, Glaspell fell in love with him. He divorced and they wed in 1913.

To escape Davenport's disapproving gossip and seek a larger artistic world, Glaspell and Cook moved to New York City's Greenwich Village. There they became key participants in America's first avant-garde artistic movement, and associated with many of the era's most well-known social reformers and activists, including Upton Sinclair, Emma Goldman, and John Reed. Glaspell became a leading member of Heterodoxy, an early feminist debating group composed of the premier women's rights crusaders. After a series of miscarriages, she underwent surgery to remove a fibroid tumor.

Along with many others of their artistic circles, Glaspell and Cook went to Provincetown, Massachusetts, on Cape Cod, for the summer of 1915, where they rented a cottage. Although still weak from surgery, Glaspell worked with Cook and friends to start an experimental theatre company, a "creative collective". They produced their first plays in a refurbished fishing wharf arranged for by another member of their group. What became known as the Provincetown Playhouse would be devoted to creating and producing artistic plays to reflect contemporary American issues. The Players rejected the more commercial and escapist melodramas produced on Broadway.

Despite the successes of her earlier fiction, Glaspell would be most remembered for the twelve groundbreaking plays she submitted to the company over the next seven years. Her first play, Trifles (1916), was based on the murder trial she had covered as a young reporter in Des Moines. Today considered an early feminist masterpiece, it was an instant success, riveting audiences with its daring views of justice and morality. It has since become one of the most anthologized works in American theatre history. In 1921 she completed Inheritors; following three generations of a pioneer family, it is perhaps America's first modern historical drama. This same year she also finished The Verge, one of the earliest American works of expressionist art.

Believing an amateur staff would lead to increased innovation, the Provincetown playwrights often participated directly in the production of their own plays. Though untrained, Glaspell received further acclaim as an actress. William Zorach, an early member of the group, reported "she had only to be on the stage and the play and the audience came alive." Jacques Copeau, a legendary French theatre director and critic, was moved to tears by a Glaspell performance. He described her as "a truly great actress."

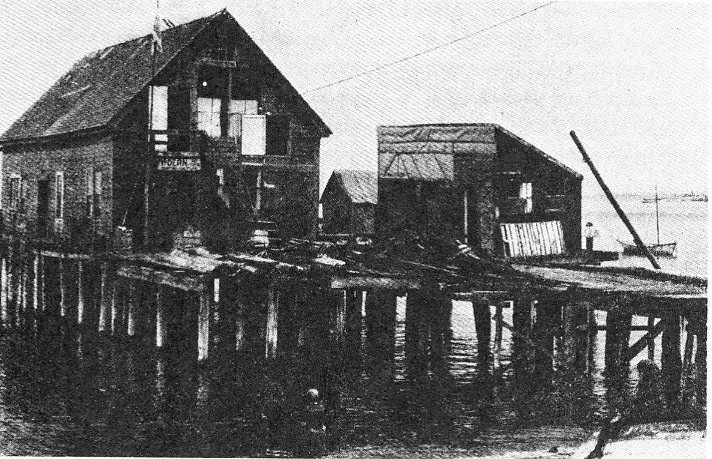
Lewis Wharf

While considering new plays to produce, Glaspell discovered Eugene O'Neill, who would eventually be recognized as one of the greatest playwrights in American history. Other notables associated with the group include Edna St. Vincent Millay, Theodore Dreiser, and Floyd Dell, Glaspell's friend from the Davenport group.

After their first two seasons in Provincetown, the players moved their theater to New York City. As the company became more successful, playwrights began to view it as a means to get picked up by other, more commercial theatre venues, a violation of the group's original purpose.

Cook and Glaspell decided to leave the company they founded, which had become 'too successful'. Glaspell was by now at the height of her theatre career, with her most recent play, The Verge, bringing the most praise. In 1922 Glaspell and Cook moved to Delphi, Greece. Cook died there in 1924 of glanders, an infectious disease he caught from his dog.

From the onset, Glaspell's plays were also published in print form, receiving laudatory reviews by New York's most prestigious periodicals. By 1918 Glaspell was already considered one of America's most significant new playwrights. In 1920, her plays began to be printed in England by the highly reputable British publisher, Small & Maynard. She was even better received there. English critics hailed her as a genius and ranked her above O'Neill. They compared her favorably to Henrik Ibsen, whom they ranked as the most important playwright since Shakespeare. To satisfy demand for Glaspell's writing, a British version of her novel Fidelity was published, going through five editions in five weeks. When Inheritors was produced for England in 1925, every leading newspaper and literary magazine published an extensive review, most unanimous in their praise. The reviewer for the Liverpool Echo claimed, "This play will live when Liverpool is a rubbish heap."

However, the influence and critical success of Glaspell's plays did not translate into financial gain. In order to support herself and her husband during their years with the theater, Glaspell continued to submit short stories to top periodicals for publication. Literary scholars consider the stories from this period to be her finest. It was during her productive time as a playwright that Glaspell also established herself as, in the words of biographer Linda Ben-Zvi, "a central figure in the development of the modern American short story."

=== Later career ===
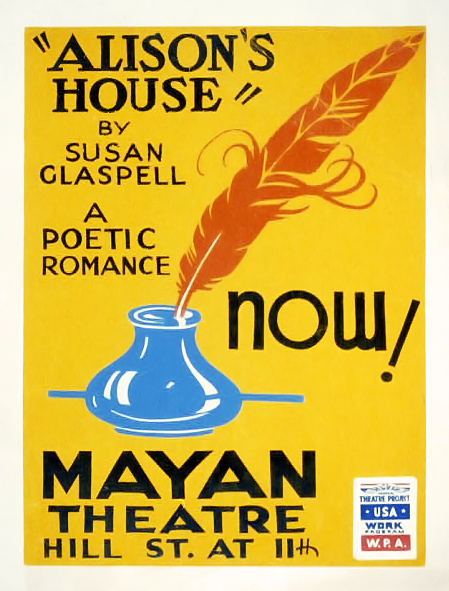
Poster for the 1938 WPA production of Alison's House, for which Glaspell won the Pulitzer Prize for Drama.

Glaspell returned to Cape Cod after Cook's death, where she wrote a well-received biography and tribute to her late husband, The Road to the Temple (1927). During the late twenties, she was romantically involved with the younger writer Norman H. Matson. In this period she wrote three best-selling novels, which she considered personal favorites: Brook Evans (1928), Fugitive's Return (1929), and Ambrose Holt and Family (1931). She also wrote the play Alison's House (1930), for which she was awarded the Pulitzer Prize in 1931. In 1932, Glaspell's relationship with Matson ended after eight years. She fell into her first and only period of low productivity as she struggled with depression, alcoholism, and poor health.

In 1936, Glaspell moved to Chicago after being appointed Midwest Bureau Director of the Federal Theater Project during the Great Depression. Over the next few years, she reconnected with siblings and regained control of her drinking and creativity. Glaspell returned to Cape Cod when her work for the Federal Theater Project was finished. Her years in the Midwest influenced her work. Her last three novels increasingly focused on the region, family life, and theistic questions. They included The Morning is Near Us (1939), Norma Ashe (1942), and Judd Rankin's Daughter (1945).

Susan Glaspell died of viral pneumonia in Provincetown on July 28, 1948.

== Legacy ==
Glaspell was highly regarded in her time, and was well known as a Pulitzer Prize-winning playwright. Her short stories were regularly printed in the era's top periodicals, and her New York Times obituary states that she was "one of the nation's most widely-read novelists."

In 1940, a new generation of influential Broadway-based critics began publishing derogatory reviews of her plays, having a sizable effect on her long-term standing. Exacerbating the issue was Glaspell's reluctance to seek publicity and her tendency to downplay her own accomplishments, perhaps a result of her modest Midwestern upbringing. In addition, Glaspell's idealistic novels of strong and independent female protagonists were less popular in the post-war era, which stressed female domesticity. Her novels fell out of print after her death. Accordingly, in the United States her work was seriously neglected for many years. Internationally, she received some attention by scholars, who were primarily interested in her more experimental work from the Provincetown years.

In the late 1970s, feminist critics began to reevaluate Glaspell's career, and interest in her work has grown steadily ever since. In the early 21st century, Glaspell scholarship is a "burgeoning" field. Several book-length biographies and analyses of her writing have been published by university presses since the late 20th century. After nearly a century of being out of print, a large portion of her work has been republished.

With major achievements in drama, novel, and short fiction, Glaspell is often cited as a "prime example" of an overlooked female writer deserving canonization. Perhaps the originator of modern American theater, Glaspell has been called "the First Lady of American Drama" and "the Mother of American Drama."

In 2003, the International Susan Glaspell Society was founded, with the aim of promoting "the recognition of Susan Glaspell as a major American dramatist and fiction writer." Her plays are frequently performed by college and university theatre departments, but she has become more widely known for her often-anthologized works: the one-act play Trifles, and its short-story adaptation, "A Jury of Her Peers". Since the late 20th century, these two pieces have become staples of theatre and Women's Studies curricula across the United States and the world.

== Recent productions ==
In 1996, the Orange Tree Theatre in Richmond, London, began a long association with the plays of Susan Glaspell. Auriol Smith directed The Verge in 1996, one of the first of many plays by the American playwright to be performed at the theatre. The Mint Theater in New York City produced Alison's House in 1999 under the direction of Linda Ames Key.

The Metropolitan Playhouse, a New York resident theater dedicated to exploring and re-vitalizing American literature and culture, staged Inheritors in 2005; the production was directed by Yvonne Opffer Conybeare.

In his 2008 programmed note for Inheritors, Orange Tree director Sam Walters wrote:

In 1996... I felt we had rediscovered a really important writer. Now, whenever I talk to American students, which I do quite often, I try my 'Glaspell test'. I simply ask them if they have heard of her, and almost always none of them have. Then I mention Trifles, and some realize they have heard of that much-anthologized short play. So even in her own country she is shamefully neglected. And when I type Glaspell on my computer it always wants to change it to Gaskell.

The Ontological Hysteric Incubator Arts project put on two plays by Glaspell, The Verge in 2009, directed by Alice Reagan; and Trifles in 2010, directed by Brooke O'Harra and Brendan Connelly. As of 2013 the theater has produced three of Glaspell's one-act plays and five of her full-length plays, including the first ever production of Glaspell's unpublished final play, Springs Eternal.

In September 2015, celebrating the centenary of Provincetown Players, American Bard Theater Company presented a 12-hour celebration, featuring performances of 10 of Glaspell's plays in a single day.

The San Diego State University School of Theatre, Television, and Film staged two one-act plays by Susan Glaspell in September and October 2018, Trifles (1916) and Woman's Honor (1918) in a production directed by faculty member Randy Reinholz.

== Works ==
=== Drama ===
One-act plays

- Suppressed Desires (1914), co-written with George Cram Cook
- Trifles (1916), adapted as the short story "A Jury of Her Peers" (1917)
- Close the Book (1917)
- The Outside (1917)
- The People (1917)
- Woman's Honor (1918)
- Tickless Time (1918), co-written with George Cram Cook
- Free Laughter (1919), published for the first time in 2010

Full-length plays

- Bernice (1919)
- Inheritors (1921)
- The Verge (1921)
- Chains of Dew (1922), published for the first time in 2010
- The Comic Artist (1927), co-written with Norman Matson
- Alison's House (1930), winner of 1931 Pulitzer Prize for Drama
- Springs Eternal (1943), published for the first time in 2010

=== Fiction ===
Novels

- The Glory of the Conquered (1909)
- The Visioning (1911)
- Fidelity (1915)
- Brook Evans (1928)
- Fugitive's Return (1929)
- Ambrose Holt and Family (1931)
- The Morning Is Near Us (1939)
- Norma Ashe (1942)
- Judd Rankin's Daughter (1945)

Short story collections

- Lifted Masks (1912)
- A Jury of Her Peers (1917)
- Her America: "A Jury of Her Peers" and Other Stories by Susan Glaspell (2010), edited by Patricia L. Bryan & Martha C. Carpentier
- The Rules of the Institution and Other Stories (2018)

=== Other ===
- The Road to the Temple (1926), a biography of George Cram Cook
- Cherished and Shared of Old (1926), a children's book
