= Alison's House =

Play written by Susan Glaspell

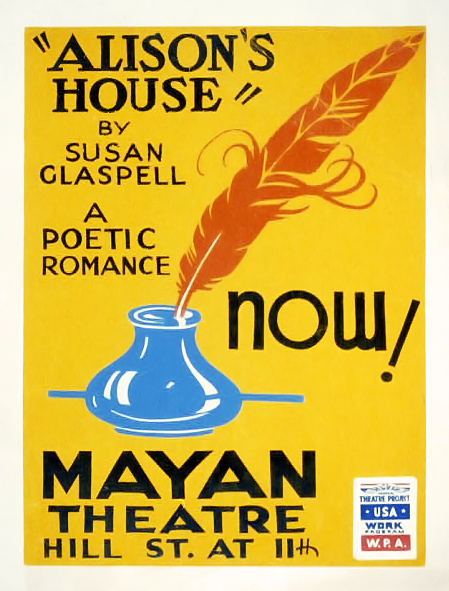
Poster for a Federal Theatre Project production of Alison's House in Los Angeles in 1938

Alison's House is a drama play in three acts by American playwright Susan Glaspell.

It was first produced at Eva Le Gallienne's Civic Repertory Theatre on 14th Street, New York, on 1 December 1930, where it was given 25 performances in the regular repertory season. It was awarded the Pulitzer Prize for Drama in 1931. In May 1931 the production was transferred uptown to the Ritz Theatre, but it received indifferent reviews and closed after two weeks.

It is 18 years since Alison Stanhope, the country's foremost poet, died. Now the house she lived in must be sold, but it holds secrets. Did Alison sacrifice the man she loved for the sake of her family's reputation? And whom do such sacrifices benefit? The play's struggles are set in 1899, on the cusp of the 20th century, in which very different values will come to prevail. Inspired by the life and work of the American poet Emily Dickinson, Glaspell set the play in her native Iowa.
