= George Cram Cook =

American playwright and writer (1873–1924)

- Born: George Cram Cook; October 7, 1873; Davenport, Iowa, United States
- Died: January 11, 1924 (aged 50); Delphi, Greece
- Other name: Jig Cook
- Education: University of Iowa, Harvard
- Occupation: Theatre Producer
- Known for: Provincetown Players
- Spouses: Sara H Swain; Molly Price; Susan Glaspell
- Children: Nilla Cram Cook; Harl Cook

George Cram Cook or Jig Cook (October 7, 1873 – January 14, 1924) was an American theatre producer, director, playwright, novelist, poet, and university professor. Believing it was his personal mission to inspire others, Cook, along with his wife, author Susan Glaspell, led the founding of the Provincetown Players in Cape Cod in 1915; their "creative collective" was considered the first modern American theatre company. During his seven-year tenure with the group, Cook oversaw the production of nearly one-hundred new plays by fifty American playwrights. He is particularly remembered for producing the first plays of Eugene O'Neill, Susan Glaspell, and several other noted writers.

While teaching English literature at the University of Iowa from 1896 to 1899, Cook also taught what is thought to be the first creative writing course. Titled "Verse-Making," the course was continued by Cook's colleagues at the university after he left. It was not until the 1950s that the Iowa Writers Workshop was founded.

== Biography ==
Cook wrote: "I was born and raised in Davenport, Iowa, where my family was one of the town's oldest and most wealthy. My father, a corporate lawyer, strongly encouraged my education from a young age, while my mother instilled in me a passion for culture and the arts. I completed my bachelor's degree at Harvard in 1893." He continued his studies in Europe at the University of Heidelberg in 1894 and at the University of Geneva the following year.

Upon completing these studies, Cook returned to Iowa. He taught English literature and classics at the University of Iowa from 1895 until 1899. He also taught an early creative writing course, which he called "Verse Making". During the 1902 academic year, Cook was an English professor at Stanford University.

It was not until the 1950s that Paul Engle is credited with developing what is considered the world's first creative writing program, the Iowa Writer's Workshop, which has gained renown.

In Davenport, Cook associated with other young writers in what was informally referred to as the Davenport group. Among them was writer Susan Glaspell. He divorced his second wife, Molly Price, with whom he had two children Nilla (b. 1908) and Harlan "Harl" (b. 1910) and he and Glaspell married in 1913.

To escape community gossip and seek larger world for their work, the couple moved to New York City, where they lived in Greenwich Village. In the summer of 1915 they went to Provincetown, Massachusetts for the season, as did many other writers and artists from the Village. Cook was among the founders of the Provincetown Players that year, an important step in the development of American theatre. The group would perform works by Cook and Glaspell, as well as the first plays of Eugene O'Neill and Edna St. Vincent Millay, among others. Cook would lead the Provincetown Players until 1919, at which time he took a sabbatical. Although he returned to the group in 1920, internal wrangling and his own frustration led to his effectively abandoning the cooperative.

== Later years ==
Wife Susan Glaspell with Cook wearing his fustanella. Pictured also is Cook's dog from which he contracted a fatal disease.

In 1922, Cook and his family moved to Greece and James Light succeeded Cook as director of the Provincetown Players. The Cook family lived at Delphi, where they spent the summers camped in spruce huts high above the village on Mount Parnassus. After a short time, Cook began to wear fustanella, the traditional Greek shepherd's attire. In 1924 he contracted a rare infectious disease from his pet dog and died. Cook's obituary appeared on the front page of the New York Times.

He is buried at Delphi in a small cemetery within hundreds of feet of the ruins of the famous Temple of Apollo, home of the oracle. So beloved was Cook by the locals that the Greek government allowed a stone from the temple foundation to be used as his grave marker. Years later his daughter Nilla Cram Cook was buried beside him.

== Partial bibliography ==
Plays

- (1914) Suppressed Desires; co-written with Susan Glaspell.
- (1915) Change Your Style.
- (1918) The Athenian Women.
- (1918) Tickless Time; co-written with Susan Glaspell.
- (1921) The Spring.

Novels

- (1903) Roderick Taliaferro: A Story of Maximilian's Empire.
- (1911) The Chasm.

Poetry

- (1925) Greek Coins; published posthumously with essays by Floyd Dell, Edna Kenton, and Susan Glaspell.

Non-fiction

- (1899) Company B of Davenport.
