= Des Moines Daily News =

American newspaper

- Type: Daily newspaper
- Founded: 1881
- Ceased publication: 1908
- OCLC number: 14771575

Des Moines Daily News was a daily newspaper published in Des Moines, Iowa, between 1881 and 1908.

== Notable people ==
- Ella Hamilton Durley (died 1922), reporter and editorial and special writer
