= The Greenwich Village Bookshop Door =

1920s autograph artwork

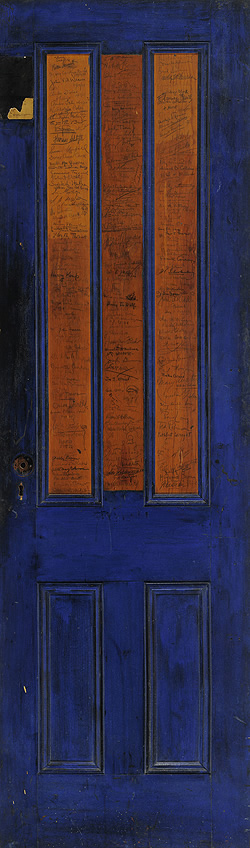
- Artist: 242 signatories
- Year: 1920–1925
- Medium: Pine, paint, ink
- Movement: Bohemian
- Dimensions: 190 cm × 61 cm (76 in × 24 in)
- Location: Harry Ransom Center, Austin, TX

The Greenwich Village Bookshop Door (1920–25) separated the back office from the main area of Frank Shay's Bookshop in Greenwich Village from 1920 until 1925, where it served as an autograph book for nearly two hundred and fifty authors, artists, publishers, poets, and Bohemian creatives. Notable signatories include Upton Sinclair, the Provincetown Players, John Sloan, Susan Glaspell, Theodore Dreiser, Porter Garnett, and Sinclair Lewis. The door has been held in the permanent collections of the Harry Ransom Center at the University of Texas at Austin since it was purchased in 1960.

== History ==
The bookshop door began its provenance at 11 Christopher Street in Greenwich Village, in the home of novelist and playwright Floyd Dell. The building was slated for demolition in 1920 when the owner of the bookshop across the street, Frank Shay, spotted the then-bright red door and salvaged it for his office. Much is yet unknown about The Greenwich Village Bookshop Door, including why individuals were chosen to sign it, which way the door originally faced, when exactly the signatures began and ended, or even when it was painted blue.

"It is true that Greenwich Village is an anomaly. To the pseudo-artist it is a Sargasso Sea, a cess-pool of lost effort and alluring but unkept promises. To the sincere student of art or literature it is America's greatest proving ground...in all this great United States it is the only place a person can sport a stocking with a hole in the heel, and an idea. Elsewhere both are taboo."

— Frank Shay, The Greenwich Villager, 1921

=== Frank Shay's Bookshop ===
Frank Shay opened his bookshop in October 1920 at 4 Christopher Street, in what had previously been the Columbia Cafe where John Masefield briefly worked as a bar-back in the mid-1890s. Another portion of the building functioned as an art studio owned by Winold Reiss until 1921, when Shay obtained the space and effectively doubled the size of his bookshop.

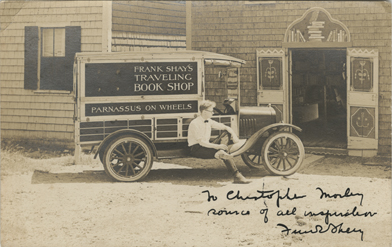
Frank Shay's Parnassus on Wheels, image signed by Shay to Christopher Morley, c. 1922.

Until the door was rescued from Floyd Dell's old apartment, Frank Shay's office was separated from the rest of his bookshop by a thin sheet that hung in the doorway. Though Shay himself never admitted it, authors William McFee and Christopher Morley would eventually both write that Frank had taken the door for more privacy as several customers and friends had seen the silhouette of him drinking in his office after the prohibition had outlawed such activity.

The signatures began on the door before Shay even had the chance to repaint it, resulting in the large unpainted areas that remain on the door today. According to Christopher Morley, author Hendrik Willem van Loon was the first to sign the door; doing so spontaneously and accompanying his name with a doodle of a sailing ship. The earliest dated signatures, those of John Van Alstyne Weaver and Porter Garnett, were added on October 17, 1921.

Frank cultivated a creative environment in his bookshop that encouraged publishers, writers, artists, theater directors, actors, cartoonists, illustrators, political activists and more to socialize and gather at his shop. Shay went beyond selling books, going so far as to edit plays for other publishing houses, lecture on the importance of books and bookselling, create a circulating library, and put a great deal of effort into his award-winning window displays. In 1921, inspired by his friend Christopher Morley's 1917 novel Parnassus on Wheels, Shay modified a Ford truck for the purpose of mobile book selling.

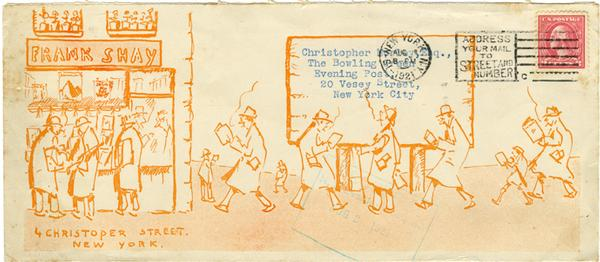
Frank Shay's Bookshop stationery, c. 1921, design by Hendrik Willem van Loon.

Frank Shay's Bookshop shelves were lined with popular novels, children's books, socialist pamphlets and avant-garde chapbooks. He placed a particular emphasis on carrying the books of Walt Whitman and Joseph Conrad. Many early 20th-century booksellers expanded their businesses by adding publishing services and Frank Shay was no exception. The bookshop published a poetry magazine titled The Measure, the Salvo series of chapbooks, a local newspaper titled The Greenwich Villager, and numerous books and booklets of poetry, prose, and plays. The bookshop even printed their own set of branded stationery and envelopes. Frank Shay sold his bookshop sometime during the summer of 1924, after his wife (Fern Forrester Shay) gave birth to their daughter Jean. The family moved to Provincetown, Massachusetts shortly after, opening a new bookshop in the Cape Cod area under the same name as the original. The bookshop in New York City appeared as "The Greenwich Village Bookshop" several times before closing permanently approximately a year later. While delivering a lecture at the University of Pennsylvania in 1931, author Christopher Morley said "It was too personal, too enchanting, too Bohemian a bookshop to survive indefinitely, but for five or six years it played a very real part in the creative life of New York City."

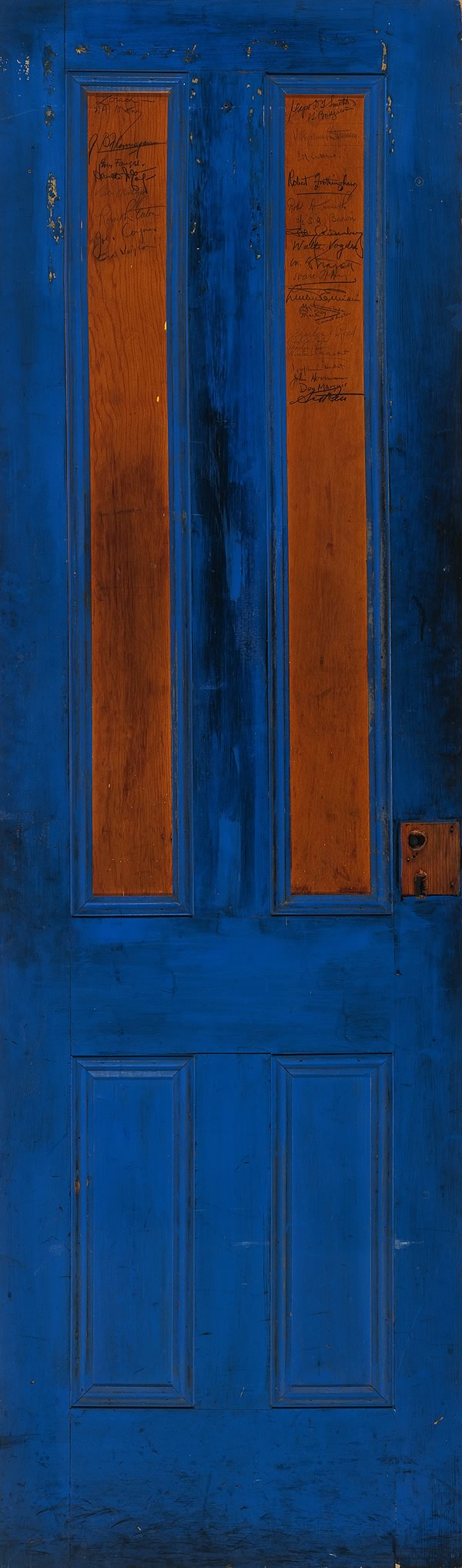
The Greenwich Village Bookshop Door, side B.

The original building that housed Frank Shay's Bookshop at 4 Christopher Street was demolished and replaced by a modern building sometime around 1960, less than a decade before the creation of the Greenwich Village Historic District would have protected it from destruction.

=== After the bookshop ===
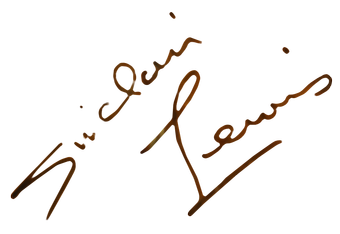
Sinclair Lewis' Greenwich Village Bookshop Door signature, front panel 3.

Creditors acquired the full inventory and contents of the shop sometime during August 1925, as financial circumstances caused the bookshop to close. Shop manager Juliette Koenig noticed that the repossession crew had ignored the door, so she took it off of its hinges and enlisted several writers to bring it back to her apartment. Finding it interesting enough to protect with varnish and store in her house for more than three decades, Juliette Koenig Smith eventually sold the door to the University of Texas at Austin through an art dealer in 1960. At this time the door was accompanied by a list of approximately 25 identified signatures and a letter from Christopher Morley that thanked Juliette for rescuing the door. The original advertisement published in the Saturday Review read:

"Mrs. Frank Leon Smith has a door for sale. On the door are the autographs of about sixty people who in the early Twenties were important, famous, talented, unusual. I'm telling you, this is a fabulous door....Want a door? Ask Mrs. Smith at 321 East 52nd Street, New York 22."

— The Saturday Review, 1960

The Harry Ransom Center at the University of Texas at Austin responded to the advertisement and purchased the door, subsequently allowing it to remain undisturbed in their collections for over a decade until a graduate student named Anna Lou Ashby discovered it in storage in 1972. While completing the first official research on the door, Ashby was able to identify 25 more signatures including those of Egmont Arens, Albert Boni, Robert Nathan, and Max Liebermann. After Ashby's brief research the door was again returned to storage where it remained for several more decades. The bookshop door was rediscovered again in 2008 and research was quickly organized by Molly Schwartzburg, a curator of literature at the University of Texas at Austin.

=== The Greenwich Village Bookshop Door: A Portal to Bohemia, 1920–1925 ===
The Harry Ransom Center mounted The Greenwich Village Bookshop Door: A Portal to Bohemia, 1920–1925 exhibition from September 6, 2011, until January 22, 2012. The exhibition marked the first and thus far only public show to include the bookshop door, with curation headed by Molly Schwartzburg. For the duration of the exhibition The Greenwich Village Bookshop Door was installed in the middle of a gallery, on a custom blue base that exactly matched the color of the door. It was encased in plexiglas and anchored to the ceiling with steel wires for added security.

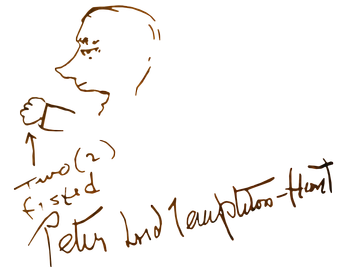
Peter Lord Templeton Hunt's Greenwich Village Bookshop Door signature and doodle, front panel 3.

Historians at the Harry Ransom Center were able to use online photograph databases and collections in 2010 to prepare for the exhibition, relying on technology that was not available when the university first acquired the door in 1960. Curators educated themselves on twentieth-century penmanship techniques to correctly match signatures on the door to those found on original manuscripts, novels, poems, letters, drawings and more. Their diligence resulted in the identification of more than one hundred and fifty additional signatures.

The physical exhibition ran concurrently with a more in-depth online, virtual exhibit that was still accessible as of 2022. This online exhibit allowed viewers to learn more about each of the identified signatories and their connections to one another. The Harry Ransom Center continues to operate a website highlighting the door's yet unidentified signatures in hopes of using the public's assistance to eventually identify every signature on the door.

In 2012, the Harry Ransom Center was nominated for an Austin Critics' Table award for "Best Museum Exhibition" for their work on The Greenwich Valley Bookshop Door: A Portal to Bohemia exhibition. The Austin Critics' Table awards are a series of longstanding Austin awards that seek to honor those involved in all aspects of the local art scene.

== Signatures ==
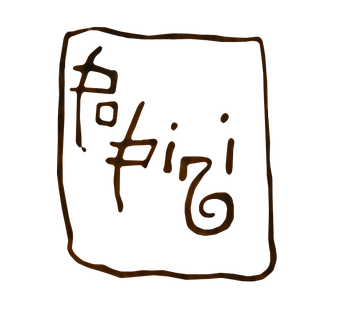
Alexander Popini's Greenwich Village Bookshop Door signature, front panel 2.

Approximately 25 autographs had been identified and connected to their respective owners by the time the University of Texas obtained the door in 1960. As of 2021, only 47 of the 242 total signatures remained unidentified. Two individuals, Laurie York Erskine and Don Marquis, signed the door on two separate occasions, and a handful of signatures are from fictional characters. During research for the 2011 exhibition historians separated the known signatures into five major groups: writing, publishing, visual arts, performance, and social groups. Many names are featured in more than one category, as day jobs overlapped with hobbies and social groups that all intersected at Frank Shay's Bookshop.

A wide selection of those involved in the 1920s literary scene in New York City and beyond signed The Greenwich Village Bookshop Door. Many worked as publishers, librarians, booksellers, and both magazine and book editors. Signatures included in the writing category consist of those of poets, historians, translators, critics, fiction and travel writers, playwrights, humorists, journalists, and screenwriters. Many of the individuals in this category had their writings censored by the New York Society for the Suppression of Vice, an organization that claimed to supervise public morality.

The performance category of signatures includes theater directors, stage actors, those employed in the early film industry, and members of theater troupes like the Provincetown Players and the Washington Square Players. Visual artists who signed The Greenwich Village Bookshop Door included architects, sculptors, cartoonists, photographers, industrial designers, illustrators, typographers and more. Both the Art Students League and the 1913 Armory Show are represented by a handful of signatures.

At least one member of the following social groups signed The Greenwich Village Bookshop Door: Skull and Bones, Three Hours for Lunch Club, Algonquin Round Table, Heterodoxy, and the Bohemian Club. Several politicians, teachers, seafarers, and Greenwich Village business owners also signed the door. Additionally, thirty-two signatures have been identified as belonging to men who served as soldiers or war correspondents in World War I.

Known signatures on The Greenwich Village Bookshop Door
Name	Category	Occupation(s)	Affiliation(s)	Notable Work/ Publication(s)
Franklin Abbott	Visual arts	Architect, illustrator	Three Hours for Lunch Club	
Achmed Abdullah	Writing	Screenwriter, translator, fiction writer	World War I veteran	Chang: A Drama of the Wilderness (1927)
Mary Aldis	Performance, visual arts	Playwright, poet, stage actor	Little Theater Movement, little magazines	
George William Armis	Publishing	Bookseller		
Sherwood Anderson	Writing	Critic, novelist, poet, playwright	Little magazines	The Masses, Marching Men (1917), Horses and Men (1923)
Egmont Arens	Publishing, visual arts	Publisher, editor, industrial designer	Provincetown Players, little magazines	KitchenAid Mixer (designer)
Mary Austin	Writing	Travel writer, playwright, teacher	Little Theater Movement	
Eugene S. Bagger	Writing	Translator, historian, journalist		
Bardar (Samuel bar Hammurabi Yaqub)	Writing	Poet, editor, typesetter		
Winslow M. Bell	Publishing	Bookseller	Greenwich Village businesses, World War I veteran	
William Rose Benet	Visual arts, writing	Artist, editor, poet, translator, seafarer	Three Hours for Lunch Club, World War I veteran	Pulitzer Prize for Poetry (1942)
Florence Blackstone	Social groups		Women's suffrage	
Paul J. Blackstone				
David William Bone	Writing	Fiction and travel writer, seafarer	Three Hours for Lunch Club, World War I veteran (UK)	
Albert Boni	Publishing	Bookseller, editor, publisher	Greenwich Village businesses, Little Theater Movement, Washington Square Players, socialism	Boni & Liveright
Charles Boni	Publishing	Bookseller, editor, publisher	Greenwich Village businesses, Little Theater Movement, Washington Square Players	
Ernest Augustus Boyd	Publishing	Critic, editor, translator		Saturday Review of Literature
Will H. Bradley	Visual arts	Film director, illustrator		
Berton Braley	Writing	Poet, fiction writer, editor		
Max M. Breslow	Publishing	Bookseller		
Heywood Broun	Social groups	Journalist, politician	Algonquin Round Table, socialism	The NewsGuild-CWA (founder)
Albert Brush	Performance	Stage actor, poet	Provincetown Players	
Arthur Caesar	Writing	Journalist, playwright, screenwriter	World War I veteran	His Darker Self (1924), Manhattan Melodrama (1934)
Henry Seidel Canby	Writing	Critic, editor, professor	Three Hours for Lunch Club	Saturday Review of Literature
Jonathan Cape	Publishing	Publisher	World War I veteran	Jonathan Cape
Gene Carr	Visual arts	Cartoonist, illustrator	Little magazines	New York Herald, New York World, New York Evening Journal
Oscar Edward Cesare	Visual arts	Cartoonist, journalist	Armory Show of 1913	The Masses
Christine Challenger	Visual arts	Illustrator		
Betty Ross Clarke	Performance	Stage actor, screen actor		If I were King (1920 film), Traveling Salesman (1921 film)
Helen Louise Cohen	Writing	Critic, editor, teacher		
Alta May Coleman	Writing	Journalist, critic		
Seward Collins	Publishing	Bookseller, publisher		
Frank Conroy	Performance	Stage actor, screen actor, theater director	Little Theater Movement, Washington Square Players	Grand Hotel (1932 film), The Little Minister (1934 film)
George Cram Cook	Performance	Stage actor, playwright, teacher, theater director	Little Theater Movement, Provincetown Players, socialism	
John Cournos	Writing	Fiction writer, poet, translator		The Philadelphia Record
Bosworth Crocker	Writing	Playwright	Provincetown Players, Washington Square Players	
J. Vincent Crowne	Writing	Professor, essayist		
Homer Croy	Writing	Fiction writer, humorist, screenwriter	Three Hours for Lunch Club	West of the Water Tower (1923)
Mary Carolyn Davies	Writing	Poet, playwright	Little Theater Movement, Provincetown Players, Bohemian Club	The Youth's Companion, The Masses
Helena Smith-Dayton	Visual arts	Illustrator, sculptor, stop-motion animator	Society of Illustrators	
Fred Erving Dayton	Publishing, writing	Journalist, playwright, publisher		
Floyd Dell	Writing	Critic, fiction writer, journalist	Provincetown Players, little magazines, socialism	The Masses
Sam DeWit	Social groups, writing	Politician, poet, writer	Little magazines, socialism	
Roy Dickinson	Publishing, writing	Critic, journalist, editor, publisher	World War I veteran	Printers' Ink
Charles Divine	Writing	Journalist, poet, playwright, teacher	World War I veteran	
Alice Willits Donaldson	Visual arts	Artist, illustrator		
John Dos Passos	Writing	Critic, editor, fiction writer	Little magazines, socialism, World War I veteran	The Masses, Three Soldiers (1921), Manhattan Transfer (1925)
Theodore Dreiser	Writing	Playwright	Provincetown Players, socialism	Sister Carrie (1900), An American Tragedy (1925)
Joseph Drum	Writing	Fiction writer, playwright		
Robert L. Eaton				
Laurie York Erskine	Writing	Novelist, educator	World War I veteran (UK)	Solebury School (founder)
Winifred Eward	Writing	Fiction and travel writer	World War I veteran	
Henry Guy Fangel	Visual arts	Illustrator, photographer		Good Housekeeping
John Chipman Farrar	Publishing	Editor, publisher, teacher	Skull and Bones, World War I veteran	The Bookman; Farrar, Straus and Giroux (founder)
Hugh Ferriss	Visual arts	Architect, industrial designer, writer		Liberty Memorial, Tribune Tower, The Metropolis of Tomorrow (1929)
Arthur Davison Ficke	Writing	Poet	World War I veteran	
John Bernard Flannagan	Visual arts	Cartoonist, sculptor, seafarer	Guggenheim Fellowship	The Masses
Dwight Franklin	Visual arts	Sculptor, set designer		Treasure Island (1934 film), Buccaneer (1938 film)
James Earle Fraser	Visual arts	Sculptor, teacher	Armory Show of 1913, Art Students League	Buffalo nickel, Equestrian Statue of Theodore Roosevelt (1939)
Joseph Lewis French	Writing	Poet		
Robert Frothingham	Writing	Anthologist, journalist, travel writer		
Barney Gallant	Publishing	Bookseller, restaurateur	Greenwich Village businesses	
Porter Garnett	Publishing	Editor, librarian, playwright, professor	Bohemian Club, Little Theater Movement	
Susan Glaspell	Performance	Playwright, stage actor	Little Theater Movement, Provincetown Players, socialism, Washington Square Players	Alison's House (1930), Pulitzer Prize for Drama (1931), Trifles (1917)
Montague Glass	Writing	Humorist, playwright		
Joseph Gollomb	Writing	Journalist, teacher	Socialism	
Herbert S. Gorman	Writing	Biographer, editor, journalist		New York Post, The New York Times
Stephen Graham	Writing	Travel Writer	Tramping	Harper's Magazine, The New Yorker
Dorothy L.A. Grant	Publishing	Bookseller		
Harry Wagstaff Gribble	Writing	Playwright, screenwriter		A Bill of Divorcement (1932 film), All Gummed Up (1947)
William Gropper	Visual arts	Cartoonist	Armory Show of 1913, socialism	The Bookman, The Masses
Louise Closser Hale	Performance	Screen and stage actor, writer		Arizona (1900), The Hole in The Wall (1929)
Harry Hansen	Writing	Historian, journalist	World War I reporter	Chicago Daily News, New York World
Sadakichi Hartmann	Writing	Actor, editor, poet, writer		
Josephine Herbst	Writing	Journalist, writer	Little magazines, socialism	Pity is Not Enough (1933)
John Hermann	Writing	Fiction writer	Socialism	Scribner's Magazine
W.E. Hill	Visual arts	Cartoonist, illustrator		This Side of Paradise (1920)
Elisabeth Sanxay Holding	Writing	Novelist		
Robert Cortes Holliday	Publishing, writing	Bookseller, critic, editor, writer	Art Students League, little magazines	The Bookman, New York Tribune
Terence Holliday	Publishing	Bookseller, critic		
Guy Holt	Publishing	Editor, publisher		
Holland Hudson	Performance	Playwright, stage actor	Little Theater Movement, Washington Square Players	
Peter Lord Templeton Hunt	Visual arts	Artist	World War I veteran	
Frank Townsend Hutchens	Visual arts	Illustrator	Art Students League	
Lewis Jackson				
Norman Jacobsen	Visual arts	Cartoonist, illustrator	Little theater movement, Provincetown Players	The Masses
Rutger Bleecker Jewett	Publishing	Editor, publisher		The Masses
Orrick Glenday Johns	Writing	Journalist, poet	Little magazines, socialism	
Merle De Vore Johnson	Visual arts	Cartoonist, illustrator, poet		
Jeanne Judson	Writing	Editor, journalist, novelist		Harper's Bazaar
Harry Kemp	Performance, writing	Playwright, poet, seafarer, stage actor	Provincetown Players, tramping, socialism	The Masses
Bernice Lesbia Kenyon	Writing	Editor, poet		Scribner's Magazine
John G. Kidd	Publishing	Bookseller, publisher	Provincetown Players	
William Albion Kittredge	Visual arts	Book artist		
Eastwood Lane	Performance	Composer		
Lawrence Langner	Performance	Playwright, theater director	Little Theater Movement, Provincetown Players, Washington Square Players	
Christian Leden	Writing	Seafarer, travel writer		The New York Times
Courtenay Lemon	Social groups	Critic, socialist activist	Socialism	
Sinclair Lewis	Writing	Critic, editor, novelist, poet	Socialism, Three Hours for Lunch Club	Babbitt (1922), Arrowsmith (1925)
Ludwig Lewisohn	Writing	Critic, novelist, teacher		
Max Liebermann	Visual arts	Illustrator, printmaker	Berlin Secession	
Nicholas Vachel Lindsay	Visual arts, writing	Artist, critic, poet	Tramping	
Preston Lockwood	Writing	Journalist, teacher	World War I veteran	
Hendrick Willem Van Loon	Visual arts	Humorist, illustrator, teacher		The Story of Mankind (1921)
Lingard Loud	Writing	Editor	World War I veteran	
Pierre Loving	Writing	Journalist, translator, writer	Little Theater Movement, Provincetown Players, World War I veteran	
Orson Lowell	Visual arts	Cartoonist, illustrator		The American Boy
Charles R. Macauley	Visual arts	Cartoonist, illustrator		
Kenneth Macgowan	Performance	Critic, director, producer	Little Theater Movement, Provincetown Players	La Cucaracha
Lawton Mackall	Writing	Critic, humorist	Three Hours for Lunch Club	
Hector MacQuarrie	Publishing, writing	Bookseller, writer	World War I veteran	The Bookman
John Albert Macy	Writing	Biographer, critic, editor	Socialism	
Jane Mander	Writing	Journalist, novelist		
Don Marquis	Visual arts	Cartoonist, illustrator, writer	Three Hours for Lunch Club	Archy and mehitabel (1927)
H.A. Mathes	Visual arts	Illustrator		
William McFee	Writing	Novelist, travel writer, seafarer		The New York Times
Alexander McKay	Publishing	Editor, publisher		
Hawley McLanahan	Visual arts	Architect		
Charles M. McLean	Publishing	Bookseller, publisher		
Ada Jaffray McVickar	Publishing	Bookseller		
Scudder Midleton	Writing	Poet	World War I veteran	Harper's Magazine
George Middleton	Performance	Playwright	Provincetown Players	Polly With a Past (1917)
Roy Mitchell	Performance	Theater director	Little Theater Movement	
Christopher Morley	Writing	Journalist, novelist, poet	The Baker Street Irregulars, Three Hours for Lunch Club	Saturday Review of Literature
Robert Nathan	Writing	Novelist, screenwriter		Portrait of Jennie (1940)
Dudley Nichols	Writing	Film director, screenwriter	World War I veteran	Bringing Up Baby (1938), Stagecoach (1939)
Robert Nichols	Writing	Poet, playwright	World War I veteran	
Charles Norman	Writing	Poet, seafarer		
Joseph Jefferson O'Neil	Writing	Journalist		
Ivan Opffer	Visual arts	Portraitist		The Bookman
Martha Ostenso	Visual arts, writing	Artist, poet, screenwriter		Wild Geese (1925)
Lou Paley	Writing	Poet, teacher		
Edmund Lester Pearson	Writing	Editor, librarian, true crime author		
Basil H. Pillard	Social groups	Teacher		
Ethel McClellan Plumer	Visual arts	Cartoonist, illustrator	Society of Illustrators, women's suffrage	The New Yorker, Vanity Fair, Vogue
Alexander Popini	Visual arts	Illustrator	Little magazines, World War I veteran	The Masses
William MacLeod Raine	Writing	Historian, novelist		
Ben Ray Redman	Writing	Critic, editor, writer		Saturday Review of Literature
Charles J. Reed	Social groups	Restaurateur	Greenwich Village businesses	
Lola Ridge	Social groups, writing	Editor, poet	Guggenheim Fellowship, little magazines, socialism, women's suffrage	The Masses
Felix Rieseberg	Writing	Explorer, journalist, travel writer	Three Hours for Lunch Club	East Side, West Side (1927)
W. Adolphe Roberts	Writing	Journalist, novelist, travel writer		Hearts International Magazine
Edwin Arlington Robinson	Writing	Playwright, poet		Pulitzer Prize for Poetry (1922, 1925, 1928)
Edwin (Ted) Meade Robinson	Writing	Humorist, journalist, poet		
Bruce Rogers	Visual arts	Book designer, illustrator, typographer		Centaur (typeface)
L. Stuart Rose	Publishing	Critic, editor, publisher	World War I veteran	The Saturday Evening Post (editor)
Herb Roth	Visual arts	Cartoonist, illustrator		New York World
Edward Royce	Performance	Theater director		
Tony Sarg	Performance, visual arts	Illustrator, puppeteer, stage actor	Armory Show of 1913	Macy's Thanksgiving Day Parade (balloon designer, 1927)
Jacob Salwyn Schapiro	Writing	Historian, teacher	Socialism	
Walter Schnackenberg	Visual arts	Illustrator		
Thomas Seltzer	Writing	Editor, journalist, translator	Little magazines	The Masses
Fern Forrester Shay	Visual arts	Illustrator		
Margaret Caldwell Shotwell	Writing	Poet		Publishers Weekly
Emil Siebern	Visual arts	Sculptor, teacher		
Upton Sinclair	Writing	Journalist, novelist	Socialism	The Jungle (1906), The Brass Check (1919), Pulitzer Prize for Fiction (1943)
John Sloan	Visual arts	Painter	Armory Show of 1913, Art Students League, Ashcan School, socialism	The Masses
Thorne Smith	Writing	Humorist, poet, seafarer	World War I veteran	
David Tosh Smith	Social groups	Seafarer	World War I veteran	
Robert A. Smith	Social groups	Seafarer	World War I veteran	
Charles Somerville	Visual arts, writing	Illustrator, journalist		
Vincent Starett	Writing	Journalist, poet, teacher, writer	The Baker Street Irregulars, Three Hours for Lunch Club	Saturday Review of Literature
Vilhjalmur Stefansson	Writing	Explorer, seafarer, travel writer		
Donald Ogden Stewart	Writing	Humorist, novelist, screenwriter	Algonquin Round Table, Skull and Bones, socialism	The Philadelphia Story (1940 film)
Gordon Stiles	Writing	Fiction writer, journalist	World War I veteran	
Emily Strunsky	Social groups			
Genevieve Taggard	Writing	Editor, poet, teacher	Little magazines, socialism	The Masses
Gardner Teall	Visual arts	Illustrator		
Sara Teasdale	Writing	Novelist, poet		Pulitzer Prize for Poetry (1918)
Lloyd M. Thomas	Performance		Provincetown Players, World War I veteran	
Basil Thompson	Writing	Editor, poet	Little magazines	
Paul Thompson	Visual arts, writing	Journalist, photographer	World War I reporter	
Helen Thurlow	Visual arts	Illustrator		Women's Home Companion, Vogue
Adolph Treidler	Visual arts	Illustrator	Society of Illustrators	The Saturday Evening Post
Peter Underhill				
Harvey P. Vaughn	Publishing	Publisher	Greenwich Village businesses	
Walter Vodges	Writing	Critic, journalist		Los Angeles Times
Charles A. Voight	Visual arts	Cartoonist, illustrator		Boston Traveler, Life, New York World
Mary Heaton Vorse	Visual arts, writing	Journalist, novelist, union organizer	Art Students League, Provincetown Players, socialism, women's suffrage	The Masses
Webb Waldron	Writing	Editor, journalist	World War I reporter	Esquire, Reader's Digest
John Leeming Walker	Social groups	Medical doctor, seafarer	Three Hours for Lunch Club	
Foster Ware	Writing	Journalist		New York Evening Post, The New Yorker
John V. A. Weaver	Writing	Journalist, poet, screenwriter	Algonquin Round Table, World War I veteran	Chicago Daily News, The Adventures of Tom Sawyer (1938 film)
Luther E. Widen	Publishing, visual arts	Book designer, publisher, typographer	Little magazines, socialism	
Edward Arthur Wilson	Visual arts	Illustrator, mystic, seafarer		
Lily Winner	Performance	Critic, playwright	Women's suffrage	Birth Control Review
Robert L. Wolf	Writing	Journalist, poet, writer	Little magazines, socialism	The Masses
Cuthbert Wright	Writing	Critic, poet, professor		The New York Times, Commonweal
Zorach	Performance, visual arts	Artist	Armory Show of 1913, Art Students League, little magazines, Provincetown Players	
Theodore F. Zucker	Social groups	Professor, researcher		

== See also ==
- The Greenwich Village Bookshop Door: A Portal to Bohemia, 1920–1925
