= Sheila Benson =

American journalist and film critic (1930–2022)

- Born: December 4, 1930; New York City, U.S.
- Died: February 23, 2022 (aged 91); Seattle, Washington, U.S.
- Education: University of California, Los Angeles
- Occupations: Journalist, film critic
- Spouses: Charles Ashley; Walter Benson; Herman Hong
- Children: 3
- Parents: Dwight Franklin; Mary C. McCall Jr.

Sheila Benson (December 4, 1930 – February 23, 2022) was an American journalist and film critic. She served as film critic for the Los Angeles Times from 1981 to 1991.

== Early life and education ==
Benson was born in New York City on December 4, 1930. Her father, Dwight Franklin, was employed as a costume designer and her mother, Mary C. McCall Jr., worked as a screenwriter and novelist.

Her family eventually relocated to Beverly Hills, California, where she attended Beverly Hills High School. She then studied drama at the University of California, Los Angeles (UCLA) alongside Carol Burnett and James Dean.

== Career ==
Benson first worked as a film critic and interviewer for the Pacific Sun in Mill Valley for eight years. She was also a film reviewer for a radio station in Marin County and wrote a column titled "Good Movies" in the Co-Evolution Quarterly beginning in the winter of 1978. She became principal film critic for the Los Angeles Times in 1981, and served in that capacity until April 1991. During her tenure, Benson was a member of the critics' panel at the 1984 Mill Valley Film Festival, and was a member of the jury at the 35th Berlin International Film Festival one year later. She also sat on the juries at the Sundance Film Festival, Toronto International Film Festival, Chicago International Film Festival, Aspen Shortsfest and in Seattle. She was conferred the Vesta Award by the Los Angeles Woman's Building in 1987. After stepping down as the Los Angeles Times film critic, Benson briefly authored a weekly column on the arts as critic at large before retiring from the paper altogether in December 1991.

Benson joined the newly established Microsoft Cinemania in August 1995 and was its film critic until its dissolution in June 1998. She also taught critical writing at UCLA. She was affiliated with the National Society of Film Critics, the Alliance of Women Film Journalists, the Los Angeles Film Critics Association and Parallax View (Seattle). Her coverage, essays and interviews appeared in publications including Variety, Premiere, Film Comment and The New York Times.

After moving to Seattle in 1996, Benson became a reviewer of films and books at the Seattle Weekly. She subsequently wrote for Critic Quality Feed.

Benson was the writer for, and host of, the Academy of Motion Picture Arts and Sciences' birthday centennial tribute of Mary Pickford in 1993. She also wrote the narration for HBO's The First 100 Years: A Celebration of American Film and the liner notes for the DVD release of Horton Foote's Tomorrow.

== Personal life ==
Benson's first marriage was to Charles Ashley. Together they had two children, Eden and Ann. She later married Walter Benson, with whom she had a daughter, Caitlin. Her third marriage was to Herman Hong. They did not have children and they remained married until her death. She resided in Bellingham, Washington.

Benson died on February 23, 2022, in Seattle at the age of 91.
