= Earnest Elmo Calkins =

Deaf American advertising executive (1868–1964)

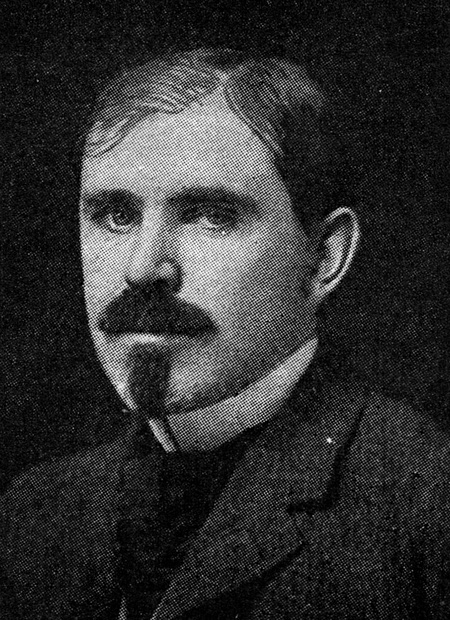
- Calkins in 1905
- Born: March 15, 1868; Geneseo, Illinois, US
- Died: October 4, 1964 (aged 96); New York City, New York, US
- Occupation: Advertising executive
- Known for: Early innovator and one of the pioneers of modern advertising

Earnest Elmo Calkins (March 15, 1868 – October 4, 1964) was a deaf American advertising executive who pioneered the use of art in advertising, of fictional characters, the soft sell, and the idea of "consumer engineering". He co-founded the influential Calkins & Holden advertising agency. His work was recognized with many awards during his lifetime and was called the "Dean of Advertising Men" and "arguably the single most important figure in early twentieth century graphic design."

== Early and family life ==
Calkins was born to Mary Manville and William Clinton Calkins in Geneseo, Illinois. They moved soon after a few miles south to Galesburg, where his father became the city attorney for a short while. At age 6, a bout of measles left him “almost completely deaf”, although it was not recognized until he was 10. His teachers told him he could hear if he paid more attention. By age 14 he was fully deaf. His mother was a Baptist who forbade him to read fiction, even Arabian Nights and Jules Verne, but he read widely on a variety of subjects, devouring books with enthusiasm. He was exposed to printing at an early age, and was determined to become a printer himself.

After high school, his father secured him a position in a local printshop as a Printer's devil, and he worked 12 hours a day for six months for no pay. When he finished his chores, he was allowed to set type for the patent medicine readers.

He attended Knox College and established a mediocre academic record, unable to hear almost anything in his classes. He did well at writing however, and in his senior year was elected editor-in-chief of the college newspaper, Coup d'État. He was then made editor of the college news published in the local paper every Thursday. He learned to master lip reading, although he said he got more from reading than from the classes. He barely graduated in 1891, after the faculty failed him in Geology, but the Trustees overruled them and allowed him to graduate.

Calkins married Angie C. Higgins (1863–1950) in 1904. They had no children.

== Professional career ==
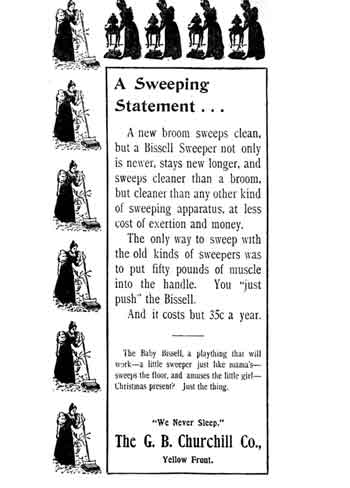
Calkins won a national contest with this design for Bissell Carpet Sweepers. Within a few months, he left his hometown to pursue a career in advertising. From the Galesburg Evening Mail, December 9, 1895, p. 8.

Once he finished college, he became a typesetter at the local paper, earning $USD10 (or about $358 in current dollars) per week. It was supposed to be his life's vocation. He was stimulated by the first publication devoted to advertising, a small periodical named Printers' Ink. Calkins gleaned ideas from the magazine, reinforcing his notion that the design of typography was important, He mustered up the courage to suggest a few of his ideas to the local merchants up and down Main Street in Galesburg, who welcomed his input. He experimented with type and layout in those local advertisements.

=== Wins ad contest ===
He learned from the hardware store owner of a contest offering $USD50 (or about $1,792 in today's dollars) to the winner who designed the best ad for a Bissell carpet sweeper as a Christmas present. He submitted an ad, one of 1,433 entries, and won the contest. One of the three judges for the Bissell carpet sweeper advertising contest was Charles Austin Bates, an important early copywriter and New York ad agency founder and owner. Calkin's winning ad impressed Bates. In the fall of 1891, against his parents' wishes, Calkins set out for New York the first time at age 23. He found work writing copy for a small print shop for a while, but returned home after less than a year, unsuccessful. He moved back into his parents' home where he worked various jobs as a printer, reporter, columnist, advertising man, and publisher. Unable to make a living, he finally secured a job as an advertising manager in a department store in Peoria, Illinois for $USD19.50 (or about $726 today), per week.

=== Joins New York ad firm ===
Calkins continued to send copies of his ads to Bates in New York, who finally offered him a job in New York at the rate of $USD15 (or about $558 in today's dollars) per week. Calkins went to work for Bates as a copywriter. Inspired by a visit to an exhibit of the Pratt Institute School of Design, he began to think hard about typography and design in advertising. He saw that form, visualization, color and design could be used to strengthen the visual appeal of advertising. As soon as he was able, he enrolled in a night course in applied design.

=== Forms own agency ===
Calkins stayed with Bates through 1902, when creative differences motivated him to go out on his own. He joined with Ralph Holden, who was in charge of new accounts at Bates, to found the advertising agency "Calkins & Holden". They opened the agency with a capital investment of $USD2000 (or about $71,667 in today's dollars). Holden brought in the clients and Calkins developed the ads. Calkins' agency pioneered the use of artwork in advertising.

In 1905, he wrote what is considered the first textbook about contemporary advertising, Modern Advertising. In 1908, George P. Rowell asked him to write a column for the same periodical he had gleaned ideas from some years before, Printers' Ink. He used it to assail "the hard-faced, mechanical, lifeless dummies that appear in magazine pages and upon posters." He said ad agencies should hire illustrators like James Montgomery Flagg and Edward Penfield, who created editorial content for periodicals.

After visiting Europe, he became an advocate for Modernism which he thought "offered the opportunity of expressing the inexpressible, of suggesting not so much a motor car as speed, not so much a gown as style, not so much a compact but beauty."

=== Focus on use of art ===
One of his early contributions to the field of advertising was to improve the quality of art used. Newspapers had their own in-house typographers, but Calkins wanted to improve the overall product-related advertising and marketing effort. Mainstream artists refused to work on advertising at the time, and he started a high quality art department at Calkins and Holden, where he encouraged the hiring of talented artists and illustrators. Calkins wanted to make advertising akin to fine art, and elevate billboards into “the poor man’s picture gallery”. They developed displays, packaging, and complete ad campaigns.

In 1920, he encouraged Louis Pedlar to form the Art Directors Club in New York. In 1921, to “dignify the field of business art in the eyes of artists” and communicate the message that “artistic excellence is vitally necessary to successful advertising,” Calkins organized the first juried exhibition of advertising art.

The agency became very successful. Its clients including a roster of high-profile companies including Beech-Nut, Thomas A. Edison Industries, H.J. Heinz, Pierce-Arrow, E. R. Squibb and Ingersoll Watch. He worked with magazines like McCall's, McClure's, The Saturday Evening Post and Woman's Home Companion. The success of the agency stemmed largely from its emphasis on design. The agency attracted many outstanding individuals, including Walter Whitehead, Myron Perley, Jack Sheridan, René Clark, Walter Dorwin Teague, and Egmont Arens. The last two are among the founders of American industrial design profession.

=== Notable ad campaigns ===
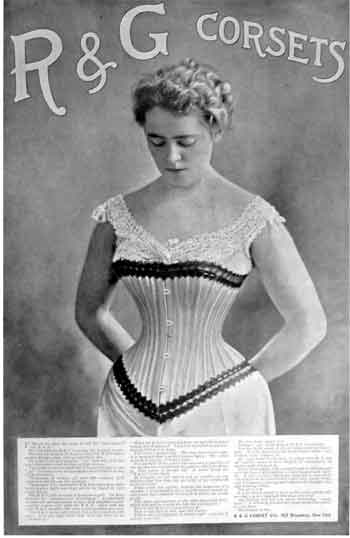
An award-winning ad for R & G Corset Company from the back cover of the October 1898 Ladies' Home Journal

One of the earliest ad campaigns by Calkins that gained notice was for the Delaware, Lackawanna and Western Railroad. Calkins created the fictional character of Phoebe Snow. Beginning in 1900, the character was used to feature the clean-burning anthracite coal used by the railroad, which left patrons' clothes much cleaner than the coal used in competitor's locomotives. The advertising campaign, based on a live model, using impressionistic techniques and a fictional character, was one of the first of its kind.

Another important campaign Calkins worked on while with Bates was for the R&G Corset company. It became a series of ads on the back cover of the Ladies' Home Journal, starting in 1898. R&G had relied on the then-traditional method of "drummers" who curried local retailers with sales talk, display stands, posters, booklets and promotional items to encourage them to carry the company's products. In 1898, the company joined with many others in experimenting with marketing through the new periodical mass media. Bates persuaded the firm to devote almost its entire promotional budget to occasional, full-page, back-cover ads in Ladies' Home Journal which cost the astronomical sum of $4000 (or about $154,800 today). Calkins was given the assignment to create the ads, each costing many times his annual salary. The use of photography was just starting to become more prevalent in periodicals, and his ads led the way in their use in advertising, emphasizing art over text. R&G was rewarded with continually growing sales, and the number of dealers carrying their goods jumped from 6,000 to 10,000.

Sunny Jim was used to advertise the "Force" ready-to-eat cereal. Sunny Jim became a well-known character across the United States before 1910.

Calkins also developed a successful campaign for Force breakfast cereal. It depicted the change in character of Jim Dumps to Sunny Jim after eating Force cereal. The ad campaign appeared on billboards and street cars, and in magazines and newspapers.

=== Tributes and recognition ===
In 1925, Calkins was the first recipient of Harvard University's Edward Bok Gold Medal for distinguished personal service in advertising. Steven Heller in Advertising: the Mother of Graphic Design in Graphic Design History described him as "arguably the single most important figure in early twentieth century graphic design." He has been called the "Dean of Advertising Men", as the man who created the contemporary advertising industry, and was inducted into the Advertising Hall of Fame.

=== Promotes consumerism ===
One of his theories featured in the book of the same name was that of "consumer engineering", or the artificial demand creation for a product using design and advertising. He described the situation in 1929 that the speed of production had “outstripped consumption”. His answer to this problem is not to slow production, for “that would be backward.” He instead suggested manufacturing demand for product through "artificial" or planned obsolescence.

Roy Sheldon and Egmont Arens, both in Calkins' employ, wrote the 1932 book, Consumer Engineering: A New Technique for Prosperity (Harper & Row, NY). In Chapter Three, "Obsolescence: Threat or Opportunity?" they wrote:

Goods fall into two classes: those that we use, such as motor cars or safety razors, and those that we use up, such as toothpaste or soda biscuits. Consumer engineering must see to it that we use up the kind of goods we now merely use.

In other words, he said, "Why would you want last year’s hand bag when this year’s hand bag is so much more attractive?" He asked, "Does there seem to be a sad waste in this process? Not at all. Wearing things out does not produce prosperity. Buying things does." He pioneered the concept of the "soft sell," or impressionistic advertising, which stresses less immediate results, and focuses on building goodwill and creating a brand, relying more on the "creative process" to produce an advertising message.

== Retirement and death ==
Calkins received an honorary degree from Knox College in 1921 and served as an honorary trustee from 1950 until his death. On June 11, 1944, he founded the Knox College Fifty Year Club for alumni who had graduated 50 years or more earlier.

Calkins retired from Calkins and Holden in 1931, five years after Holden died, when his deafness became too great a problem in contributing to the burgeoning radio advertising industry. Still vigorous at age 64, he wrote extensively and contributed many pieces to magazines and newspapers including the Atlantic Monthly and The New York Times among others. He wrote a history of Galesburg, They Broke the Prairie, published by Scribners in 1937, an autobiography, Louder, Please!, and several other books.

Calkins & Holden merged with Fletcher Richards in 1959 to become Fletcher Richards, Calkins & Holden. Calkins died October 4, 1964, in New York City. When he died, his agency was merged into the Interpublic Group of Companies.

== Selected publications ==
- The Business of Advertising. D. Appleton & Company, New York, 1915.
- Modern Advertising. D. Appleton & Company, New York, 1916. (With Ralph Holden)
- "Louder Please!" The Autobiography of a Deaf Man. Atlantic Monthly Press, Boston, 1924.
- "A Medieval Craftsman and his Types, A Great Advertiser Comments on the Goudy Types," in Monotype, a journal of composing room efficiency, May 1924, number 70, pp. 8–10.
- "Beauty the New Business Tool", Atlantic Monthly, August 1927, pp. 145–156.
- "What Consumer Engineering Really Is" in The Industrial Design Reader, edited by Carma Gorman, Allworth Press, New York, 2003. pp. 129–132 (originally published 1932)
- "And hearing not—": Annals of an Adman. Charles Scribner's Sons, New York, 1946.
