= Egmont Arens =

American publisher and industrial designer (1887–1966)

Egmont Hegel Arens (December 15, 1887 – October 2, 1966) was an American publisher of literature and art, and an industrial designer and commercial artist specializing in marketing and product packaging.

== Career ==
=== Washington Square Book Shop ===
Arens purchased the Washington Square Book Shop at 27 West Eighth Street in Greenwich Village, New York City, from Frank Shay, and operated the store from 1917 to 1923. "[T]he Washington Square Book Shop, presided over by Egmont Arens and Josephine Bell, was during the Twenties the Greenwich Villagers’ favorite shop . . . In what a high-pitched anticipatory mood we ducked into this book shop once or twice a week to see what was new on its magazine rack. Here were the publications of the new movements in American art and thought and literature. Here were the reviews that were stimulating the young." A photograph of Arens in the bookshop c. 1918 by Jessie Tarbox Beals is on the Greenwich Village History Digital Archive. View photograph.

=== Printing and publishing ===
Arens began his fine press printing and publishing career at the Washington Square Book Shop. A hand-operated printing press was located in the back room, where writers and artists would sit and exchange ideas. Arens published nine issues of Playboy: a portfolio of art and satire between 1919 and 1924. Among the writers published in Playboy were Djuna Barnes, E. E. Cummings, Lola Ridge, Max Weber, Ben Hecht, and D. H. Lawrence. Artists included Gaston Lachaise, Georgia O'Keeffe, Rockwell Kent, Hunt Diedrich, and photographer Alfred Stieglitz. George Bellows and Alexander Brook were among the other artists he published.

Arens operated the Flying Stag Press from 1918 to 1927. In 1918, he began publishing a guidebook, The Little Book of Greenwich Village. Flying Stag Press published: Paul Thévenaz, a record of his life and art, by Alice de la Mer, a limited edition of 1,000 numbered copies in 1922, and Drawings by Rockwell Kent: A Portfolio of Prints, with 28 of Kent's black and white prints, in 1924. Arens also published plays, one of which was The Angel Intrudes, by Floyd Dell, Flying Stag Plays, No. 3, in 1918. In addition, Arens worked on The Memoirs of Jacques Casanova De Seingalt, the Aventuros Edition, 12 volumes each with a frontispiece from an engraving by Rockwell Kent, translated into English by Arthur Machen with an introduction by Arthur Symons, in 1925. The Flying Stag Press also published exhibition material for the Whitney Studio Club in the 1920s.

Arens was art editor for Vanity Fair from 1922 to 1923, when that periodical was printing the work of young innovative artists. He was the editor of Creative Arts from 1925 to 1927.

From 1926 until 1928, Arens was an editor of the radical art and literature journal New Masses. The entire editorial staff and executive board was replaced in 1928 to be more overtly Stalinist.

=== Industrial design ===
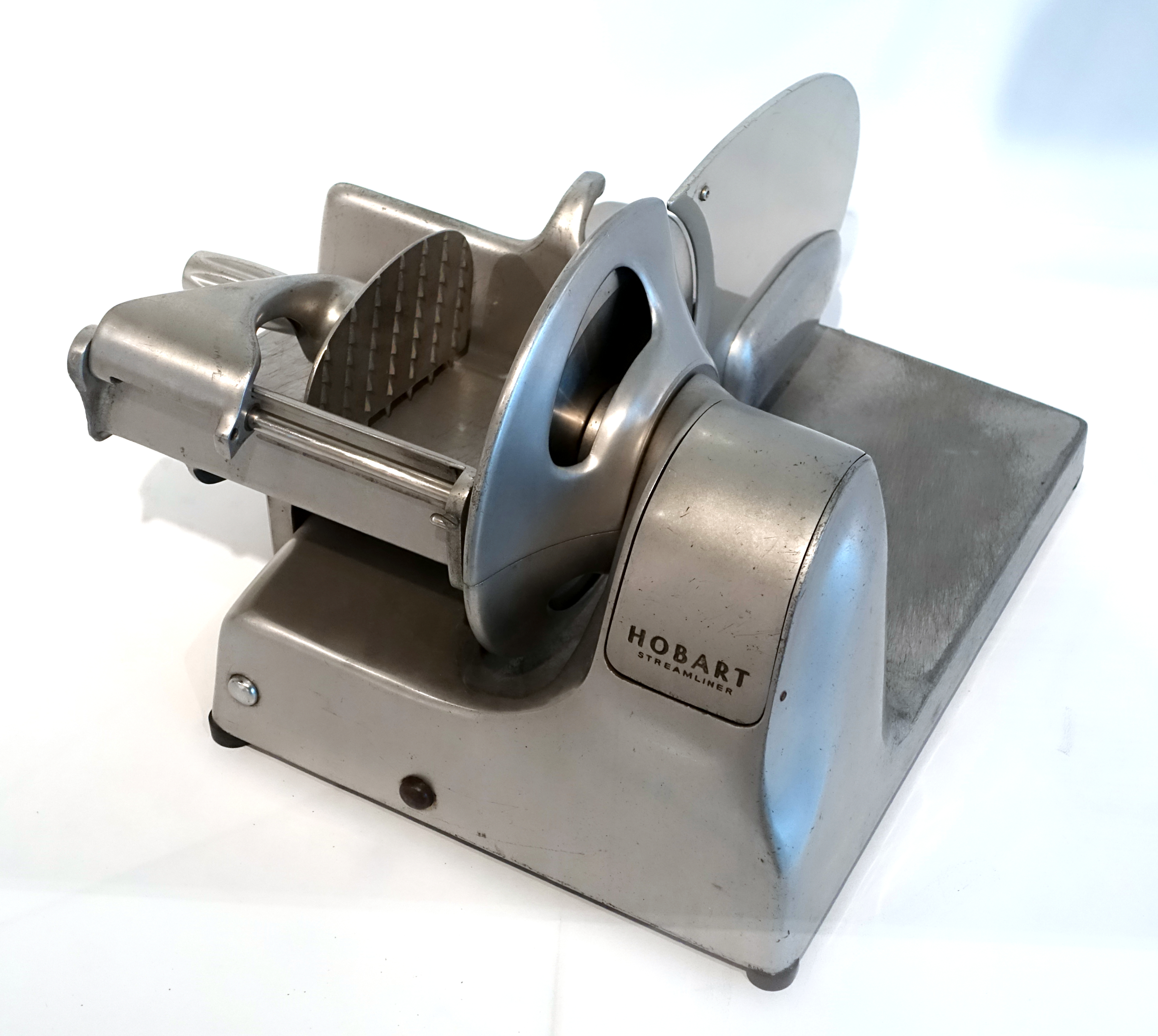
Streamliner meat slicer, model 195, by Theodore C. Brookhart & Egmont H. Arens, 1942

In 1929 Arens became Director of the Industrial Styling Division for the firm of Calkins and Holden. He was president of the American Union of Decorative Artists and Craftsmen the same year.

In 1935 he founded his own design company. His clients included General Electric, Fairchild Aircraft, Anheuser-Busch, and The Coca-Cola Company. He designed everything from toys, boats, aircraft, kitchen appliances, lamps and lampshades, beer cans, plastic containers, cigarette lighters, juke boxes, watches and baby carriages. He also worked on interior design for stores and manufacturing plants.

Arens designed a beach chair in 1935, and aluminum furniture for the Colombian Rope Company in 1944–45. In 1931, he designed fountain pens for Waterman Pens, and in 1960 a bottle for Colgate-Palmolive. He also created the ice-cube dispenser.

Arens designed the KitchenAid Streamliner Meat Slicer and re-designed the Stand Mixer. In 2007, KitchenAid said of the Stand Mixer, "The first mixer was introduced in 1919, but it was Arens' 1937 Model K design that really captivated consumers."

=== Consumer engineering ===
Arens developed the use of "appetite appeal" on packaging. He emphasized the importance of "eye-catching" colors, primarily red and yellow, and of placing photographs of food on food packaging. He designed the packaging for Eight O'Clock Coffee and Marcal Tissue Packs.

His clients included J. C. Penney, the Great Atlantic and Pacific Tea Company (A & P), the Reynolds Metal Company, Philip Morris, and the National Biscuit Company. In addition, he wrote "Color Values in Television" in 1949, and "Packaging for Color Television" in 1954.

With Roy Sheldon, Arens co-authored the book, Consumer Engineering: A New Technique for Prosperity, published in 1932. His article, "Stop Traffic With Your Package" was in the book, Modern Food Marketing, published in 1949.

In Consumer Engineering, Sheldon and Arens wrote that business must accept the "world as it is," and then to see not threats but opportunities. In fact, there was a "new world" to be charted and explored. In the first years of the Great Depression, this view was intentionally upbeat. Problems could be turned to advantage; overproduction and under-consumption could be solved by knowing the needs and wishes of consumers, by good design and use of color, by predicting fashion, not fads, and by what is now known as "planned obsolescence."

In the book, they wrote: "Would any change in the goods or the habits of the people speed up their consumption? Can they be displaced by newer models? Can artificial obsolescence be created?"

The paragraph ends with a mission statement: "Consumer engineering does not end until we can consume all we can make."

== Legacy ==
Arens was president of the Society of Industrial Designers 1949–1950, and a member of the United States delegation to the International Trade Fair, held in Liege, Belgium, in 1955.

Four issues of Playboy: a portfolio of art and satire, are in the Smithsonian Institution's Archives of American Art, including the first issue published in January 1919 and the last issue published in July 1924. All nine issues are in the Syracuse University Library and New York Public Library's Rare Books Division and Digital Collections.

Arens' books, correspondence, articles and other papers are in the Syracuse University Library's Special Collections. This collection contains many documents, photographs and slides relating to his industrial design and fine printing careers. It includes correspondence with Albert Einstein for a book idea, "Diagram for Tomorrow." The Library's Rare Books Department has Arens' donated copy of the Aventuros edition of The Memoirs of Jacques Casanova De Seingalt, along with its related papers and Rockwell Kent illustrations.

The Harry Ransom Center at the University of Texas at Austin has Arens' correspondence with Frieda Lawrence, Paul Johnston, Rex Stout, and others in the D. H. Lawrence collection. In addition the Harry Ransom Center is the custodian of The Greenwich Village Bookshop Door, a door that was signed by 242 bohemians including Egmont Arens between 1920 and 1925. His signature can be found on the second panel on the front of the door.

The KitchenAid "Streamliner" Meat Slicer, model 410, designed by Egmont Arens and Theodore C. Brookhart in 1940 is displayed in the Museum of Modern Art's gallery exhibition, "Shaping Modernity: Design 1880–1980." The KitchenAid Stand Mixer was exhibited at the San Francisco Museum of Art's exhibition, "Icons: Magnets of Meaning," in 1998.

== Personal life ==
Arens was born in Cleveland, Ohio, on December 15, 1889, the son of Franz Xavier and Emma Arens. He attended the University of New Mexico from 1911 to 1914, and the University of Chicago in 1915–16. He worked as a sports editor for the Albuquerque (New Mexico) Tribune-Citizen before moving to New York City in 1917. He was the manager from 1917 to 1920 and director in 1920 of the Peoples Symphony Concerts in New York, founded by his father. In mid-life, apparently tiring of city life, he went West, "where he went completely 'native' by raising apples and alfalfa, driving a chuck wagon, and busting broncos on a ranch."

Arens was married four times. While he was publishing Playboy, his wife was Josephine "Jo" Bell, a poet and champion of the banned literature of D. H. Lawrence and Ernest Hemingway. His last wife saved many of his papers and shared information with John McAleer, the biographer of Rex Stout, a close friend of Arens.

From 1962 until his death he was chairman of the board of Egmont Arens-DeRaffel, Inc. in New York. Arens died October 2, 1966, in New York City.

== Works published by Flying Stag Press ==
- The Little Book of Greenwich Village: A Handbook of Information Concerning New York's Bohemia, with which is incorporated A Map & Directory, published by Egmont Arens, New York, 25 cents; at bottom of ad in January 1919 Playboy: Is this booklet a delicious satire?
- Playboy: a portfolio of art and satire, nine issues (1919–1924)
- A Portfolio of Linoleum Cuts, by Horace Brodzky, 100 copies (1920)
- Paul Thévenaz, a record of his life and art, by Alice de la Mer, privately printed, 1,000 copies (1922)
- Drawings by Rockwell Kent, A Portfolio of Prints (1924)
- The Months of the Year, by the lettering class of Teachers College (1924)
- The Memoirs of Jacques Casanova De Seingalt,, 12 volumes, Aventuros (1925)
- Sandbar Queen, by George Cronyn, Flying Stag Plays, No. 1 (1918)
- The Angel Intrudes, by Floyd Dell, Flying Stag Plays, No. 3 (1918)

Catalogs of Art Exhibits and Posters

== Bibliography ==
- The Improper Bohemians: A Recreation of Greenwich Village in its Heyday, by Allen Churchill, New York: Dutton (1959)
- Consumer Engineering: A New Technique for Prosperity, by Roy Sheldon and Egmont Arens, with an introduction by Earnest Elmo Calkins, Harper Brothers (later Harper & Row)(1932)
- Twentieth Century Limited: Industrial Design in America, 1925–1939, by Jeffrey L. Meikle, Philadelphia: Temple University Press (2001)
- "Egmont Arens, 78, Designer, Is Dead," New York Times, October 2, 1966
