= Emil Siebern =

American sculptor

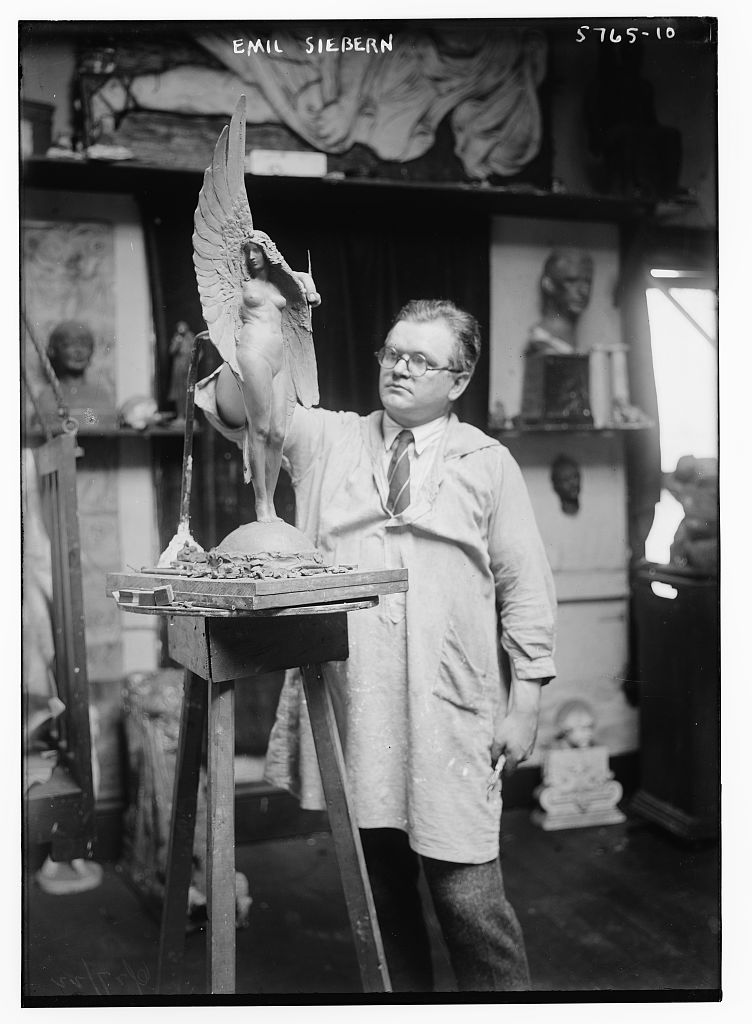
Siebern c. 1920–-1925

Emil Siebern (1888 – 1942) was an American sculptor.

He was born in New York City, one of six children – five brothers and one sister – of immigrant German parents and studied art at Cooper Union for the Advancement of Science and Art in New York City, where he met his future wife Marie Karl; she was studying the violin. The oil industry magnate John D. Rockefeller was an early patron for Siebern, who from 1909 until 1914 lived in a house on Rockefeller’s estate Kykuit in the Pocantico Hills, Mount Pleasant, and served there as "superintendent of statuary". Rockefeller financed him a tour of Italy, Greece and France to study art and sculpture there, and some of Siebern’s work appears in the gardens at Kykuit. After his wife had left him taking their three children Vincent, Everit and Marie with her, Siebern subsequently moved to Ossining and later, to Greenwich Village in Manhattan, where he taught sculpture from his studio.

For a considerable time during the Great Depression he carried out contracted works for the Works Progress Administration (WPA). Emil Siebern was signatory of The Greenwich Village Bookshop Door, a makeshift autograph book for the nearly 250 creatives who passed through Frank Shay's Bookshop between 1920 and 1925.

Siebern worked in various styles, but he was particularly adept at Art Deco and a pioneer in stainless steel as an art medium, as exemplified in this polished steel nymph with beach ball at New York's Astoria Park swimming pool in Queens. He is best known for his figurative sculptures as well as his relief panels at public buildings in New York, Detroit, Montreal and elsewhere. In 1934, he sculpted the historic bronze bust of President Theodore Roosevelt. He also made the statues of King William III and Queen Mary II originally intended for the entrance to the College of William and Mary at the end of Duke of Gloucester Street in Williamsburg, Virginia, but eventually placed in 1932 on the gate piers to the college at James Blair Drive and Richmond Road, the King and Queen Gate.

Siebern died suddenly, at age 53, in his sleep, either from a heart attack or a stroke on June 14, 1942.
