= Porter Garnett =

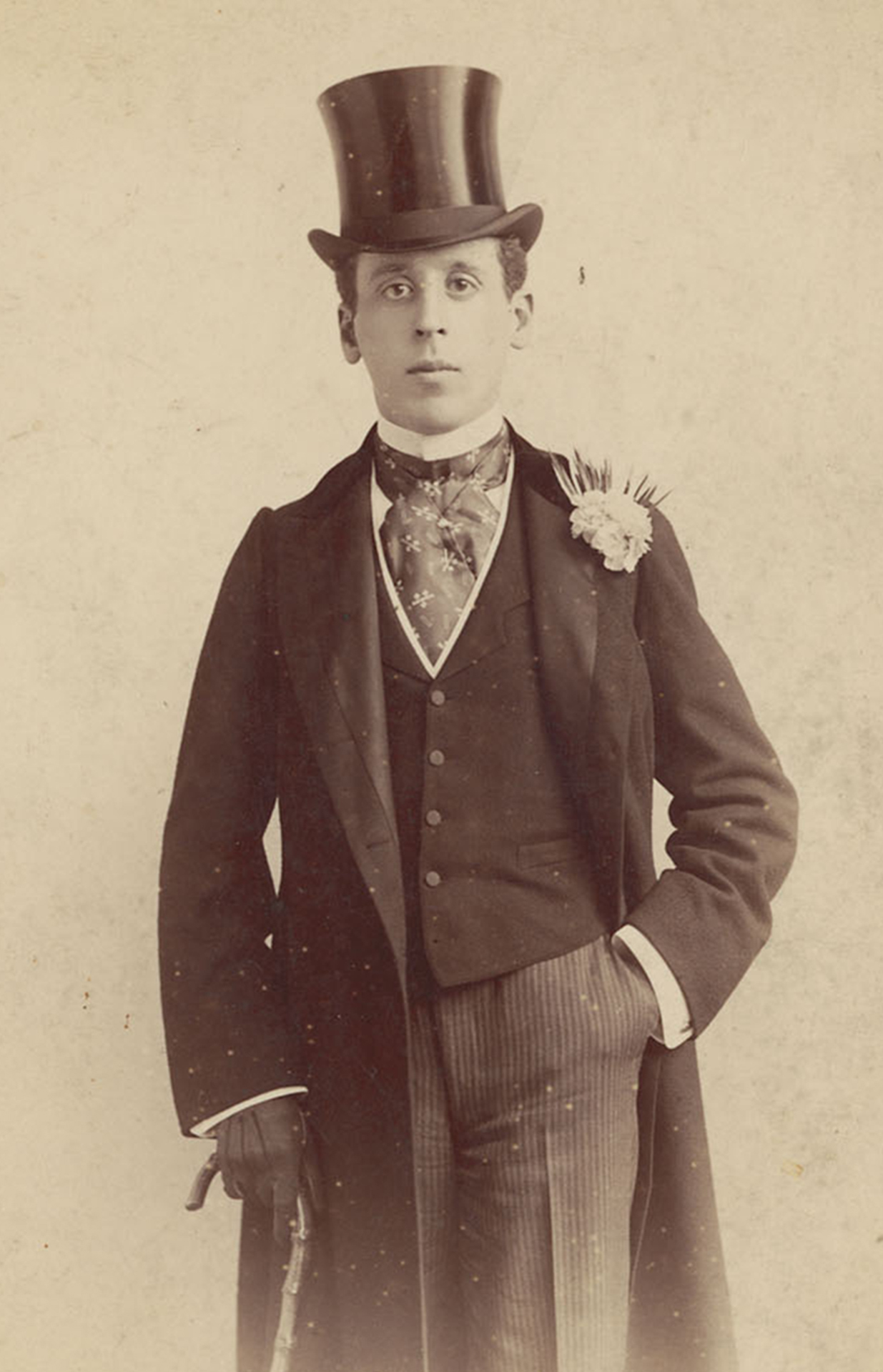
Porter Garnett 1894

Porter Garnett (March 12, 1871 – March 21, 1951) was a playwright, critic, editor, librarian, teacher, and printer.

== Biography ==
Porter Garnett was born in 1871 in San Francisco. He was an active member in San Francisco's literary scene and a member of the Bohemian Club, writing and directing plays at Bohemian Grove. In 1896, he joined The Lark, founded the previous year by Gelett Burgess and Bruce Porter. In 1907 he became assistant curator of Bancroft Library at the University of California at Berkeley.

Sometime between 1920 and 1925, Porter Garnett was one of 242 bohemians to sign The Greenwich Village Bookshop Door at Frank Shay's Bookshop. The door is now held by the Harry Ransom Center at the University of Texas at Austin, and Garnett's signature can be found on front panel 1.

In 1922, Garnett became professor of graphic arts at the Carnegie Institute of Technology in Pittsburgh, Pennsylvania, teaching traditions, development and ideals of printing. There, he founded the Laboratory Press, as the only program in the country for the teaching of fine printing until the press closed in 1935. The Press was one of the only dedicated to education in printing as a fine art. In 1932, he was awarded the AIGA Medal.

When Porter and his wife Edna retired, they established their home at Foote Ranch in the Bay Area, which Edna's father had pioneered. Garnett died on March 21, 1951, in Calistoga, California. After his death, an archive of his papers was created in his name in the Bancroft Library.

== Bibliography ==
=== Plays ===
- The Green Knight, A Vision, 1911

=== Books ===
- The Bohemian jinks; a treatise, 1908
- Papers of the San Francisco Committee of vigilance of 1851, 1910
- San Francisco one hundred years ago, tr. from the French of Louis Choris, 1913
- The lure of the traffic: a melodrama of social evil, in six acts and nineteen scenes, 1914
- A pageant of May: I. The masque of Proserpine; II. The revels of May, 1914
- The inscriptions at the Panama-Pacific International Exposition, 1915
- Stately Homes of California, 1915
- The grove plays of the Bohemian Club, 1918
