= Adolph Treidler =

American illustrator

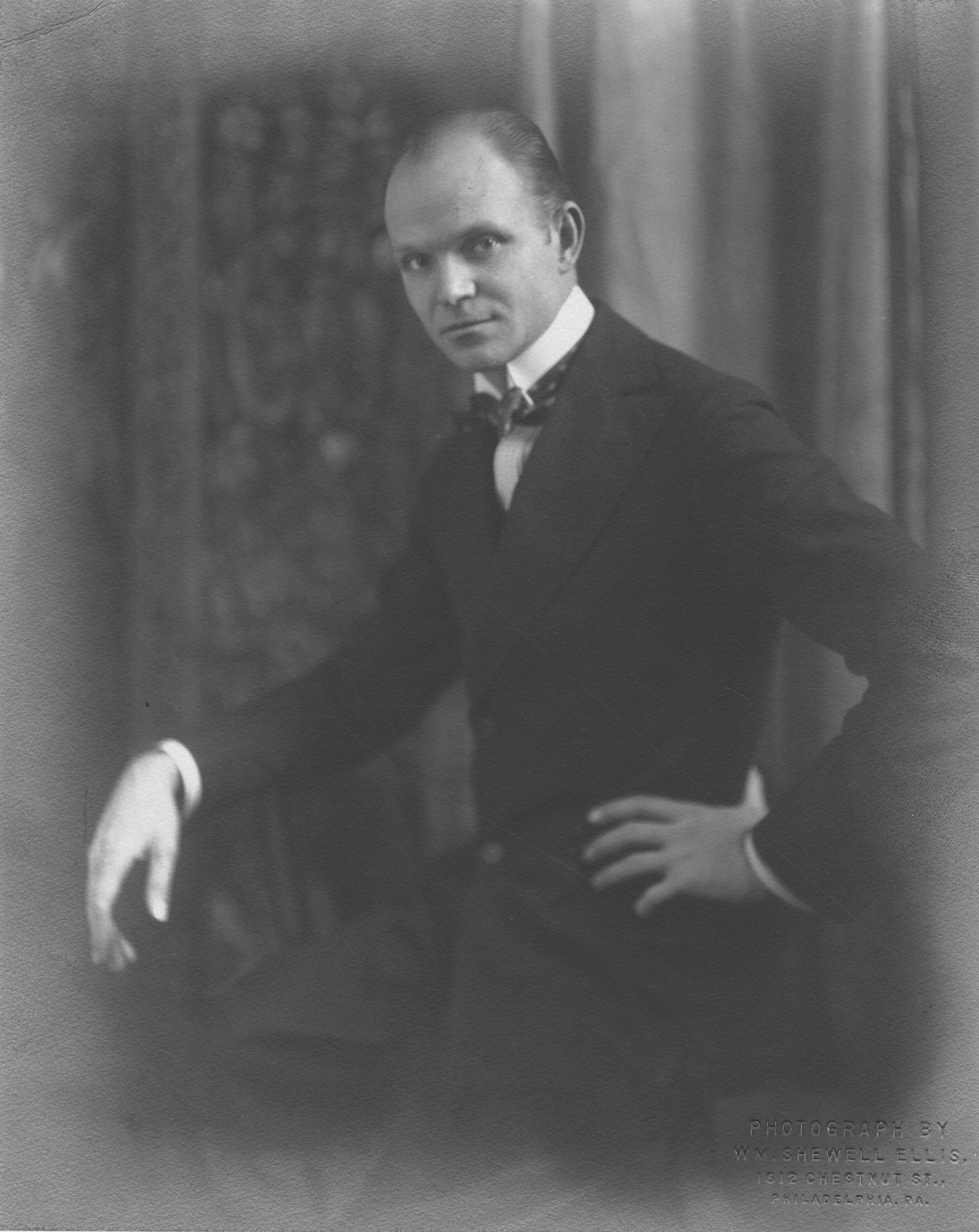
- Triedler in 1918
- Born: 1886; Westcliffe, Colorado, U.S.
- Died: 1981 (aged 94–95); Flemington, New Jersey, U.S.
- Education: California School of Design, Henri School of Art
- Known for: Illustrator and painter, known for posters

Adolph Treidler (1886–1981) was an American artist known for his illustrations, posters, commercial art, and wartime propaganda posters. His magazine covers and advertisement work appeared in McClure's, Harper's, the Saturday Evening Post, Collier's, Century, Scribner's, and the Woman's Home Companion. He created ads for the Pierce Arrow automobile and for the French Line. His 1930s advertising work for the Bermuda Board of Trade was instrumental in promoting tourism in Bermuda. He was president of the Artist's Guild from 1936–1937.

== Biography ==
Adolph Treidler was born in 1886 in Westcliffe, Colorado. He attended the California School of Design (now San Francisco Art Institute) in San Francisco from 1902 to 1904; followed by study of painting and drawing at the Henri School of Art in New York City (under Robert Henri) in 1909.

His wartime propaganda posters in World War I portrayed women workers in munitions plants for the United War Work Campaign.

He also created wartime propaganda posters in World War II. He was Chairman of the Pictorial Publicity Committee for the Society of Illustrators, and " produced at least five posters touting Women Ordnance Workers, otherwise known as WOW’s."

"Treidler was a member of the Art Directors’ Club, The Society of Illustrators, Charter Member of the Artists’ Guild, and life member of the Society of Illustrators. He exhibited at the Whitney Museum in New York in 1923 and The Art Institute of Chicago in 1930."

Sometime between 1920 and 1925, Adolph joined 241 other bohemians in signing The Greenwich Village Bookshop Door. The door is now held by the Harry Ransom Center at the University of Texas at Austin, and Treidler's signature can be found on front panel 2.

== Gallery ==
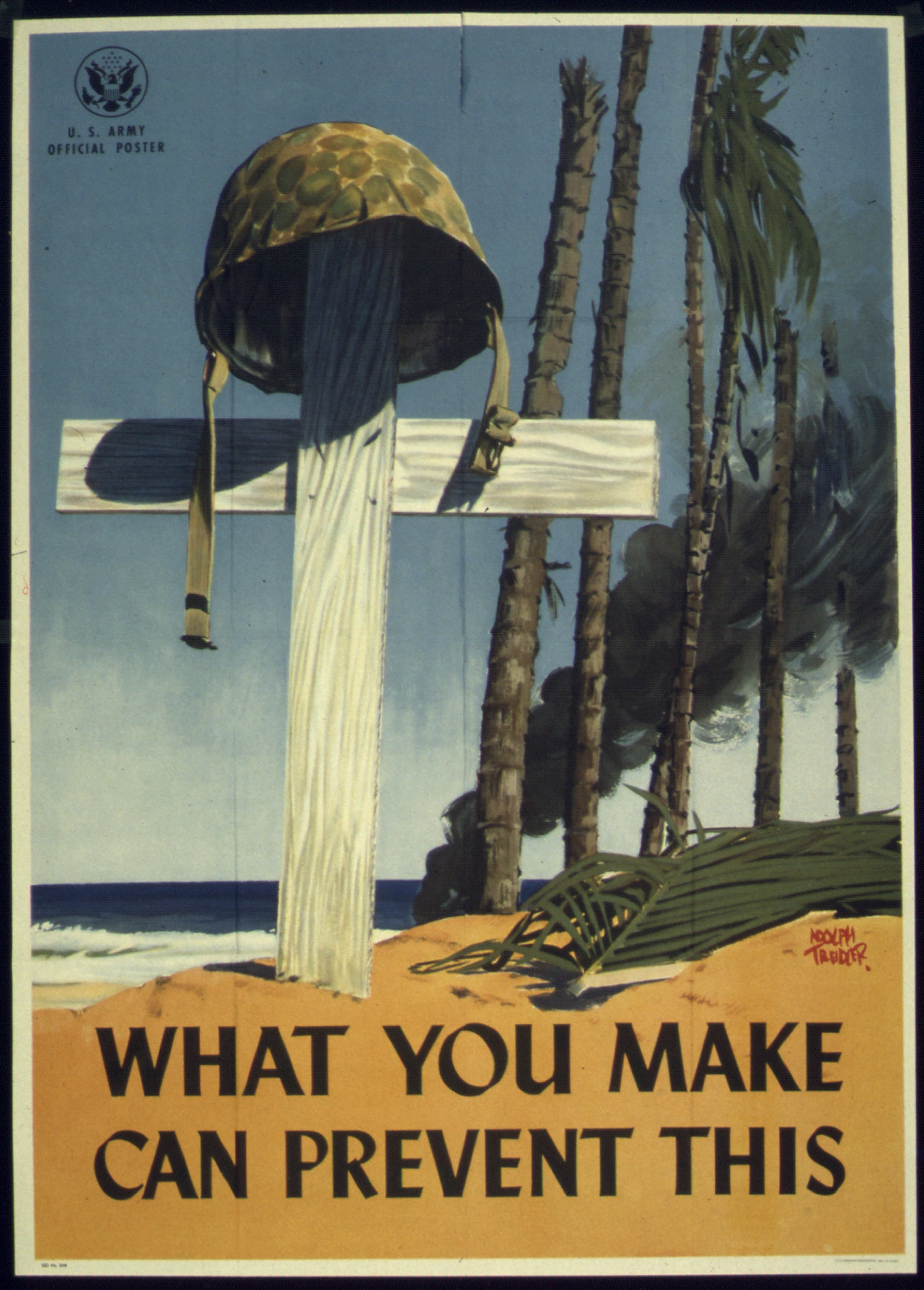

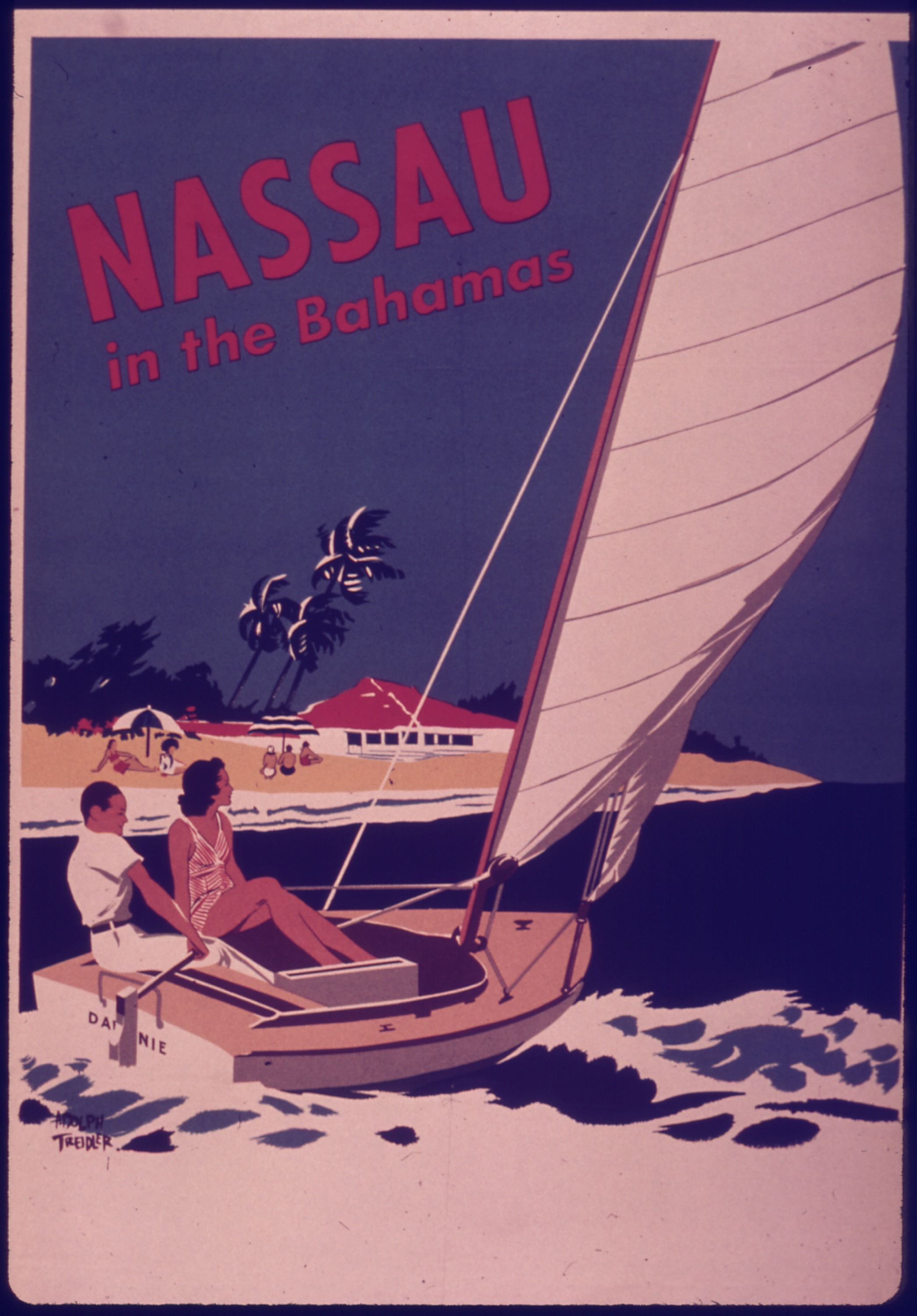

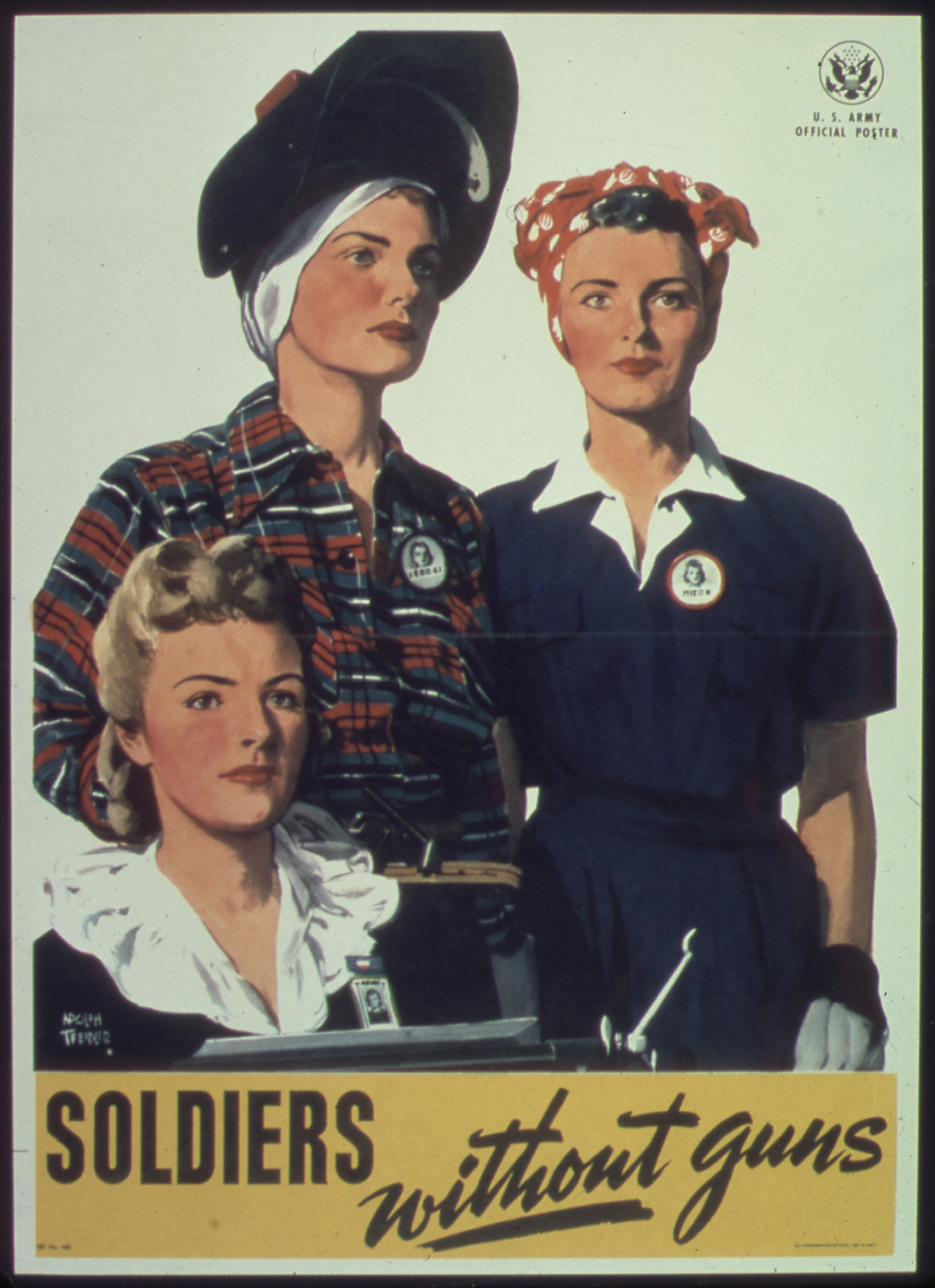

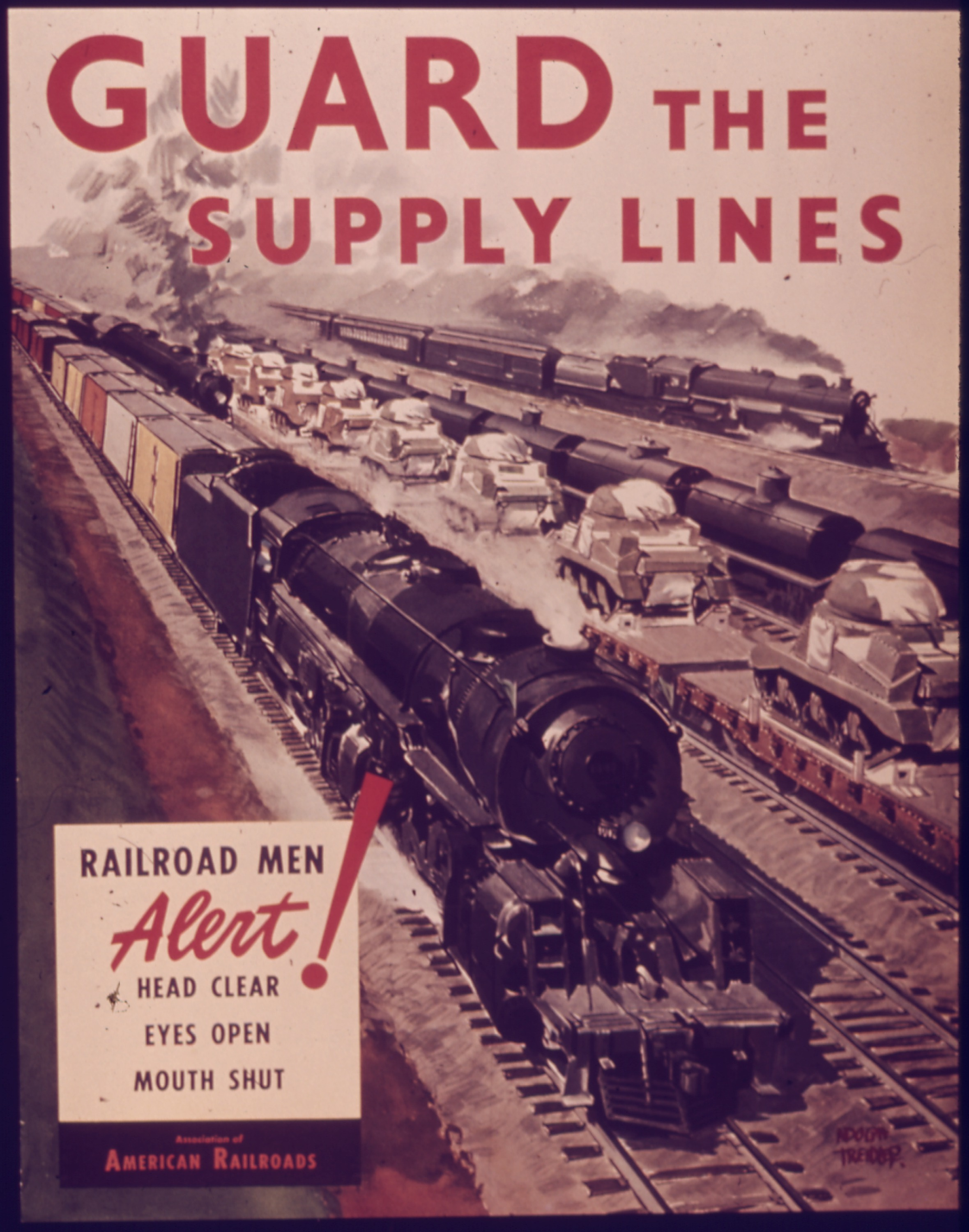

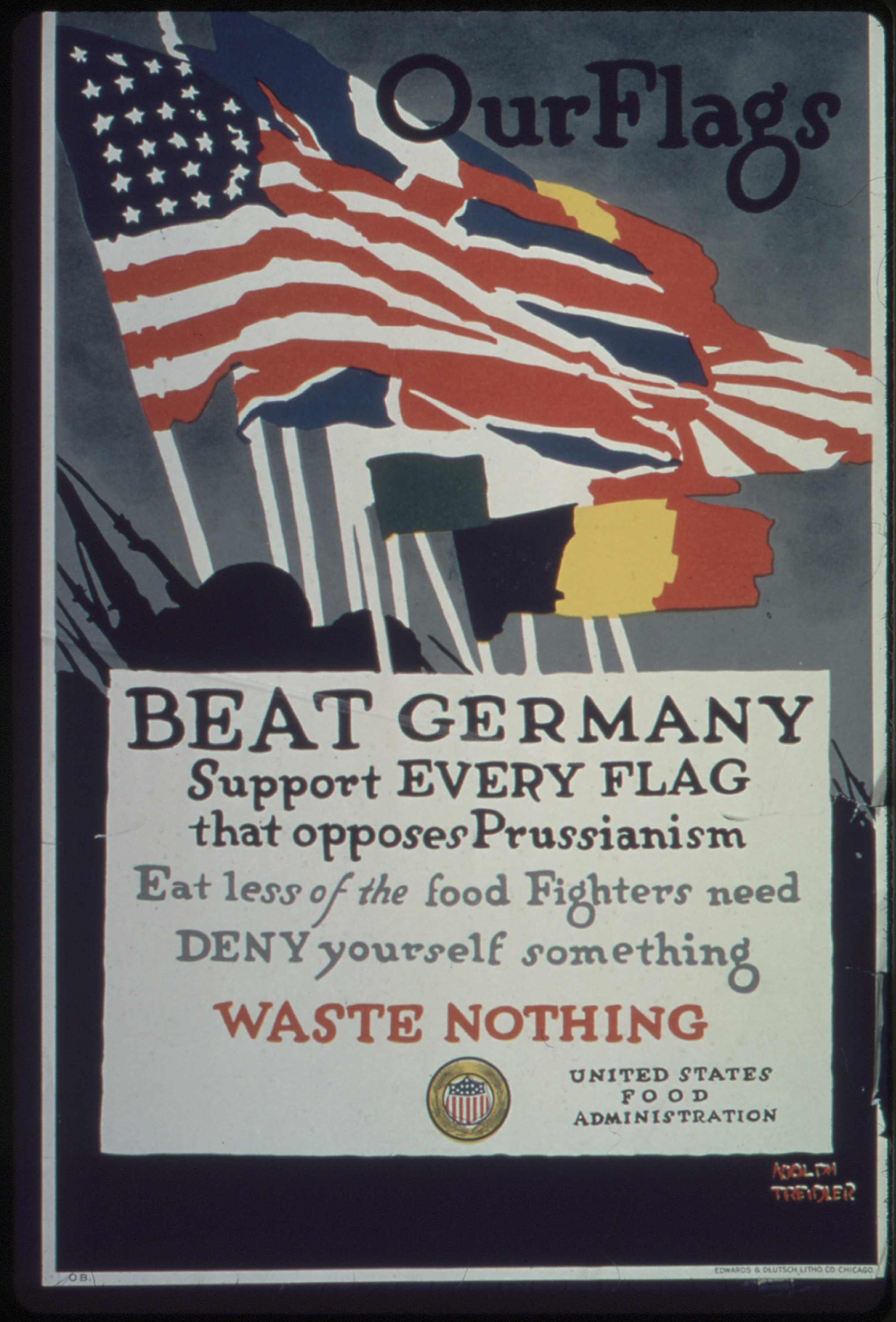

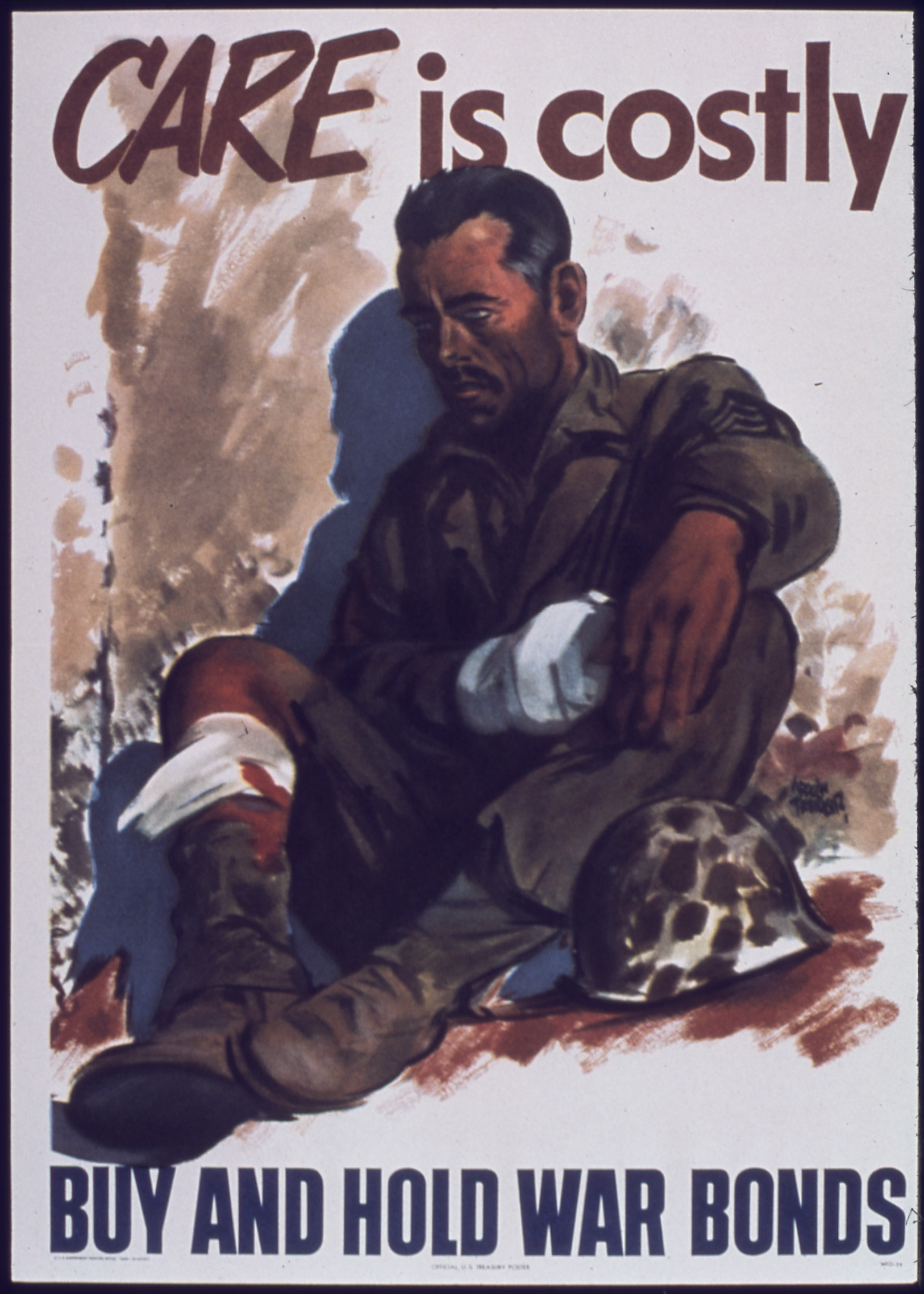
