= Helena Smith Dayton =

American animator and painter

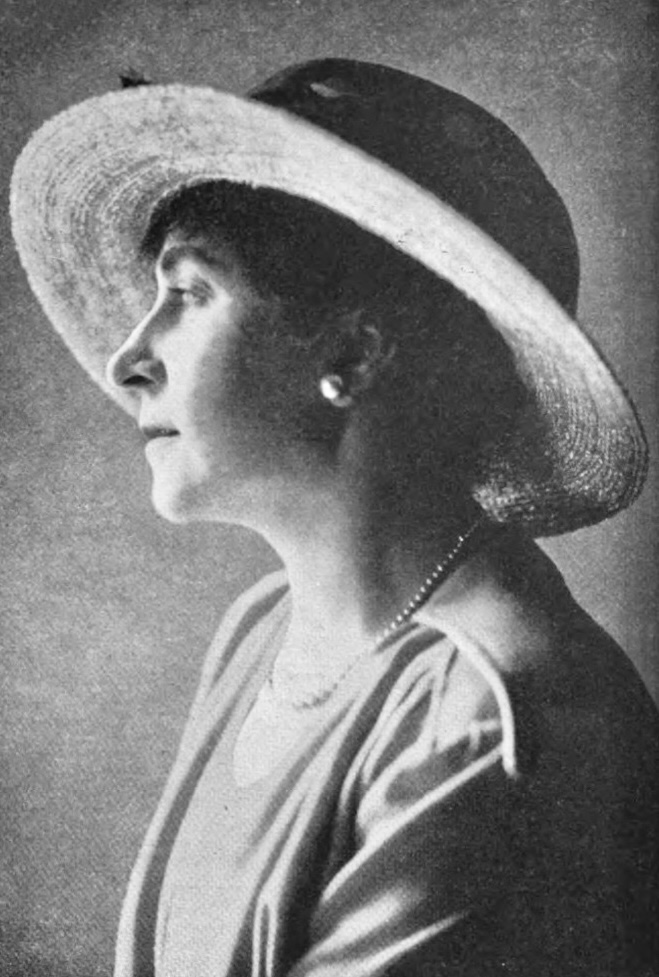
- 1917 portrait of Helena Smith Dayton
- Born: Helena Smith c.1879 Burke, New York
- Died: February 22, 1960 (aged 80–81); New York, New York
- Known for: Animation
- Notable work: Romeo and Juliet (1917)

Helena Smith Dayton (often hyphened as Helena Smith-Dayton) (1883–1960) was an American filmmaker, painter and sculptor working in New York City who used fledgling stop motion and clay animation techniques in the 1910s and 1920s, one of the earliest animators (and the first American woman) to experiment with clay animation. Her "clay cartoons" were humorous in nature, and Dayton was featured in the "Humorist Salons" in New York City. She spent the end of World War I in Paris, managing an YMCA canteen for soldiers. She was a published author, ranging in genre from journalism to plays to a guide to New York City.

== Career ==
=== Art and animation ===
Dayton began sculpting around 1914 while living in Greenwich Village in New York City. She described how she began to sculpt while she worked as a writer: "I was sitting at my typewriter, when my fingers began to itch for something to mould." She bought art clay and began to sculpt it. "From then on, I tried to fashion people as I saw them, the humorous always being uppermost in my thoughts." Her "grotesque" figurines graced magazine covers and accompanied her humorous short stories in magazines such as Puck and Cartoons Magazine. A humorist, she specialized in creating clay models of prominent citizens. She described her work as "gigglesome bits of statuary." She copyrighted some of her creations and they were marketed as "Caricatypes". The figurines, averaging 7 1/2 inches in height, cost 75 cent each. Girls dressed as Dayton's caricatypes would appear in the Ziegfeld Follies of 1916 with lines written by Dayton.

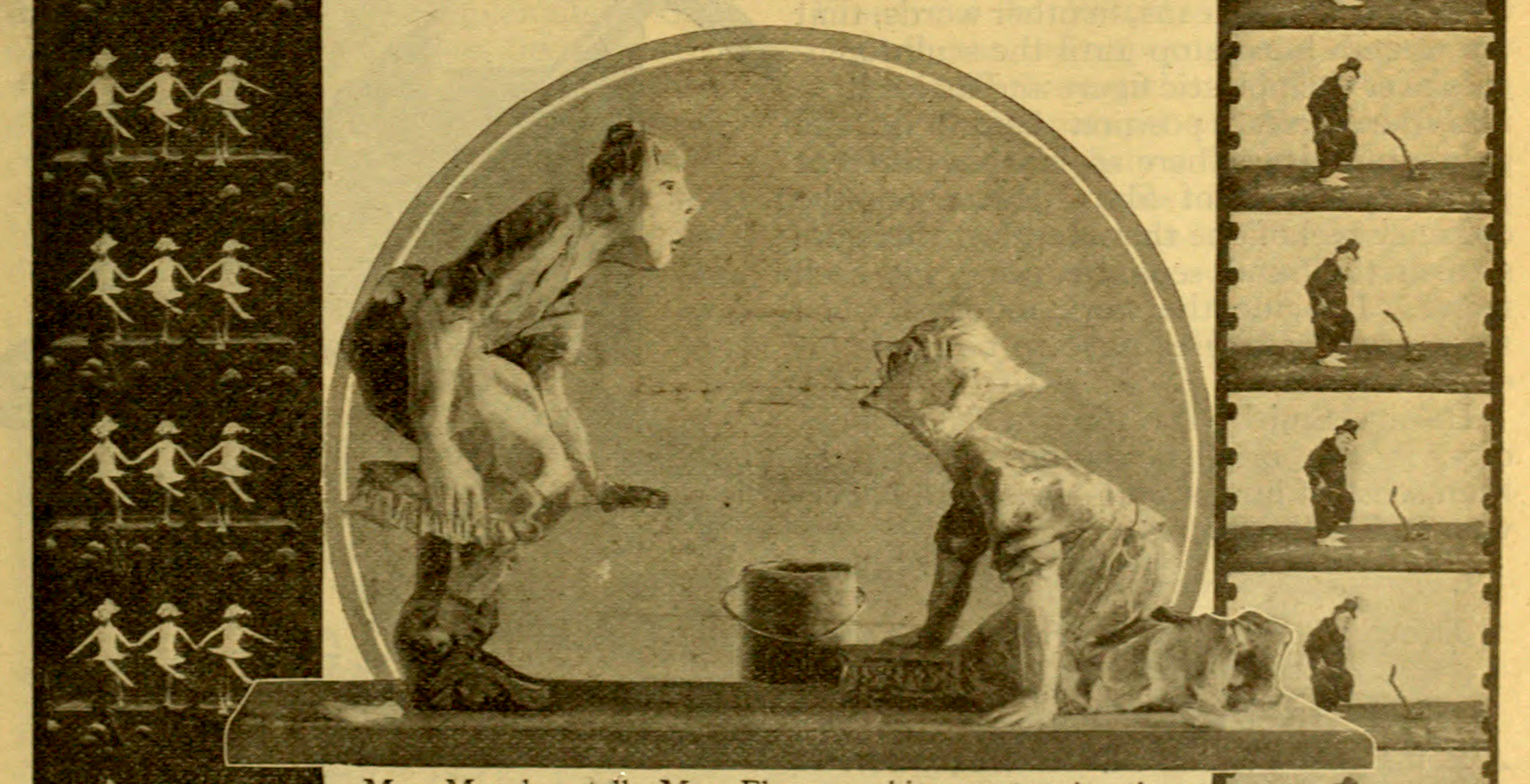
stills from Battle of the Suds and other Helena Smith-Dayton films (1917)

She began experimenting with "clay cartoons" in 1916. The February 1917 issue ofPopular Science Monthly included an article about the motion-picture novelty of "animated sculpture". Illustrations included photographs of Dayton with her clay figures, a picture from the animated sculpture play Battle of the Suds, a part of a film strip showing circa ten frames of three dancing chorus girls and another of a man and a snake. The journalist found the effect "startingly (sic) realistic and highly amusing" and believed that "the rather jerky action serves only to enhance the amusing result". Later in the year, Dayton admitted: “The difficult thing at first was to determine just how much to move an arm or a head, to avoid an appearance of jerkiness. I used to make the changes too great, but am learning to overcome that now.” Dayton created 16 poses for her sculpted figures for each foot of film, with up to 30 figurines moving in a scene. Dayton managed to animate about 100 feet of film per day and planned to release one film per month.

The first documented public screening of some of her animated shorts took place on March 25, 1917 at the Strand Theater in New York City. Later in 1917, she released her adaptation of William Shakespeare's Romeo and Juliet. Before the animated portion of the film, the introduction featured a shot of Dayton sculpting the clay figures. She contributed the short film Pride Goeth Before a Fall, featuring “dances and other stunts”, to the second issue of Pathe’s Argus Pictorial "screen magazine" released on 25 November 1917. The third edition of the program, released on 16 December, closed with a film featuring her clay figures around the banquet bord. Her forays in sculpture and animation had contributed greatly to her income by this point: her bank account contained $12,000 in 1917, the equivalent of $256,000 in 2018 dollars. Though newspapers and magazines in her day covered her work extensively and in detail, it is unclear whether Dayton produced any films after 1917. This may be due to the onset of World War I, during which she worked abroad as part of the war effort, putting her artistic work on hold. None of her films have yet been located, but impressions of her animation can be gathered from the stills and descriptions printed in magazines.

After working as a canteen director for the YMCA in Paris during World War I, she created sculpted figures depicting scenes in France. These were featured in an exhibition by the Society of Illustrators (of which she was a member) in 1922 in New York City.

Later in life, she took up painting. She exhibited her paintings in 1943 at the Montross Gallery. One New York Times art critic praised her work, calling her portraits in this exhibition "unflattering and sound, with a mining for individual character."

=== Writing ===
Before she was an animator, Dayton worked as a reporter in Hartford, Connecticut.

Dayton co-authored two guidebooks with Louise Bascom Barratt: A Book of Entertainments and Theatricals (1923) and New York in Seven Days (1926).

Later in her career, she took up playwriting. She frequently collaborated with Louise Bascom Barratt. With Barratt in 1926, she co-wrote The Sweet Buy and Buy, which was performed on stage in 1927 (produced by James Gleason and Earle Boothe) and published as a book. With Barratt again, she co-wrote Hot Water; it opened in 1929 at Lucille La Verne's theater in New York City, with La Verne in the leading role. In 1931, Casanova's Son, also co-written with Barratt, debuted in New York City.

== Personal life ==
Dayton was married to Fred Erving Dayton, a writer and publisher.

Sometime between 1920 and 1925, Helena Smith Dayton signed The Greenwich Village Bookshop Door at Frank Shay's Bookshop on Christopher Street. The door served as an autograph book for nearly 250 bohemians and is now held by the Harry Ransom Center at the University of Texas at Austin. Dayton's signature can be found on front panel 1.

== Filmography ==
1917? Battle of the Suds
1917-03-25 Animated Sculpture (program of shorts), Strand Theater, New York
1917-11? Romeo and Juliet (1.000 ft reel)
1917-11-25 Pride Goeth Before a Fall in Argus Pictorial No. 2
1917-12-16 Argus Pictorial No. 3 (featuring one short with figures around a banquet bord)
