= Robert Cortes Holliday =

Robert Cortes Holliday (July 18, 1880 – January 1, 1947) was an American writer and literary editor.

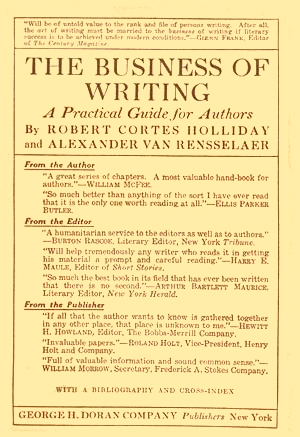
Book cover for The Business of Writing by Holliday and Renesselaer

== Biography ==
He was born on July 18, 1880, in Indianapolis, Indiana, and moved to New York to study at the Art Students' League and worked briefly as an illustrator for periodicals.

He then sold books, worked as a librarian, and became a literary editor at the New York Tribune, Doubleday, Page & Co., and George H. Doran & Co. before taking an editorial position with The Bookman, serving as its chief editor from 1919 to 1920. After he left The Bookman in 1923, Holliday continued his criticism, worked for brief stints in advertising, and in 1926 became an instructor on writing for publication. Holliday also published fifteen books, including The Walking-Stick Papers (1918), Men and Books and Cities (1920), Literary Lanes and Other Byways (1925), as well as volumes on Booth Tarkington and poet Joyce Kilmer (for whom he served as literary executor).

He died on January 1, 1947, in Manhattan, New York City of heart disease.

== Legacy ==
Writer and friend, Christopher Morley, wrote of Holliday: "[he] has the genuine gift of the personal essay, mellow, fluent, and pleasantly eccentric."

Sometime between 1920 and 1925, Robert Holliday signed The Greenwich Village Bookshop Door, an autograph book of 242 bohemians. The door is now held by the Harry Ransom Center at the University of Texas at Austin, and his signature can be found on front panel 2.

== Bibliography ==
- Walking-Stick Papers (1918)
- Booth Tarkington (1918)
- Peeps at People (1919)
- Broome Street Straws (1919)
- Men and Books and Cities (1920)
- Turns about Town (1921)
- Literary Lanes and Other Byways (1925)
