= Henry Seidel Canby =

American literary critic and editor

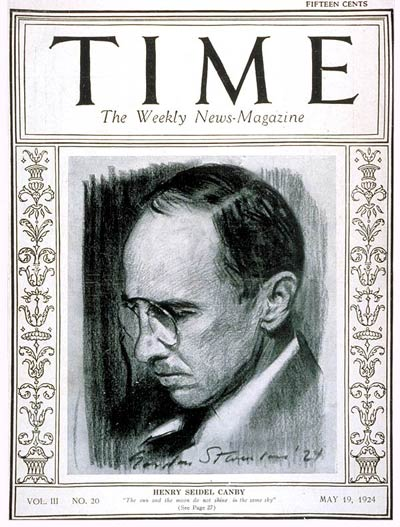
Time cover, 19 May 1924

Henry Seidel Canby (September 6, 1878 – April 5, 1961) was an American critic, editor, and Yale University professor.

A scion of a Quaker family that arrived in Wilmington, Delaware, around 1740 and grew to regional prominence through milling and business affairs, Henry Seidel Canby was a son of Edward T. Canby. Canby was born in Wilmington, and attended Wilmington Friends School. He graduated from Yale in 1899, then taught at the university until becoming a professor in 1922.

Following a four-year stint as the editor of the literary review of the New York Evening Post, Canby became one of the founders and editors of the Saturday Review of Literature, serving as the last until 1936. His notes on the work of Vilfredo Pareto in 1933 in the Saturday Review helped launch the Pareto vogue of the 1930s. In 1926 Canby became Editorial Chair of the newly created Book of the Month Club. This was a subscription book club intended to promote the notion of middlebrow culture though their premier selection was quite forward at the time.

In 1922 Canby, together with his wife Marion Ponsonby Gause Canby, Mason and Helen Fox Trowbridge, Beverly Waugh and Caroline (Lena) Jennings Kunkel, Henry Noble and Marjorie Dodd MacCracken, Lee Wilson and Marion Roberts Canby Dodd, and David Stanley and Cora Deming Welch Smith founded the Yelping Hill Association. A summer colony based on the Pocono Lake Preserve Quaker colony in Pennsylvania, where some of the families had summered in previous years. It was from his office, The Writer's Cramp, on Yelping Hill that Canby did much work for the Saturday Review of Literature and the Book of the Month Club. In his book American Memoir Canby reflects on his, and authors', work done in Cornwall citing that "it is not too much to say that for some years at least the fate of a new book of importance was more dependent upon the Hills of Cornwall than upon anything else except its own merits."

Henry Canby joined nearly 250 bohemians in signing The Greenwich Village Bookshop Door sometime between 1920 and 1925. The door is now held by the Harry Ransom Center at the University of Texas at Austin, and Canby's signature can be found on front panel 2.

He was the father of Edward Tatnall Canby (1912-1998), a noted reviewer, radio-show host, folklorist and early advocate of electronic music.

== Bibliography ==
- College Sons and College Fathers (1915)
- Everyday Americans (1920)
- Definitions: Essays in Contemporary Criticism (1922)
- American Estimates (1929)
- Classic Americans (1931)
- The Age of Confidence (1934)
- Alma Mater: The Gothic Age of the American College (1936)
- Seven Years Harvest (1936)
- Thoreau (1939)
- Walt Whitman An American (1943)
- The Brandywine (1941) (Part of the Rivers of America Series)
- American Memoir (1947)
- Introduction to Favorite Poems of Henry Wadsworth Longfellow (1947)
- Turn West, Turn East: Mark Twain and Henry James (1951)

Awards and achievements
Preceded by Homer Saint-Gaudens	Cover of Time Magazine; 19 May 1924	Succeeded by Sir James Craig
