= The Starched Blue Sky of Spain and Other Memoirs =

1991 collection of essays by Josephine Herbst

- Author: Josephine Herbst
- Language: English
- Genre: Memoir
- Publisher: HarperCollins Publishers
- Publication date: 1991
- Publication place: United States
- Pages: 178 (hardcover)
- ISBN: 978-0-06-016512-3

The Starched Blue Sky of Spain and Other Memoirs is a collection of four autobiographical essays written by radical American author Josephine Herbst and published posthumously in 1991.

== Publication ==
In 1957, Herbst received a Newberry Library fellowship to work on her memoirs, and she had intended to publish them in a collection she tentatively titled The Burning Bush. Although versions of three of the four essays were published in journals during her lifetime, she was never satisfied with them and continued revising them until her death in 1969.

== Contents ==
The first essay (both in the publication and chronologically), "The Magicians and Their Apprentices", is about her early life in Sioux City at the turn of the twentieth century. It had never been published before.

The title essay was originally commissioned for the first issue of The Noble Savage literary magazine in 1960 and described her time in the Hotel Florida during the Spanish Civil War.

It is preceded by "A Year of Disgrace", which had also been published in The Noble Savage (1961), and which describes her romance and marriage to John Herrmann.

The final essay, "Yesterday’s Road", was written in 1968, shortly before her death. It described her experience at the 1930 International Conference of Revolutionary Writers in Kharkiv, Soviet Ukraine, and her subsequent investigation as a suspected communist sympathizer. It was originally published in the New American Review (1968).

== Reception ==
Historian Arancha Usandizaga said that "The Starched Blue Sky" was "some of the most penetrating and honest written material on the [Spanish] Civil War". Publishers Weekly described the four essays as "incomparable".
