= Herbert S. Gorman =

Editor and American literary critic (1893–1954)

Herbert S. Gorman (1893–1954) was an editor and American literary critic.

== Biography ==
He was born in Springfield, Massachusetts. He began his literary career working in the press, first as a reporter and later as an editor for several newspapers in New York, such as the Times and the Herald Tribune. He also wrote poetry, articles, and book reviews for magazines. He was the author of twenty books, mostly historical novels and biographies. Gorman and his wife, Jean Wright Gorman, compiled and wrote an introduction to The Peterborough Anthology (1923), a collection of works by poets in residence at the artists' colony MacDowell Colony, in New Hampshire.

At the library of Princeton University, the manuscripts, galley proofs, and notes of six of Gorman's historical novels are preserved: The Scottish Queen (1932), The Mountain and the Plain (1936), The Brave General (1942), Wine of San Lorenzo (1945), The Cry of Dolores (1948), and The Breast of the Dove (1950), as well as an unfinished novel: The Piper's Son. The collection also includes several unpublished poems by Gorman, adaptations of novels for radio, such as Papá Goriot and Don Quijote, as well as various articles, reviews, and fragments of an early play.

The Harry Ransom Center is the custodian of The Greenwich Village Bookshop Door, a door that was signed by 242 bohemians including Gorman between 1920 and 1925. His signature can be found on the second panel on the front of the door.

Although Gorman is known primarily for his two biographies of James Joyce, only four pages of notes on this subject are included in the collection. Several photographs of Gorman, bibliographies of his works, and part of his correspondence are also included.

=== Works on Joyce ===
Gorman was the first biographer of the Irish writer James Joyce. Joyce himself contributed directly to these works with his information and comments. In a review of a reissue of one of Gorman's biographies of the Irish writer, The New York Times highlighted the attention to documentary detail that he devoted to his work, much to Joyce's liking: "[Gorman] describes the houses in which Joyce lived, the cafés he frequented, the men he knew, the books he read, the plays he saw, the music he enjoyed. Gorman revives the personality of Joyce’s Jesuit teachers, the history and curricula of his schools and the National University. He tells us that Joyce was the son of the son of a tenor, and gives us an admirable portrait of Joyce’s father, the Simon Dedalus of Ulysses". It is also stated that, in view of the few comments Gorman devoted to Finnegans Wake, the critic must have thought that it was not a masterpiece on the level of Ulysses.

== Bibliography ==
- Barcarole of James Smith, 1922
- Peterborough Anthology, 1923
- Procession of Masks, 1923
- Gold by Gold, 1925
- James Joyce: his first forty years, 1924
- L'aventure, 1926
- Victorian American, Henry Wadsworth Longfellow, 1926
- Notations for a Chimaera, 1926
- The Place called Dagon, 1927
- Incredible marquis, Alexandre Dumas, 1929
- Cabala, 1929
- Scottish Queen, 1932
- Jonathan Bishop, 1933
- Suzy, 1934
- Mountain and the plain, 1936
- James Joyce, a definitive biography, 1941
- Brave general, 1942
- Wine of San Lorenzo, 1945
- World's great novels, a broadcast series, 1945
- Cry of Dolores, 1948
- Breast of the dove, 1950
- Hawthorne; a study in solitude, 1966
- Notebook
