= Josephine Herbst =

American writer and journalist (1892–1969)

Josephine Herbst (March 5, 1892 – January 28, 1969) was an American writer and journalist, active from 1923 to near the time of her death. She was a radical with communist leanings, who "incorporate[d] the philosophy of socialism into her fiction" and "aligned herself with the political Left". She wrote "proletarian novels" conceived along the party line, "in Marxist terms" and described as a "subtle blend of art and propaganda."

== Biography ==
Herbst was born in Sioux City, Iowa. She finished high school in 1910, attended Morningside College (1910–12), the University of Iowa (1912–13), the University of Washington (1916) and the University of California at Berkeley, where she got her bachelor's degree in 1918. She then moved to New York where she affiliated herself with the people involved with The Writer and The Liberator. Friends were Genevieve Taggard, Max Eastman and Albert Rhys Williams. The journalist and poet Maxwell Anderson, who was married, became her lover. Herbst published her first short stories under the pseudonym Carlotta Geet in American Mercury and Smart Set, then edited by H.L. Mencken, for whom she had worked as a publicity writer and editorial reader.

She went to Europe in 1922. In Berlin she began to write her first, unpublished, novel Following the Circle, an account of her affair with Anderson and her own abortion, as well as her sister's fatal abortion. In Paris in 1924 she fell in love with writer John Herrmann, nine years her junior. The couple left Europe at the end of the year and lived in a New Preston, Connecticut farmhouse the next year. They were married in 1926. The Herrmanns bought a farm house in Erwinna, Pennsylvania, in 1928, that remained Herbst's home until she died. The couple separated in 1934, and divorced in 1940.

By the 1920s Herbst had made friends with Nathan Asch, Robert McAlmon, William Carlos Williams and Ernest Hemingway, Katherine Anne Porter and John Dos Passos. In addition to her novels, in the 1930s she published in several newspapers and magazines, including New Masses, then edited by Whittaker Chambers. In 1936 she was awarded the Guggenheim Fellowship. In 1937 she toured the fronts of the Spanish Civil War, as a guest of Stalinist supporters of the Second Spanish Republic.

After Pearl Harbor, Herbst got a job as a propaganda writer for foreign broadcast in the Office of the Coordinator of Information (progenitor of the CIA), but was fired a few months later in 1942 after background investigation by the FBI found that she wrote that she voted Communist, that she lobbied the U.S. Ambassador to France to get Communist aliens into the U.S., and that she was a "great admirer" of Stalin, and considered Communist Party boss Earl Browder too "timid."

During the Alger Hiss-Whittaker Chambers battle, Herbst told the FBI that in the apartment she and Herrmann shared for three months in 1934, she had seen documents taken from government offices by members of the Ware group for transmission to New York. She told Hiss's lawyers that Chambers and Herrmann discussed recruiting Hiss to help them acquire such documents, and that they and Harold Ware all told her in mid-1934 that they were already in touch with Hiss, trying to recruit him for espionage more than six months before Hiss claimed to have met Chambers.

In her letters and papers Herbst revealed that she knew Chambers as "an underground agent of the Communist Party known as 'Carl,' responsible for transmission of documents from a sympathetic cell of government employees in Washington, D.C., to Communist authorities in New York,". Ruth Herrmann, widow of Herbst's ex-husband, John Herrmann, told Langer that her late husband was "the man who introduced Chambers to Alger Hiss."

== Selected works ==
- Nothing is Sacred, 1928
- Money for Love, 1929
- Trexler trilogy:
  - Pity Is Not Enough, 1933
  - The Executioner Waits, 1934
  - Rope of Gold, 1939
- Behind the Swastika, 1936
- Satan's Sergeants, 1941
- Somewhere the Tempest Fell, 1947
- New Green World, 1954
- The Starched Blue Sky of Spain and Other Memoirs, 1991
