= Dwight Franklin =

American artist and taxidermist

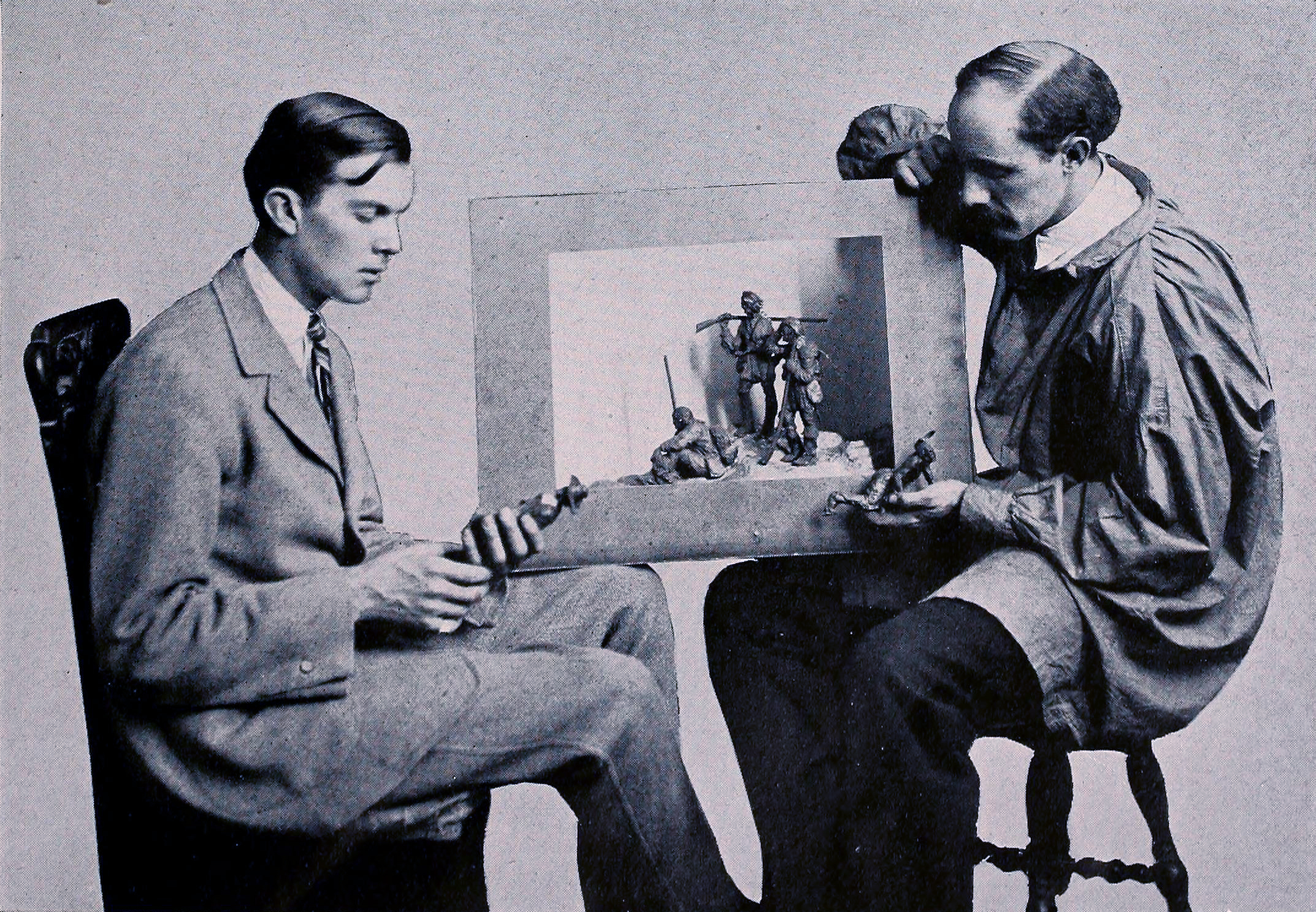
Actor Glenn Hunter and Dwight Franklin, from a 1923 magazine

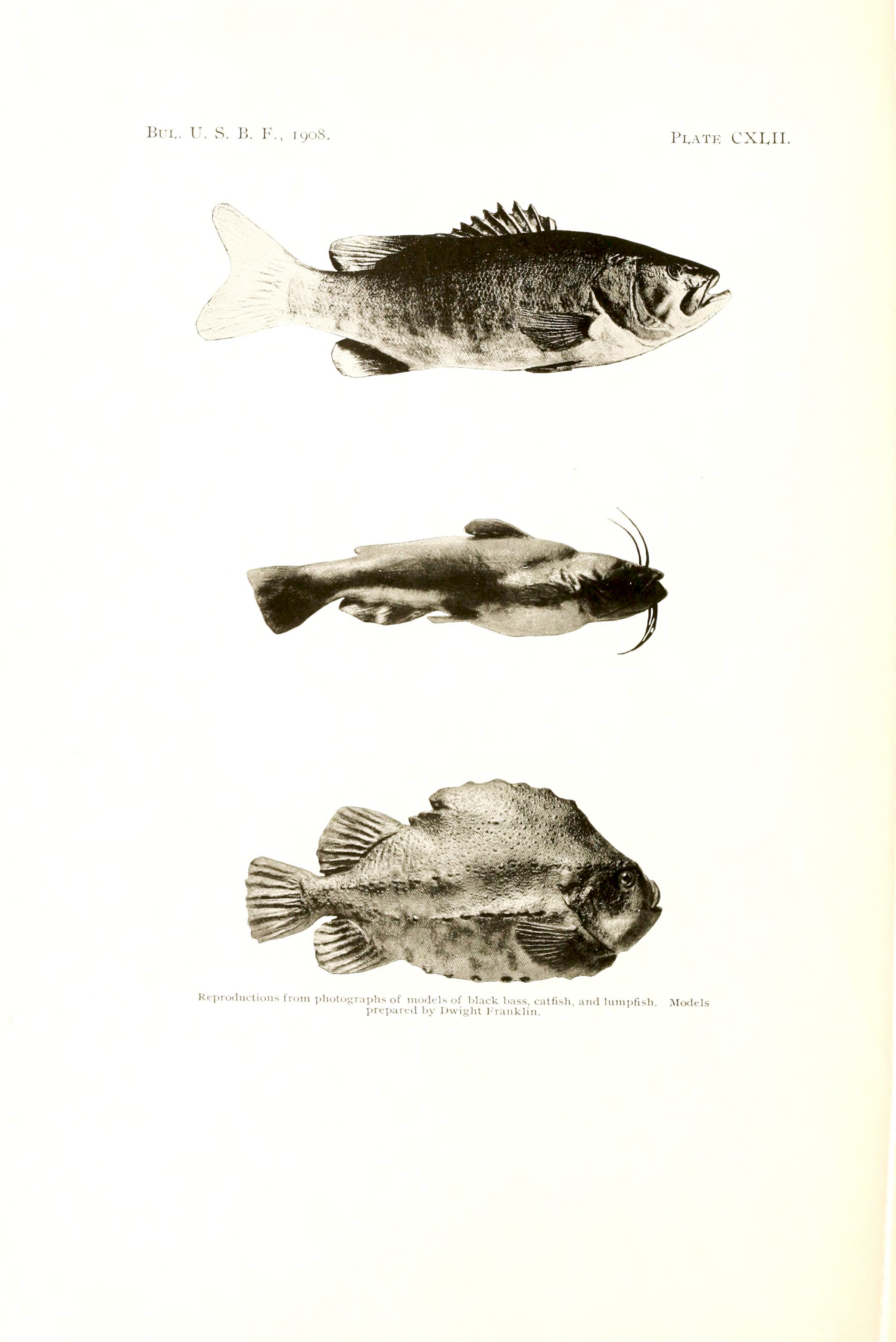
Black bass, catfish, and lumpfish models prepared by Dwight Franklin

George Dwight Franklin (1888–1971) was an American artist, taxidermist, naturalist, museum curator and costume designer for early Hollywood films.

== Personal life ==
Dwight Franklin was born on January 28, 1888, in New York City. He married Mary C. McCall Jr., a novelist and screenwriter, in January 1928. They divorced in February 1943 and he married Eliza Moultrie Franklin in 1947. They remained married until his death. Some time between 1920 and 1925, Dwight Franklin joined nearly 250 bohemians in signing The Greenwich Village Bookshop Door at Frank Shay's Bookshop on Christopher Street. The door is now held at the Harry Ransom Center at the University of Texas at Austin and Franklin's signature can be found on front panel 3.

Franklin died on January 19, 1971, in Santa Monica, California.

== Career ==
Dwight Franklin began working in 1906 as a taxidermist for the American Museum of Natural History. In 1910, he participated in a museum-sponsored expedition to Moon Lake in Mississippi, part of the habitat of the American paddlefish. Franklin created many figurines and sculptures. He built historical dioramas for the American Museum of Natural History, the Brooklyn Children's Museum, The Newark Museum of Art and the Museum of the City of New York.

In 1915, Franklin founded the American Society of Ichthyologists and Herpetologists with John Treadwell Nichols and Henry Weed Fowler.

In the early 1930s, Franklin moved from New York City to Los Angeles to begin work as a costume designer for Hollywood films.

== Selected publications ==
- Franklin, Dwight (1910). A Method of Preparing Fish for Museum and Exhibition Purposes. [Washington, Govt. print. off. doi:10.5962/bhl.title.36232. S2CID 192961139.
- Franklin, Dwight (1913). "Color Changes in Collared Lizards". Copeia. 1 (1): 2–3. JSTOR 1436102.
- "Some Fish of the Middle West". Am. Mus. J. 14: 37. 1914.
- Franklin, Dwight (1914). "Note on a Nesting Sunfish". Copeia. 11 (11): 1. doi:10.2307/1435769. JSTOR 1435467.
- Franklin, Dwight (1914). "Notes on Leopard Lizards". Copeia. 5 (5): 1–2. doi:10.2307/1435769. JSTOR 1435769.
- Franklin, Dwight (1914). "Comparative Numbers of Lizards and Snakes on Desert". Copeia. 12 (12): 2. JSTOR 1436702.
- Franklin, Dwight (1915). "Notes on a Fish Caught Three Times". Copeia. 22 (22): 36. JSTOR 1437000.
- Franklin, Dwight (1915). "Notes on Amblystoma Tinigrum at Flagstaff, Arizona". Copeia. 21 (21): 30–31. doi:10.2307/1435786. JSTOR 1435786.
- "A Recent Development in Museum Groups". Proceedings of the American Association of Museums. 11: 110–112. 1916.

== Complete filmography ==
Complete known filmography of Dwight Franklin
Name	Genre	Year	Role
The Black Pirate	Adventure, action	1926	Consultant
Treasure Island	Adventure, family	1934	Technical advisor
Anthony Adverse	Adventure, drama, romance	1936	Technical consultant; 18th-century costumes
The Plainsman	Western	1936	Costume designer
The Buccaneer	Adventure, biography, drama	1938	
Reap the Wild Wind	Action, adventure, drama	1942	Wardrobe designer
The Adventures of Mark Twain	Adventure, biography, drama	1944	Technical advisor
Frenchman's Creek	Adventure, drama, romance	1944	Technical advisor
Sinbad, the Sailor	Adventure, family, fantasy	1947	Men's costume designer
Unconquered	Adventure, drama, history	1947	Production illustrator
Tycoon	Adventure, drama, romance	1947	Men's wardrobe
The Exile	Adventure, romance	1947	
Samson and Delilah	Drama, family, history	1949	Illustrator
Fair Wind to Java	Action, adventure, drama	1953	Technical advisor
