= Carma Gorman =

American art historian (born 1969)

Carma Ryanne Gorman (born January 1969) is an American art historian known for her work in the area of design history. Her American Quarterly article "Educating the eye: Body mechanics and streamlining in the United States, 1925-1950" was one of ten reprinted in the Organization of American Historians' anthology The Best American History Essays 2008.

== Early life and education ==
Carma Gorman was born in January 1969. She earned her BA in art history at Carleton College in 1991 and her MA and PhD in the history of art at the University of California, Berkeley in 1994 and 1998 respectively.

== Career ==
Gorman was an assistant professor and associate professor at Southern Illinois University from 1998 to 2013. Since 2013 she has been associate professor and then assistant chair in the history of design at the University of Texas at Austin.

She is a member of the board of directors of the College Art Association, an associate editor of the academic journal Design and Culture, and a past president of the Design Studies Forum.

== Selected publications ==
- "An Educated Demand:" The Implications of Art in Every Day Life for American Industrial Design, 1925–1950", Design Issues, Vol. 16, No. 3, pp. 45–66.
- The Industrial Design Reader. Allworth Press, New York, 2003. (Editor) ISBN 1581153104
- "Educating the eye: Body mechanics and streamlining in the United States, 1925-1950", American Quarterly, Vol. 58, No. 3, pp. 839–868.
- Objects, Audiences, and Literatures: Alternative Narratives in the History of Design. Cambridge Scholars, Newcastle, 2007. (Edited with David Seth Raizman) ISBN 9781847180926
- "The Role of Trademark Law in the History of US Visual Identity Design, c.1860–1960", Journal of Design History, Vol. 30, Issue 4 (November 2017), pp. 371–388. https://doi.org/10.1093/jdh/epx024
