= Pity Is Not Enough =

1933 novel by Josephine Herbst

- First edition
- Author: Josephine Herbst
- Cover artist: KLI & M
- Language: English
- Genre: Semi-autobiography, Modernist literature
- Publisher: Harcourt Brace
- Publication date: 1933
- Publication place: United States
- Media type: Print (hardback)
- Followed by: The Executioner Waits

Pity Is Not Enough is a 1933 semi-autobiographical modernist novel by American author Josephine Herbst and the first book in her Trexler family trilogy. It is followed by The Executioner Waits (1934), and Rope of Gold (1939). The novels interrelate United States history from Reconstruction to the Great Depression with Herbst's family history, reflecting the ideological crises of the early twentieth century. The trilogy has been compared with John Dos Passos's major work, the U.S.A. trilogy, which was published in the same decade.

== Origins and inspiration ==
Many characters in the trilogy are inspired by Herbst's family including Victoria, the main character, which is based on Herbst herself, and Joe, inspired by her father. A majority of the political events and themes represented in the novel and its sequels are based on experiences stemming from Herbst's prior work as a Leftist journalist, which was published in The New Masses and The Nation.

As for the novel's themes and the related title, Herbst wrote of her characters: "pity cannot save them. . . . The old standbys . . . religion, respectability, are so many straw bridges."

== Plot introduction ==
Pity Is Not Enough follows the Trexlers' history after the American Civil War and before World War I. While the main narrative focuses on the Trexler family, the chronology is often disrupted by inter-chapters focusing on Victoria's childhood.

Victoria recalls her mother, Catherine, telling the story of her unfortunate brother Joe Trexler, a man who had left his family's home in Philadelphia to work as a carpetbagger in Reconstruction-era Georgia. When trouble began to hound him, he escaped first to Canada, where he made acquaintances with the Governor of Georgia, and then returned home for a short while. He manages to escape from the local law by moving again, this time to the west where he joined the gold rush in the Black Hills in Dakota Territory.

Future promises of financial success do not become fruitful for Joe or for the majority of his family. His favorite sister Catherine dies relatively young, his two other sisters marry failures who are unable to support them properly, and his younger brother, Aaron, becomes a moderate success but is relatively unhappy. His youngest brother, David, does have some success. Over time Joe slowly falls into dementia. Victoria eventually comes to the conclusion that her Uncle Joe's failure, like her father's failure in business, is not due to personal shortcomings, but to capitalist economic forces beyond their control.
