= Bookstore tourism =

Cultural tourism

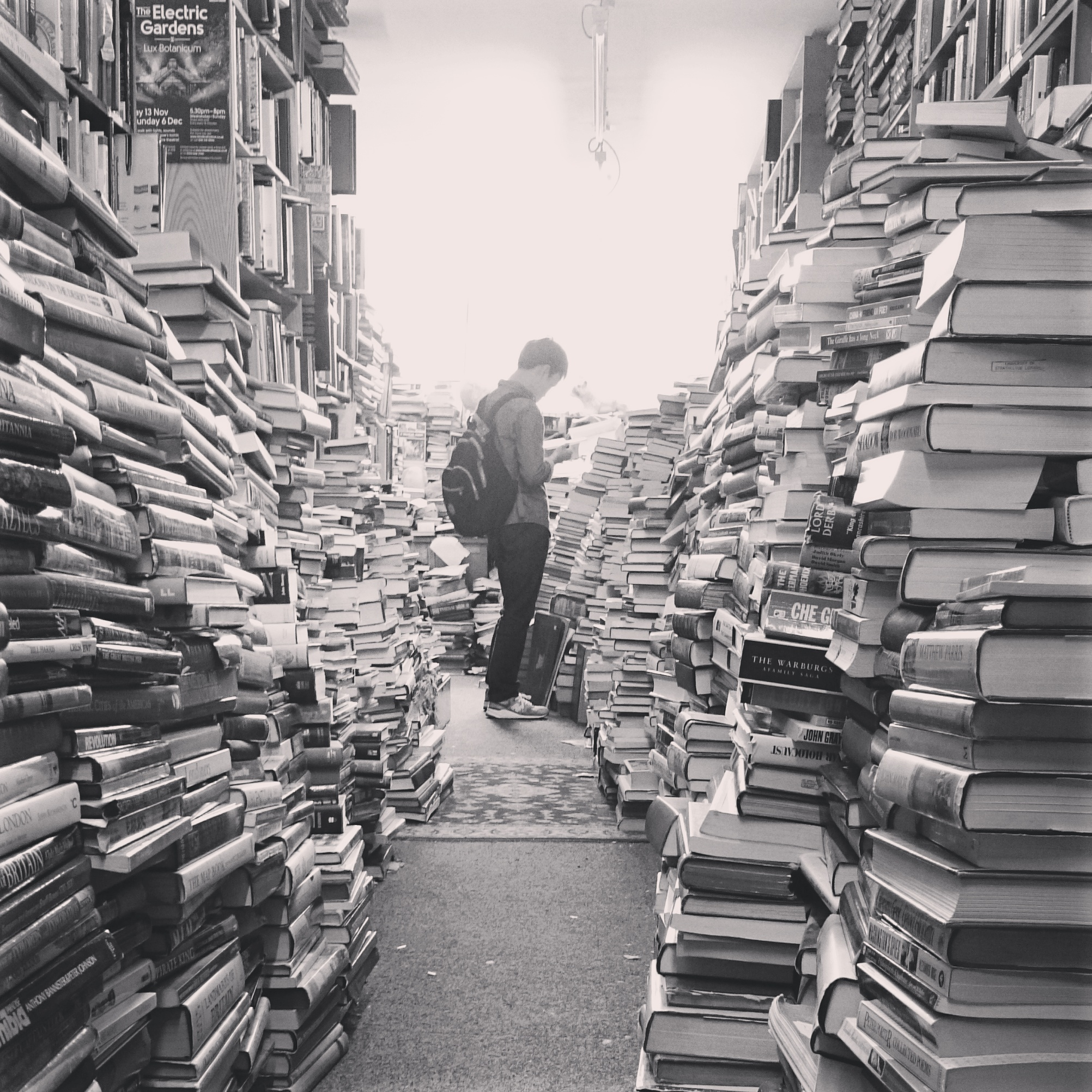
Inside the Voltaire & Rousseau bookshop in Glasgow

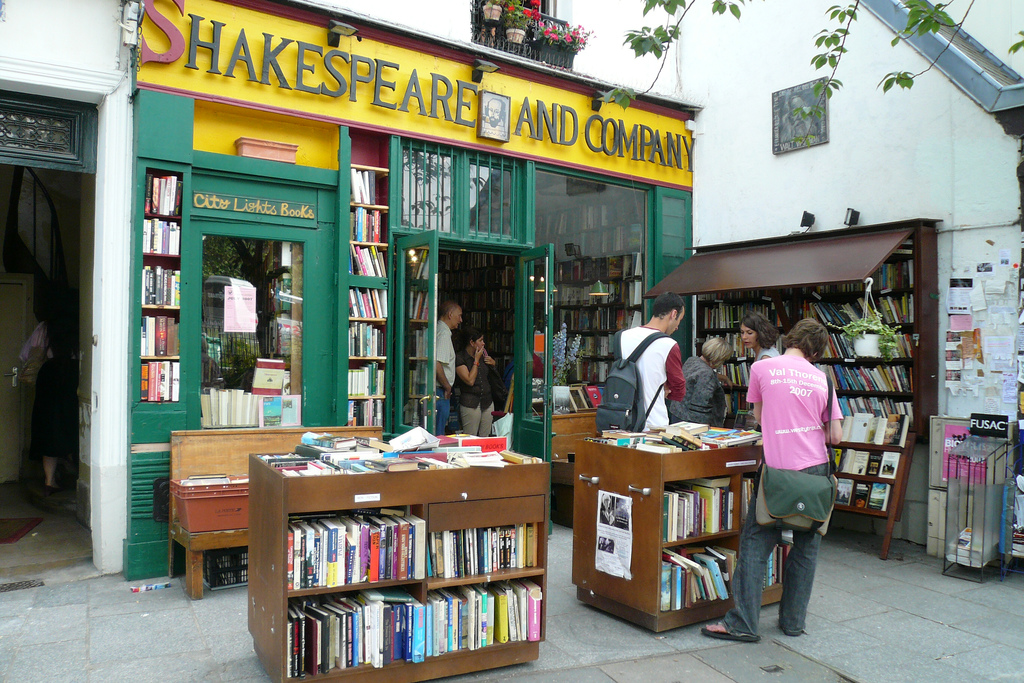
Shakespeare and Company in Paris.

Bookstore tourism is a type of cultural tourism that promotes independent bookstores as a group travel destination. It started as a grassroots effort to support locally owned and operated bookshops, many of which have struggled to compete with large bookstore chains and online retailers.

The project was initiated in 2003 by Larry Portzline, a writer and college instructor in Harrisburg, Pennsylvania who led "bookstore road trips" to other cities and recognized its potential as a group travel niche and marketing tool. He promoted the concept with a how-to book and a web site, and groups around the U.S. soon began offering similar excursions, usually via a chartered bus, and often incorporating book signings, author home tours, and historical sites. The most famous bookstore tourism destination is Hay-on-Wye in Wales. In 2005-06, two regional booksellers associations—the Southern California Booksellers Association and the Northern California Independent Booksellers Association—embraced Bookstore Tourism, offering trips to independent bookstores in Los Angeles, San Diego and San Francisco.

The Bookstore Tourism movement encourages schools, libraries, reading groups, and organizations of all sizes to create day-trips and literary outings to cities and towns with a concentration of independent bookstores. It also encourages local booksellers to attract bibliophiles to their communities by employing bookstore tourism as an economic development tool. Others benefiting include local retailers, restaurants, bus companies, and travel professionals.

The effort also provides organizations with an outreach opportunity to support reading and literacy.

Portzline has traveled across the country to promote the concept. In 2006 he created a promotional video featuring group "bookstore road trips" in New York City's Greenwich Village and in Los Angeles area "beach towns" and posted it on the Bookstore Tourism website.

Portzline took a year off in 2008, and in early 2009 began to promote the effort again, partly in response to the effects of the U.S. financial crisis on independent booksellers.

In 2007, The New York Times argued that the Pioneer Valley in Western Massachusetts, is the "most author-saturated, book-cherishing, literature-celebrating place in" the United States. In particular, it discussed three bookshops in the region, Amherst Books in Amherst, Massachusetts, Broadside Bookshop in Northampton, Massachusetts, and The Odyssey Bookshop in South Hadley, Massachusetts.

In 2008, USA Today listed nine top bookstore travel destinations in the United States as: Books & Books in Coral Gables, Florida; City Lights Books in San Francisco; the Elliott Bay Book Company in Seattle; Politics and Prose in Washington, DC; Powell's Books in Portland, Oregon; Prairie Lights in Iowa City, Iowa; Tattered Cover in Denver, Colorado; That Bookstore in Blytheville in Blytheville, Arkansas; and the Strand Book Store in New York City.

Bookstore tourism is encouraged by organizations such as the Massachusetts and Rhode Island Antiquarian Booksellers (MARIAB). Founded in 1976, the organization has 125 business members as of 2013, publicizes its member bookstores with a website and a free annual directory booklet, and sponsors an annual "Pioneer Valley Book & Ephemera Fair".

== See also ==
- Bookselling
- Book town
- Independent bookstore
- Used book
- Used bookstore
- Book store shoplifting
