= The Book Rack =

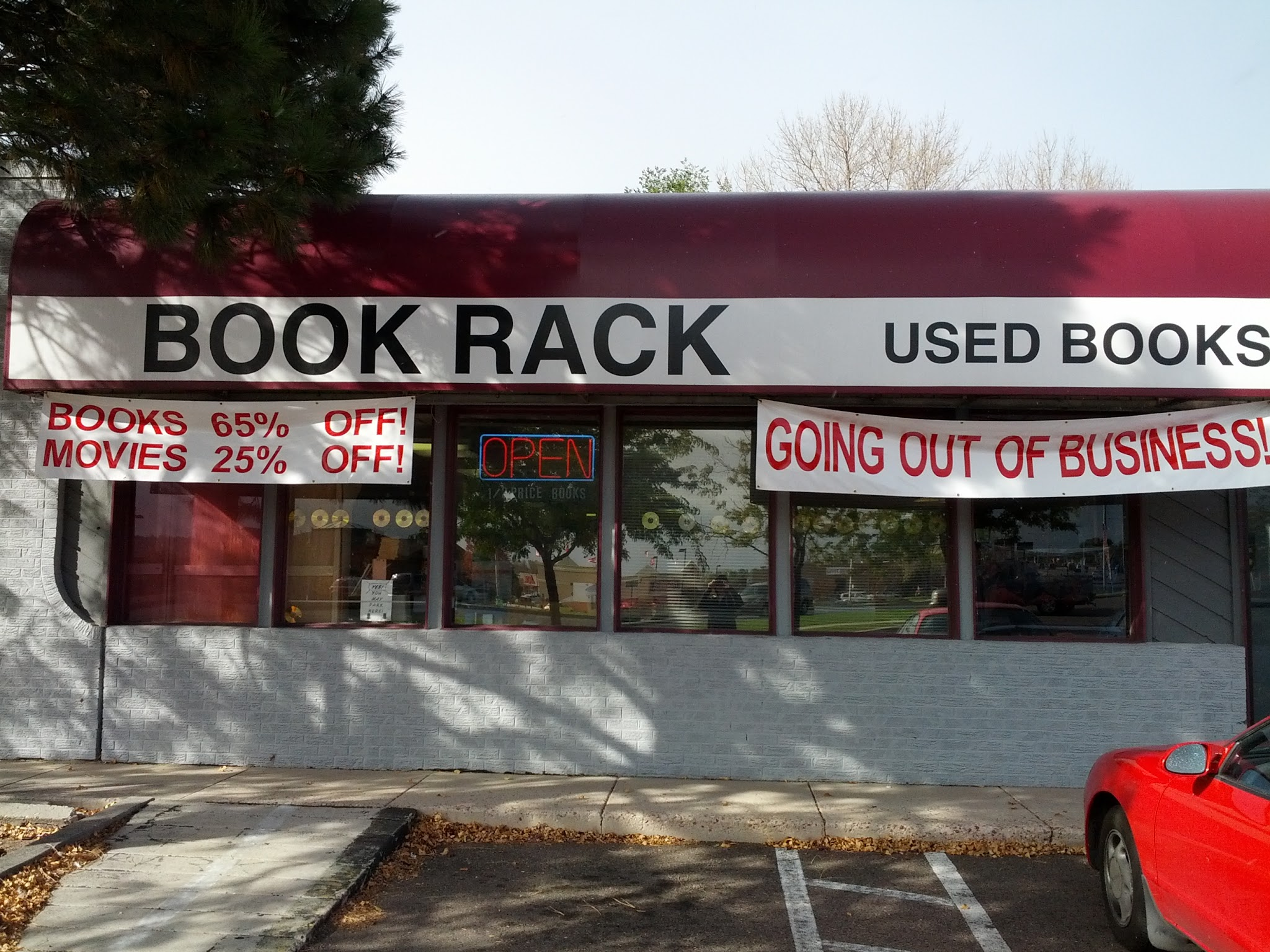
Book Rack store in Colorado Springs, Colorado, 2012.

The Book Rack is a nationwide association of independently owned used bookstores across the United States. Founded in the early 1960s, it centers on the buying, selling, and trading of gently used books. The group includes over 100 stores spanning numerous states from coast to coast, positioning it as one of the country's largest collections of independent bookstores. While each location operates independently and is distinctly influenced by its owner and local clientele with no standardized format, they are united by the common practice of accepting book trade-ins for store credit and maintaining broad inventories of pre-owned titles. The brand turned 50 years old in 2025.

== Gallery ==
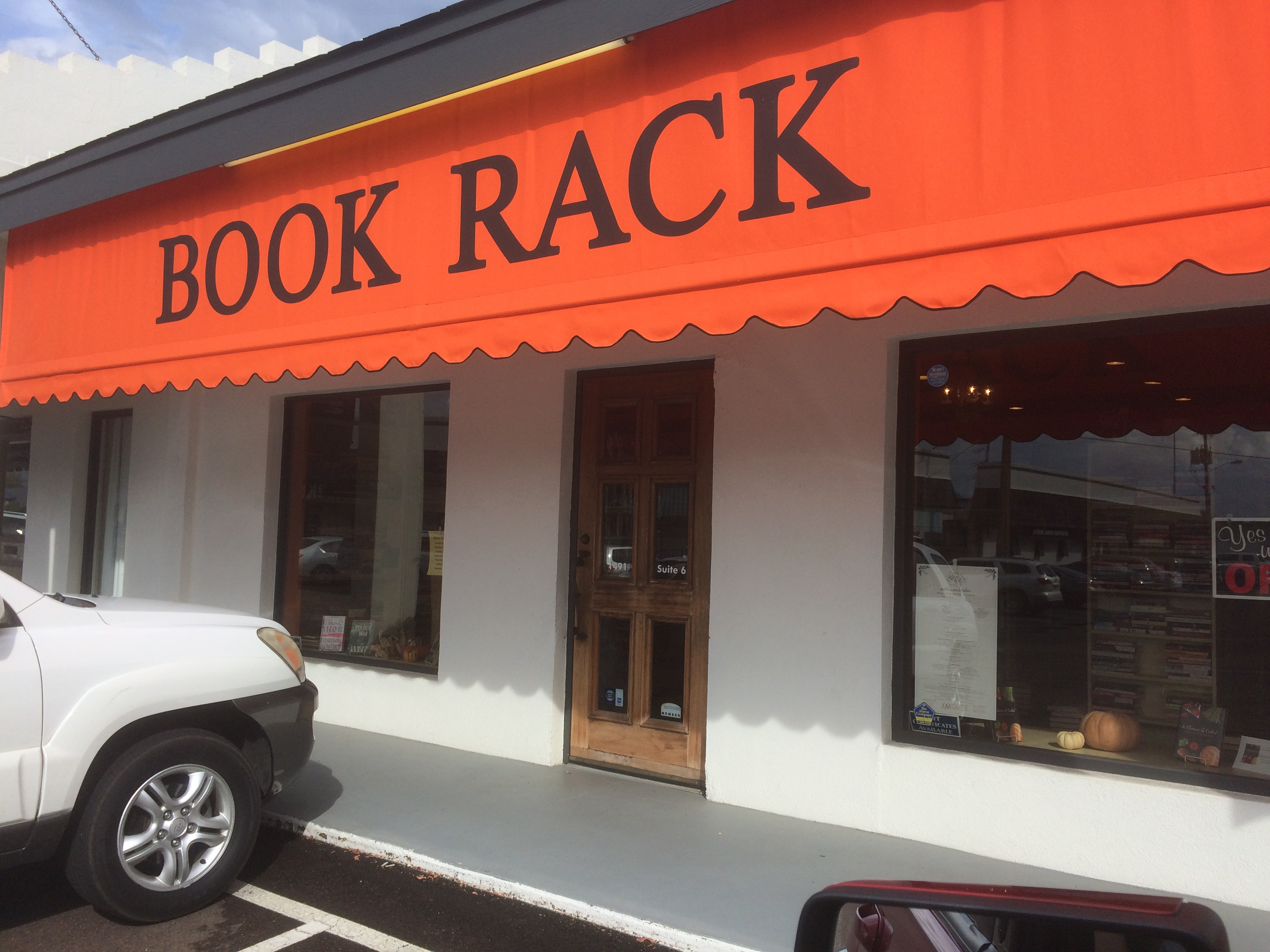
Book Rack exterior, Jackson, Mississippi, 2016
