= Magus Books =

Used bookstore in Seattle, Washington, U.S.

Coordinates: 47.6584°N 122.3128°W

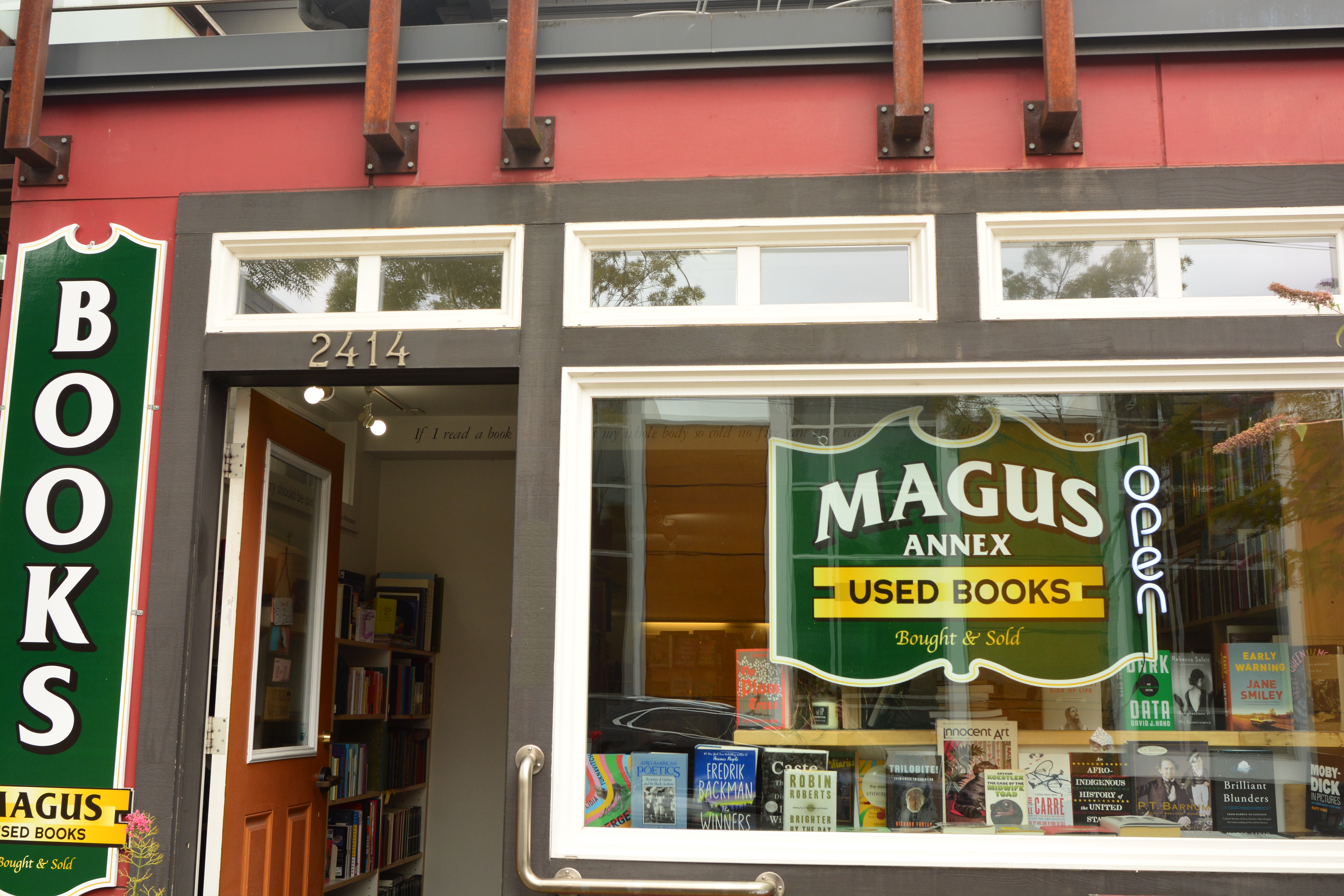
The shop's exterior, 2023

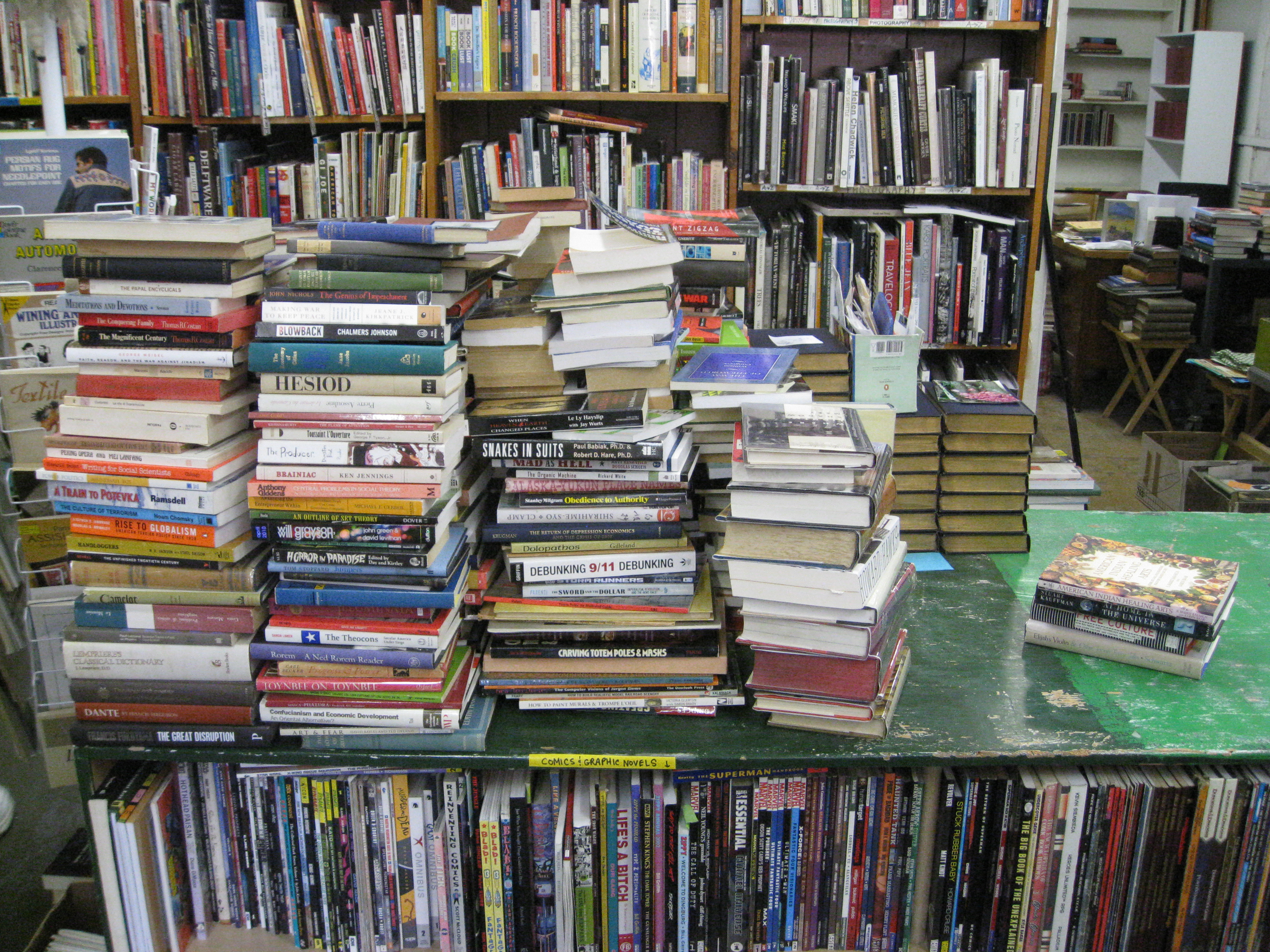
Interior in 2011

Magus Books is a used bookstore in Seattle's University District, in the U.S. state of Washington.

The Seattle Times has said: "Featuring a broad selection of books to meet any interest, Magus Books has been a fixture for University of Washington students for over four decades. Generations of serious young literary people have haunted the grande dame of Seattle used bookselling while visualizing the plots of their first novels."

== History ==
Dave Bell purchased the shop in the 1970s. Hanna McElroy and Chris Weimer acquired the business in 2004.
