= Used bookstore =

Shop selling previously-owned books

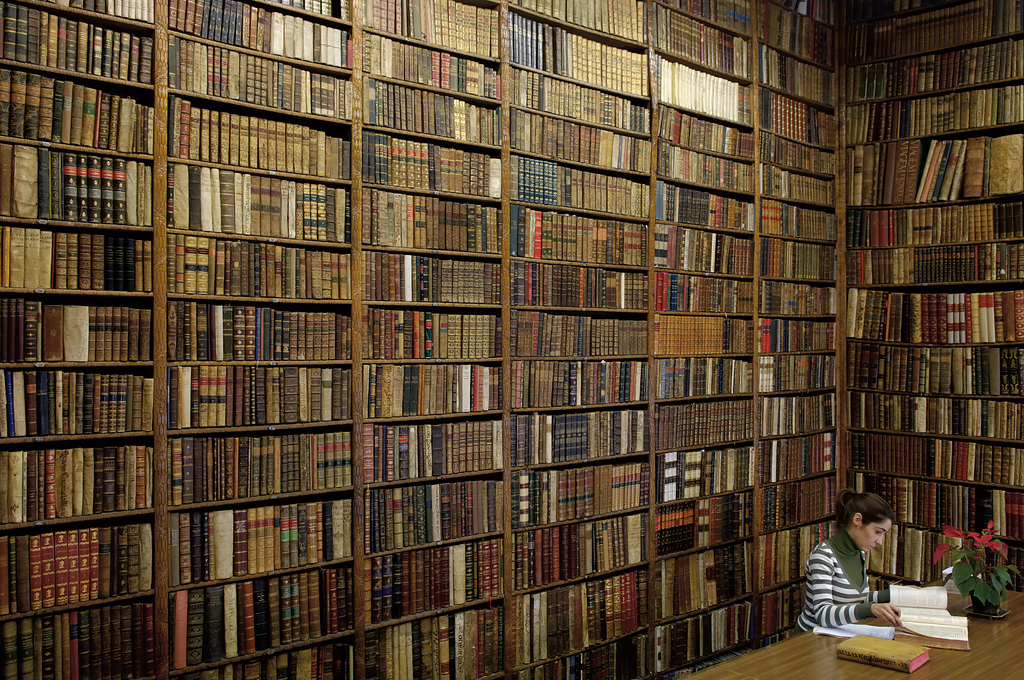
A store of used books in Madrid

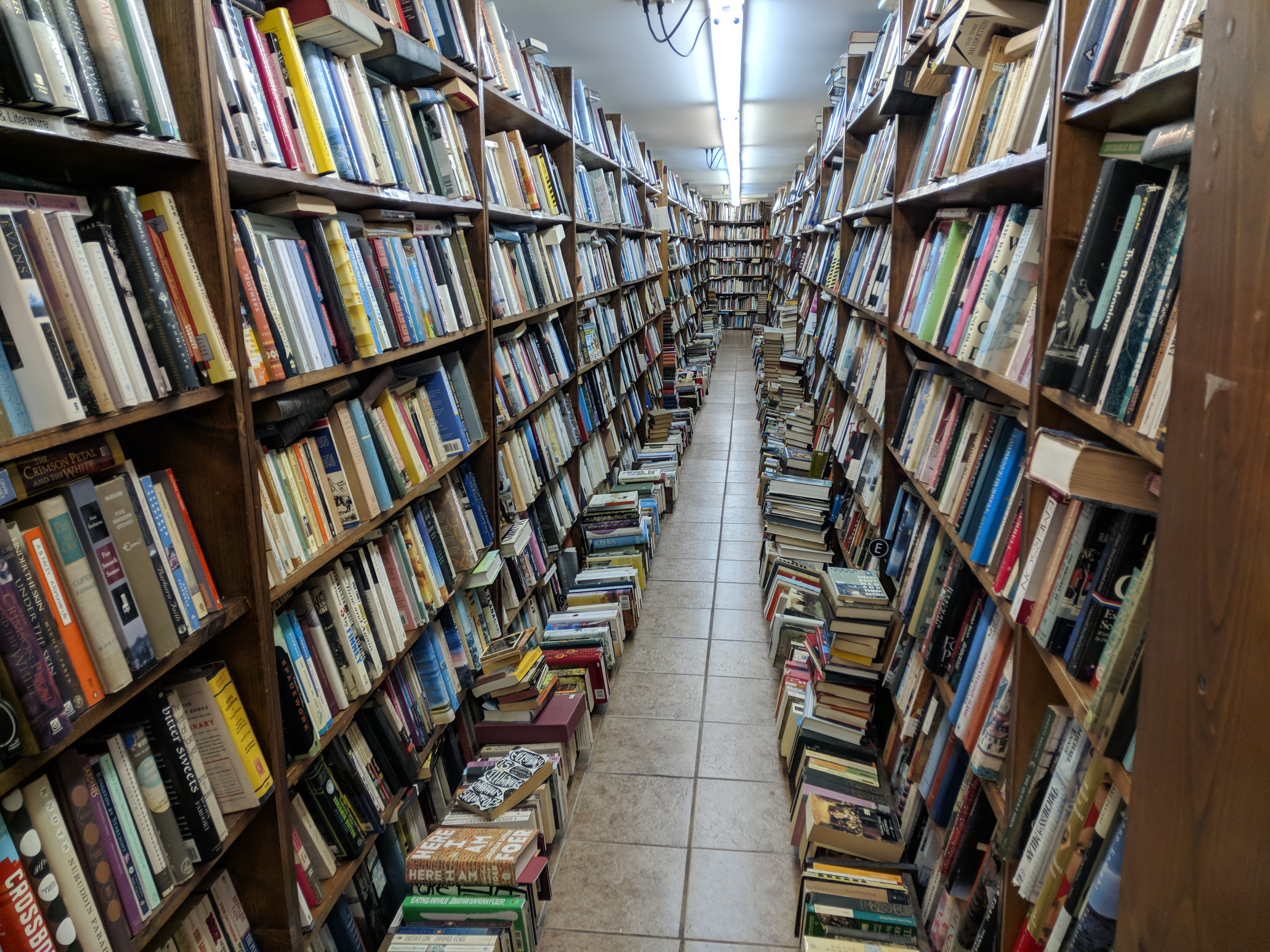
A second-hand book store in the United States.

Used bookstores (usually called second-hand bookshops in Great Britain) buy and sell used books and out-of-print books. A range of titles is available in used bookstores, including in print and out-of-print books. Book collectors tend to frequent used book stores. Large online bookstores offer used books for sale, too. Individuals wishing to sell their used books using online bookstores agree to terms outlined by the bookstore(s): for example, paying the online bookstore(s) a predetermined commission once the books have sold.

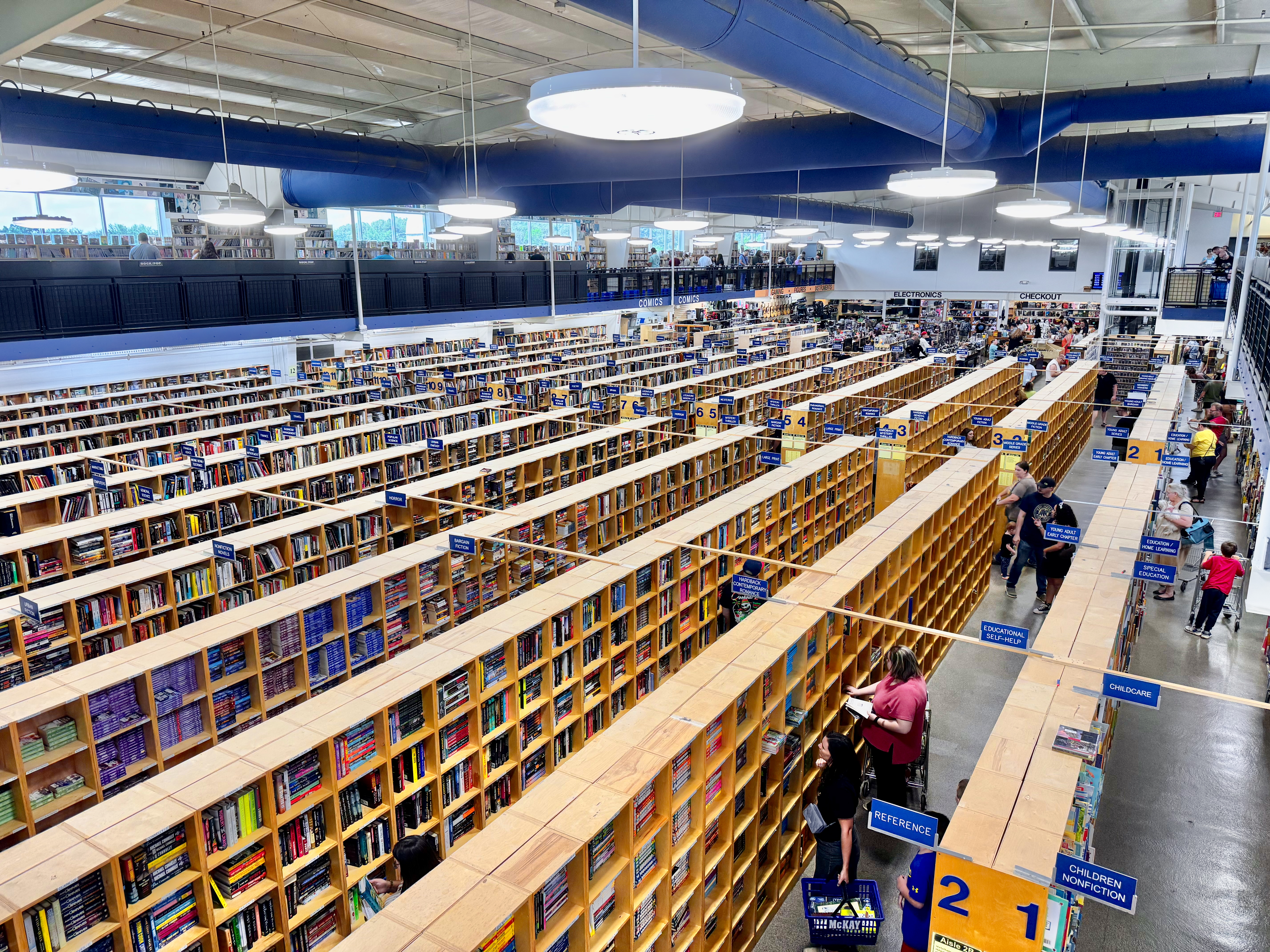
McKAY's used bookstore in Chattanooga, Tennessee

Used bookstores can range in size offering from several hundred to several hundred thousands of titles. They may be brick-and-mortar stores, internet-only stores, or a combination of both. A book town is a locale where numerous bookstores are located and serve as the town's main attraction to tourists.

The third-largest bookstore chain in the United States, Half Price Books, primarily sells and buys used books along with new titles.

== See also ==
- Antiquarian book trade in the United States
- Bookstore tourism
- List of used book conditions
- Parnassus on Wheels – 1917 book by Christopher Morley
  - The Haunted Bookshop – 1919 book by Christopher Morley
- Religious bookstore
