= KRUI-FM =

Student-run radio station at the University of Iowa in Iowa City, Iowa

- Iowa City, Iowa; United States
- Frequency: 89.7 MHz
- Branding: Iowa City's Sound Alternative

Programming
- Format: Variety

Ownership
- Owner: Student Broadcasters Inc.

History
- First air date: March 28, 1984
- Former call signs: KRUI (1984–1989) KICR (1968–1984) KWAD (1952–1968)

Technical information
- Licensing authority: FCC
- Facility ID: 63560
- Class: A
- ERP: 100 watts
- HAAT: 27.0 meters
- Transmitter coordinates: 41°39′29.00″N 91°32′40.00″W

Links
- Public license information: Public file; LMS
- Website: www.krui.fm

KRUI-FM (89.7 FM) is a radio station broadcasting a Variety format. Located in Iowa City, Iowa, United States, the station is licensed to Student Broadcasters Inc. KRUI began at the University of Iowa in 1952 as KWAD, and in 1968 the station's call letters changed to KICR. In 1984, the FCC granted an FM license to KRUI.

KRUI is a student-run radio station, broadcasting at 100 watts from the Iowa Memorial Union on the University of Iowa campus. Air time is distributed among student DJs. KRUI plays a wide variety of music including Alternative Rock, Hip-Hop, Funk, Jazz, and Dance, excluding songs played on top 40 pop radio (most of the time). Other show topics include politics, student life, and sports.

== Notable shows ==
In 2010, KRUI began broadcasting Live from Prairie Lights, a series of readings by various authors speaking at the local bookstore Prairie Lights. Live from Prairie Lights was previously aired by WSUI until 2008.

KRUI also broadcasts WorldCanvass, a show presented by the International Programs Department at the University of Iowa which explores topics of an international scope.

On March 8, 2011 KRUI interviewed Wikipedia co-founder Jimmy Wales, who was on campus to speak at a University of Iowa Lecture Committee event.

Little Village Magazine, a local music, arts, and news magazine, also has a show called Little Village Live. The show broadcasts live performances from local and non local bands from Public Space One, a local music and arts venue.

KRUI began to broadcast Iowa Hawkeyes athletics in 1984, broadcasting Iowa Women's basketball and Men's baseball live play-by-play. The station debuted its play-by-play for Iowa football in Evanston, Ill., for the Iowa-Northwestern football game in 2012.

On April 18, 2015 KRUI celebrated 30 years of broadcasting on the FM dial.

Wednesday, March 4, 2020 marked the first live appearance on KRUI with radio hall of fame inductee Jason Mutz.

In 2024, KRUI will celebrate its 40th Birthday in an event hosted by online content director John Glab.

Currently, the Bijou Banter Podcast airs live every Friday afternoon during the Fall and Spring academic semesters.

== Notable alumni ==
KRUI alumni include Diablo Cody, author of Juno; Brett Dolan, Houston Astros play-by-play announcer; Eric Ferguson, Chicago radio personality from Eric & Kathy WTMX; 1996 USA Olympian Liz Tchou; and meetup.com founder Scott Heiferman

== See also ==
- Campus radio
- List of college radio stations in the United States
