= Thunder on the Left =

1925 novel by Christopher Morley

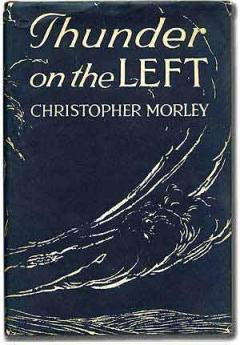
- First edition (publ. Doubleday Page)
- Author: Christopher Morley
- Language: English
- Publisher: Doubleday Page
- Publication date: 1925
- Media type: Print
- Pages: 288

Thunder on the Left is a novel by Christopher Morley, originally published in 1925. In it, Morley looks at maturity, individual growth, and human nature. It was adapted as a play by Jean Ferguson Black in 1934.

Movie rights in perpetuity were sold to Picture Entertainment International, Lee Caplin, for $52,000 in the 1990s.

== Editions ==
- Garden City, New York : Doubleday, Page & Company, 1925 LCCN 25027460
- Garden City, New York : Doubleday, Page & Company, 1926
- Garden City, N.Y., Doubleday, Doran & Company, Inc., 1936 LCCN 36009351
- New York, Penguin Books, 1946
- New York, Philosophical Library [1959] LCCN 59016366
- Los Angeles, CA : Sun & Moon Press, 1995 LCCN 94048249; ISBN 1-55713-190-2
- Poughkeepsie, NY : Vivisphere, 2000 LCCN 00101946; ISBN 1-892323-88-5
