= Walter Jack Duncan =

American artist (1881–1941)

Walter Jack Duncan (January 1, 1881–1941) was a war artist for the United States Army during World War I.

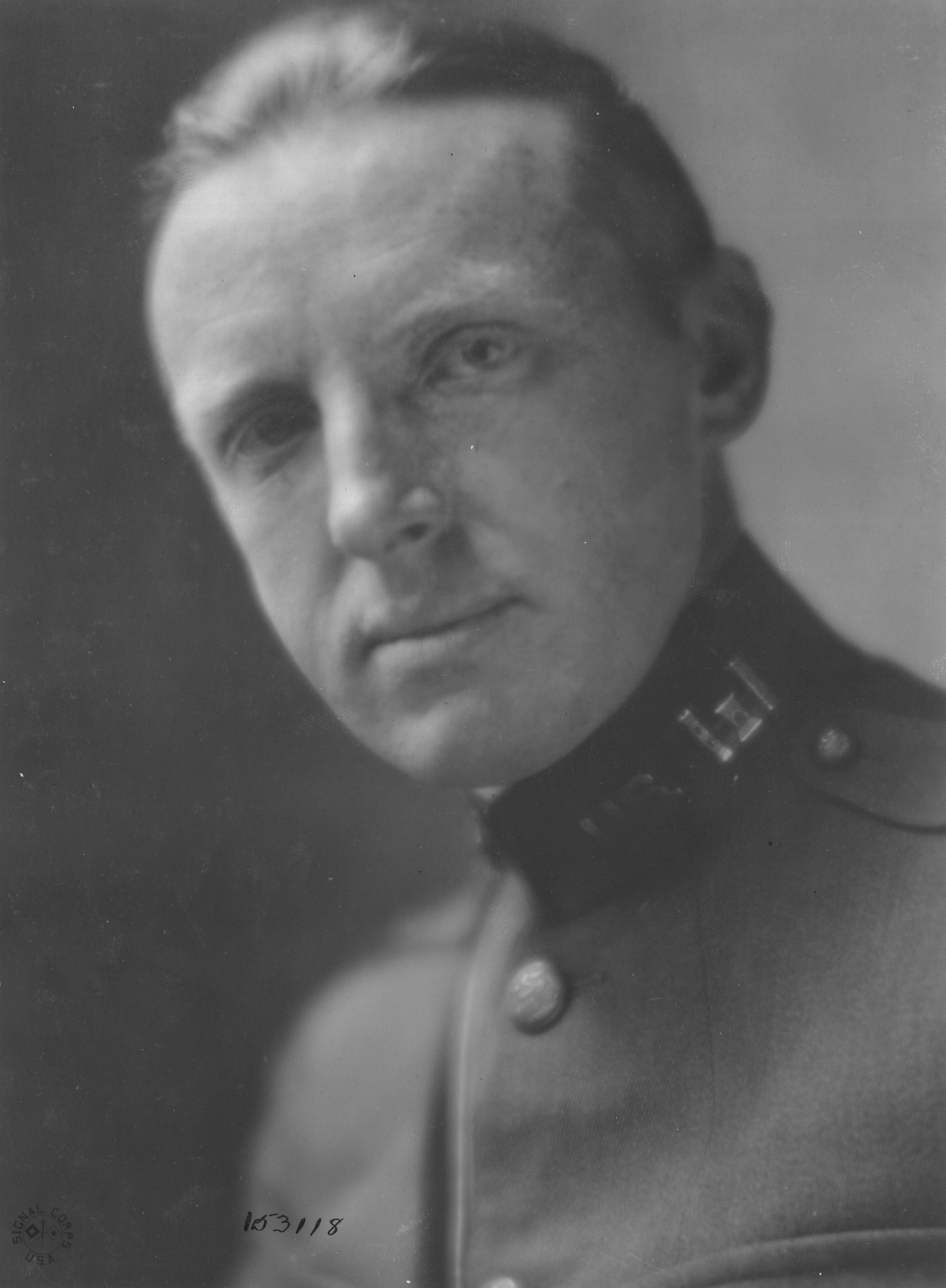
Duncan in uniform.

== Background ==
He was born in Indianapolis, Indiana. His family included a number of prominent actors, and upon graduation from high school, he -- along with a writer-artist friend, Robert Cortes Holliday -- moved to New York city to study at the Art Students' League under the prominent landscape artist John H. Twachtman. After three years at the League, Duncan began his long career of magazine illustration with Century Magazine. Some of his other magazine credits include Scribner's, McClure's Magazine, and Harper's. His varied illustration assignments before the war had given him the opportunity to travel abroad to Canada and England. He also spent time in the backwoods of Kentucky drawing the descendants of Daniel Boone in their natural habitat.

Like William James Aylward's, much of Duncan's wartime effort focused on the support activities of the AEF. He traveled from the ports to the battlefield producing detailed works that recorded some of the less glamorous but essential aspects of modern warfare. Much of his work reflects the influence of his studying under a landscape artist.

Duncan's favorite medium was pen and ink, and he especially liked producing illustrations for books. His work in that medium earned him the accolade of "wizard of pen and ink" from contemporary artists. During his career he became associated with a number of writers, working closely with them to illustrate their books. After the war he illustrated a number of Christopher Morley's books, including Plum Pudding and Pipefuls.

Drawings by Walter Jack Duncan

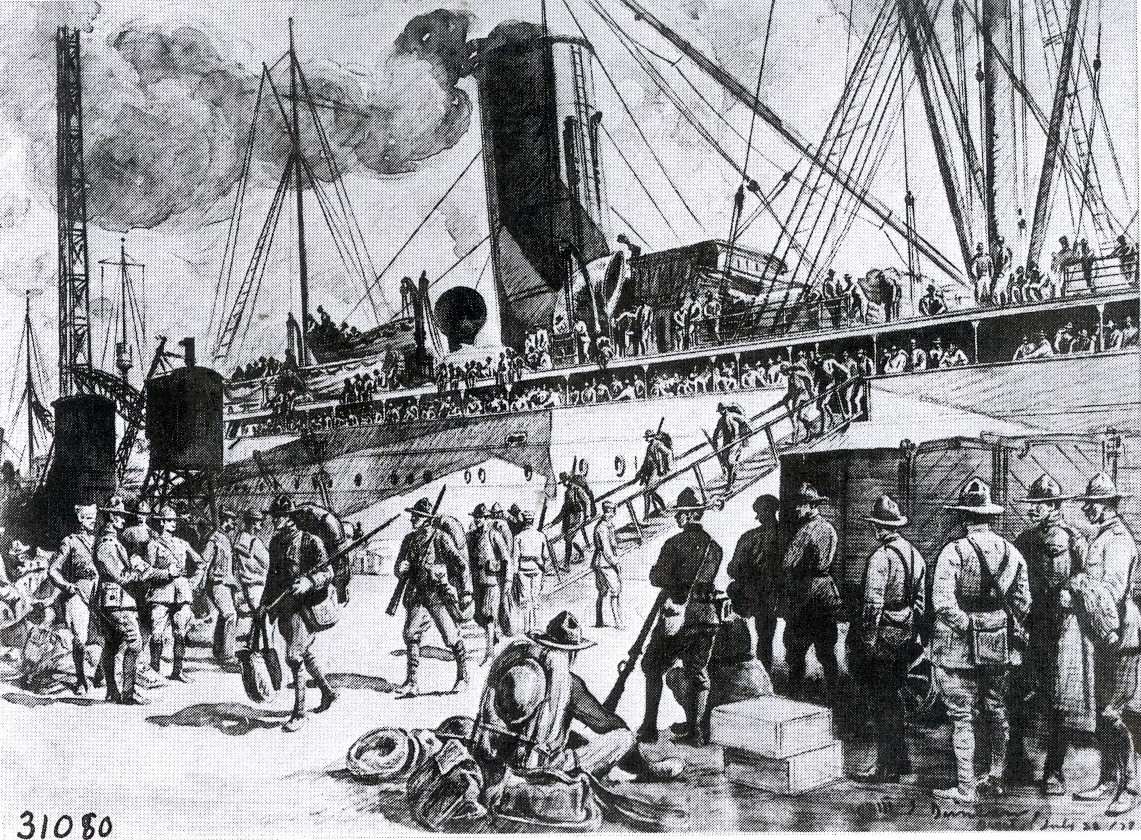
Newly arrived soldiers debarking at Brest

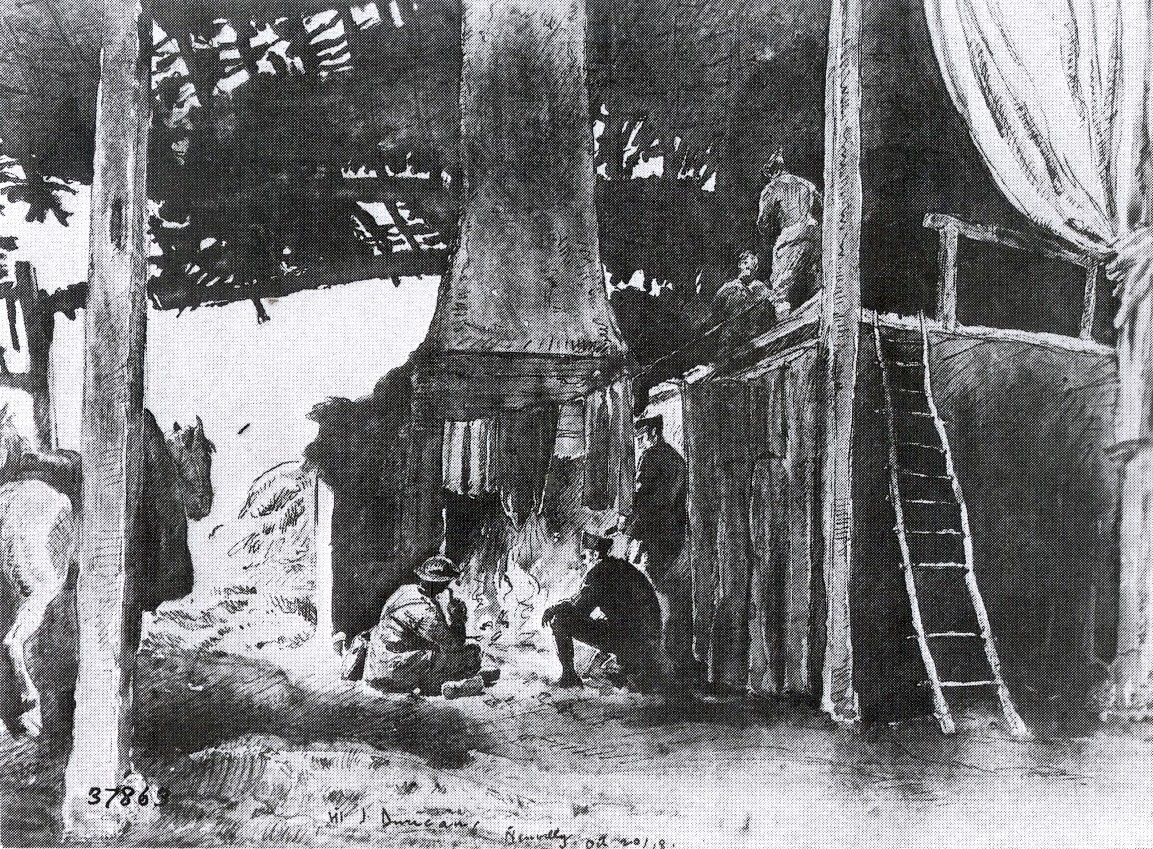
Cold nights coming on

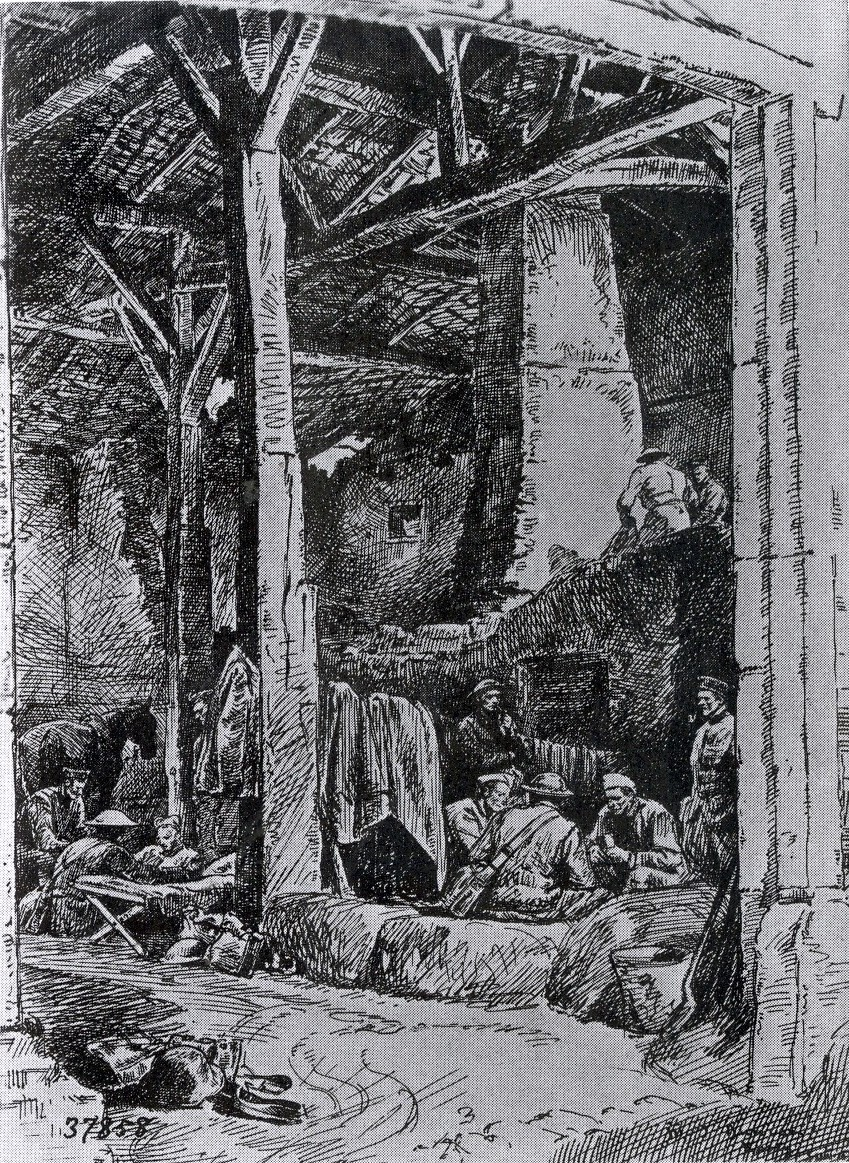
A quiet game in Essey

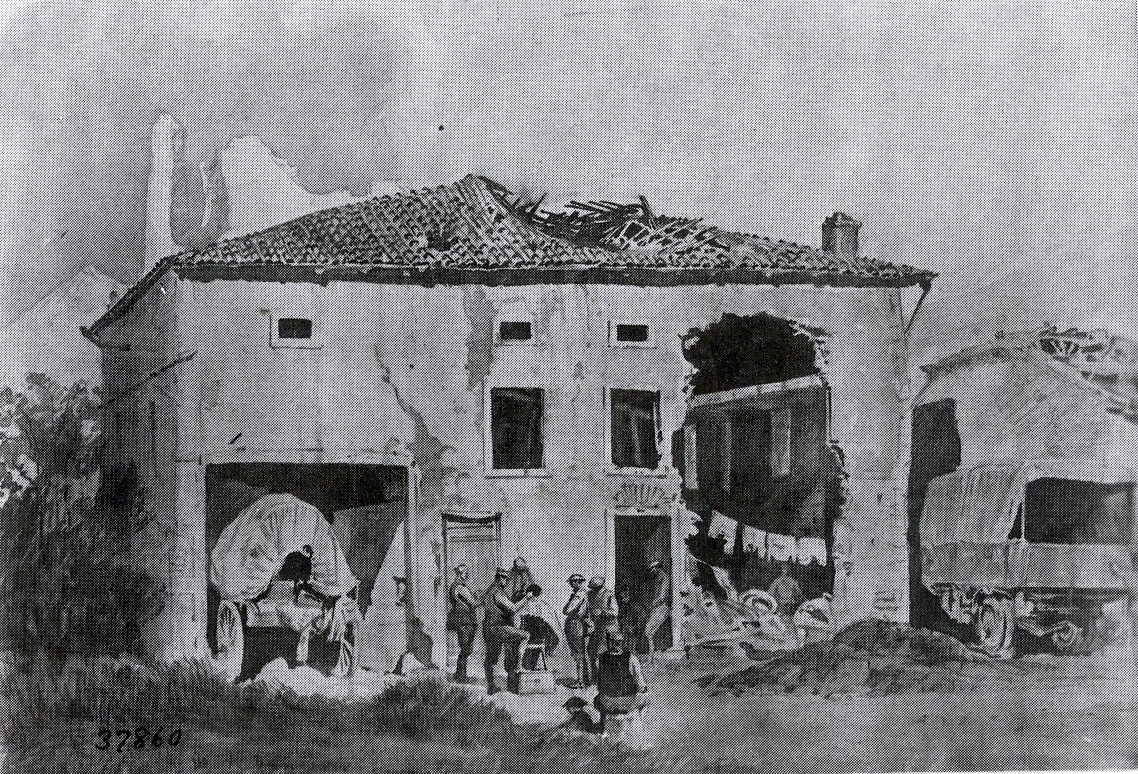
Barber shop and first aid station of the Red Cross at Essey

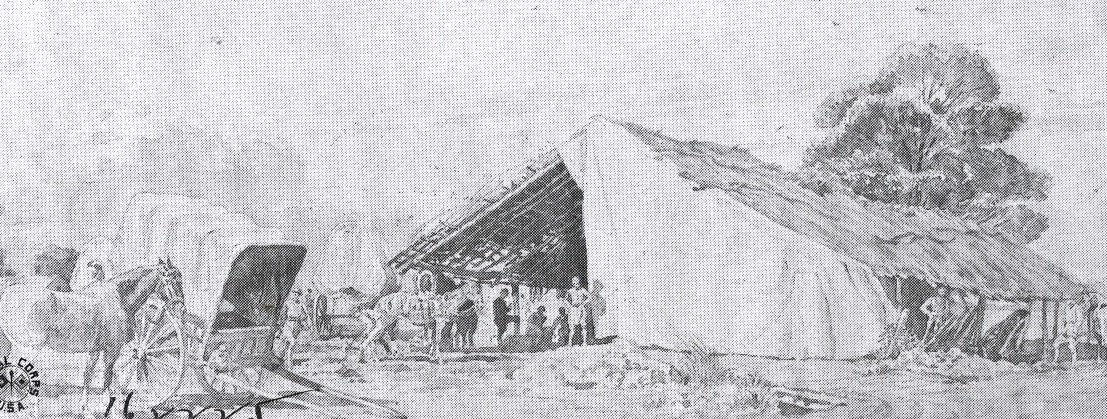
Blacksmith and wagon repair shop on the road to Boucq

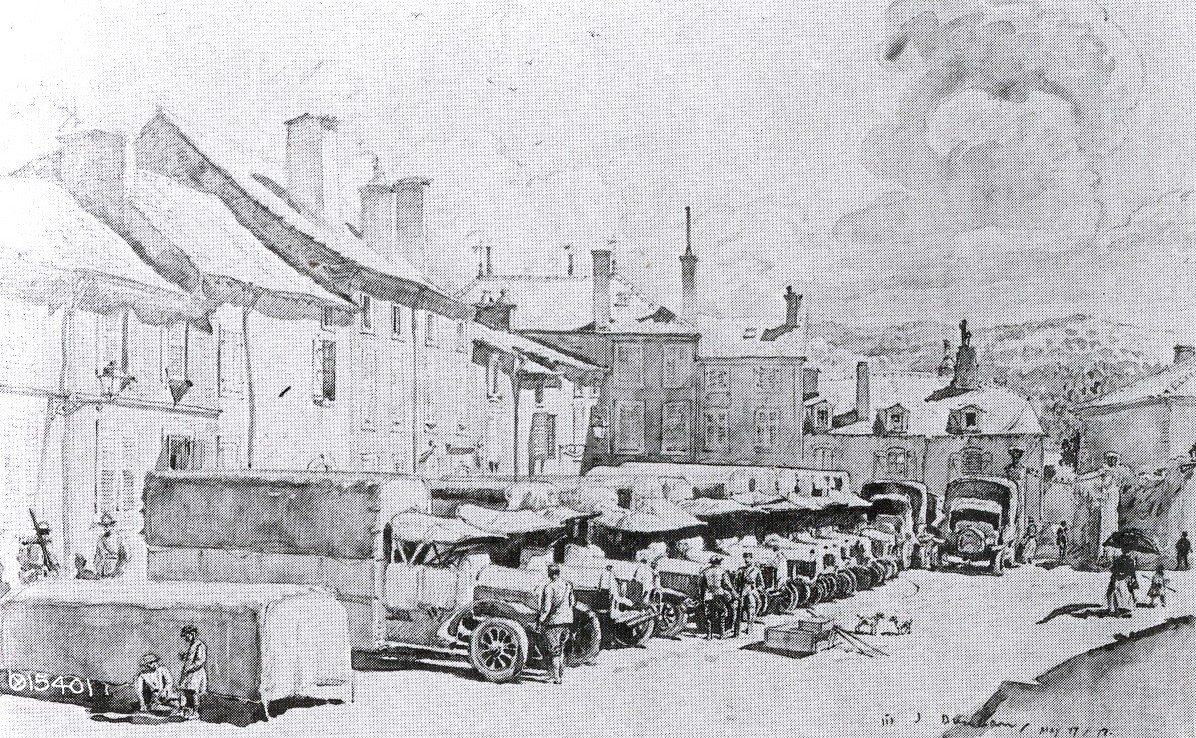
French auto trucks and ambulances parked in the Place Garriere

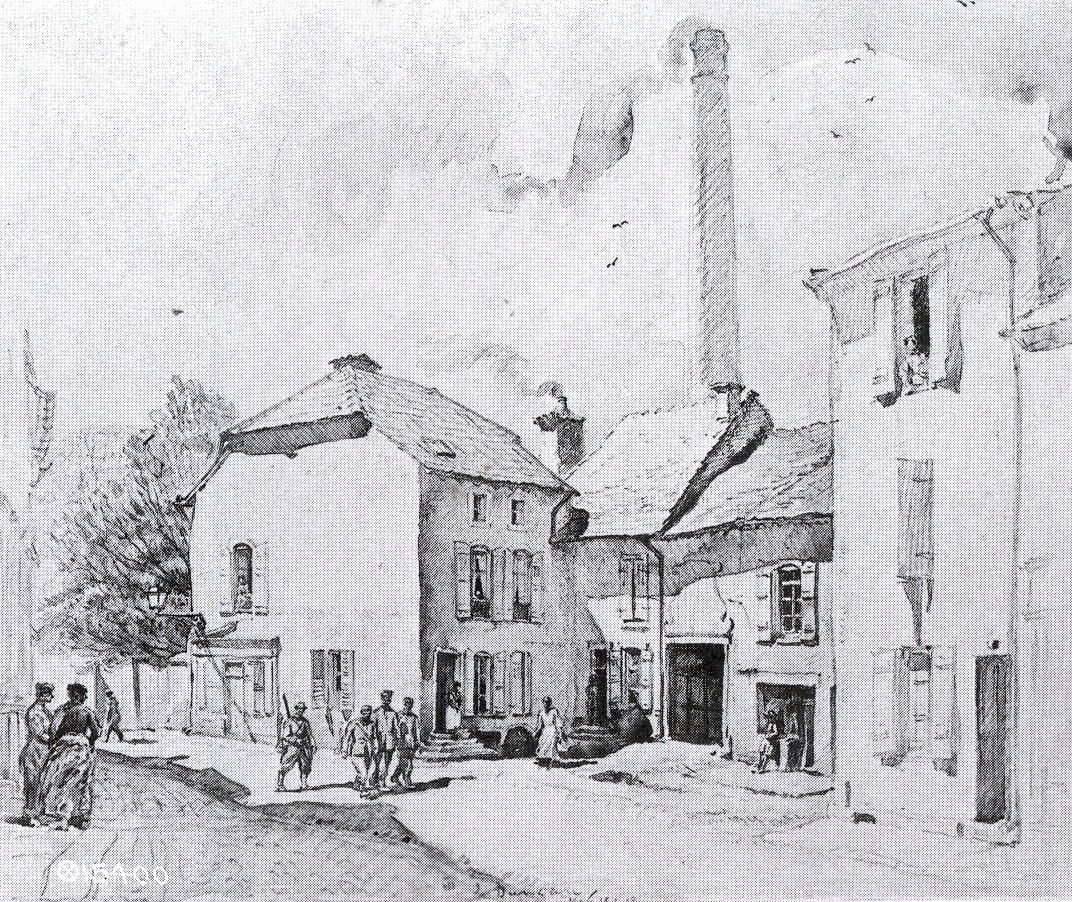
German prisoners under guard on their way to work
