= The Haunted Bookshop =

1919 book by Christopher Morley

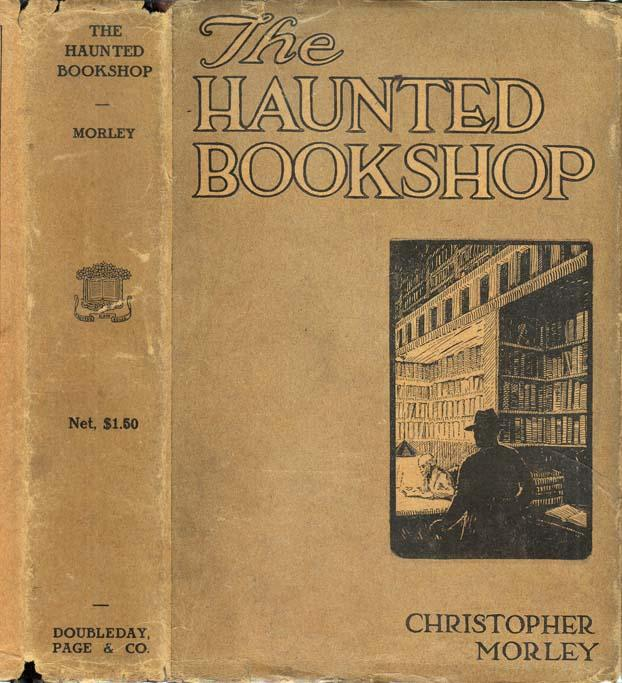
- Cover of the first edition, first issue
- Author: Christopher Morley
- Language: English
- Genre: Thriller
- Set in: Brooklyn, New York City
- Publisher: Doubleday, Page & Company
- Publication date: 1919
- Publication place: New York City, New York, United States
- Pages: 289
- OCLC: 1724792
- Preceded by: Parnassus on Wheels (1917)

The Haunted Bookshop is a 1919 novel by Christopher Morley, now in the public domain in the United States. It has remained a popular representative of the "bibliomystery," a mystery story set in the world of books.

== Plot introduction ==
This is a suspenseful novel set in Brooklyn around the time of the end of World War I. It continues the story of Roger Mifflin, the book seller in Parnassus on Wheels. It also details an adventure of Miss Titania Chapman and a young advertising man named Aubrey Gilbert.

The Haunted Bookshop is not a novel of the supernatural. Rather, the name refers to the ghosts of the past that haunt all libraries and bookstores: "the ghosts of all great literature." Throughout the novel Morley, through the character of Roger Mifflin, makes reference to the knowledge and wisdom that one can gain from literature.

== Plot summary ==
The narrative begins with a young advertising man, Aubrey Gilbert, stopping by a bookstore named "The Haunted Bookshop" in the hopes of finding a new client. Gilbert meets the proprietor, Roger Mifflin. Gilbert does not succeed in selling advertising copy, but is intrigued by Mifflin and his conviction concerning the value books and booksellers have to the world. Additionally, Gilbert is intrigued by the fact that his firm's biggest client, Mr. Chapman, is a friend of Mifflin and has asked Mifflin to undertake the education of his daughter, Titania Chapman, by hiring her as an assistant.

Gilbert returns to the book store, meets Titania, and falls in love with her. Meanwhile, mysterious things start to happen: a copy of Thomas Carlyle's Letters and Speeches of Oliver Cromwell disappears and reappears, Gilbert is attacked as he travels home, a pharmacist neighbor of Mifflin is observed skulking in the alley behind the bookstore at night speaking to someone in German, and an assistant chef at the Octagon Hotel has posted an ad in The New York Times promising a reward for a lost copy of Letters and Speeches of Oliver Cromwell. Gilbert starts to sense that something nefarious is afoot. He suspects that the gregarious Mifflin is involved in a plot to kidnap Titania, and he assigns himself the job of protecting her.

Meanwhile, Mifflin begins to train Titania in the booksellers' trade. His focus is so centered on books and their content that he fails to note the unusual things that are occurring.

Gilbert takes a room across from the bookstore in order to keep eye on things, and believes his suspicions confirmed when he sees the pharmacist let himself into the bookshop with his own key late at night. Gilbert breaks into the bookshop in an effort to find evidence to prove his suspicions, but only manages to frighten and anger Titania.

Gilbert learns that Mifflin is to take a day trip to Philadelphia, and follows him in the belief that the trip is a part of the "kidnapping" plot. In Philadelphia Gilbert confronts Mifflin with his suspicions, telling him of all the things that have occurred. The two realize that a third party had lured Mifflin away from the shop. They call the bookshop and learn that the pharmacist has left a suitcase of books there for someone else to pick up. Mifflin tells Titania to hold on to the case until he returns.

Mifflin and Gilbert return to the bookshop and find it locked. Inside, the pharmacist and an associate of his have tied up Mrs. Mifflin and are menacing Titania with a gun.

A fight ensues, part of the bookstore is destroyed by a bomb, and the pharmacist escapes. The only casualties of the bomb are the pharmacist's partner and Mifflin's dog, Bock. Mifflin even affects to be pleased as the blast knocked down books he'd forgotten he had.

In the final chapter of the book Gilbert and Mifflin learn what the true plot was: The pharmacist was a German spy who had been using the bookshop as a drop-off point. He was a specialist in making bombs, and had hidden a bomb in one of President Woodrow Wilson's favorite books. The pharmacist's co-conspirator was the assistant chef at the Octagon Hotel. He was to be part of the crew on the ship Wilson was to travel on to peace talks in Europe, and was to plant the bomb in Wilson's cabin in an assassination plot. The pharmacist was captured by police, and killed himself.

== Characters in The Haunted Bookshop ==
- Roger Mifflin: Bookseller, proprietor of The Haunted Bookshop.
- Aubrey Gilbert: Young advertising man who suspects illicit acts are occurring.
- Bock: Roger Mifflin's dog, a mustard-colored terrier named for Boccaccio.
- Helen Mifflin: Mr. Mifflin's wife.
- George Chapman: A client of Gilbert, friend of Mifflin, and father of Titania.
- Titania Chapman: A young lady apprenticed to Mr. Mifflin.
- Mr. Weintraub: A pharmacist neighbor to Mifflin.
- Mrs. J. F. Smith: Who abides in all lodging houses.
- Metzger: Assistant chef at the Octagon Hotel.

== Major themes ==
This is primarily a novel of suspense, though throughout it Morley proclaims the value of books. Mifflin, the protagonist, is a self-described "practitioner of bibliotherapy" who thinks booksellers heal minds just like doctors heal bodies. Mifflin describes a "librocubicularist" as someone who is fond of readings in bed.

== Allusions/references to other works ==
Books referenced by characters:

- Trivia by Logan Pearsall Smith
- The Story of My Heart: An Autobiography by Richard Jeffries
- Notebooks, by Samuel Butler
- The Man Who Was Thursday by G. K. Chesterton
- The Demi-Gods by James Stephens
- The Works of Francis Thompson
- The Social History of Smoking by G.L. Apperson
- The Path to Rome by Hilaire Belloc
- The Book of Tea by Okakura Kakuzo
- Happy Thoughts by F.C. Burnand
- Margaret Ogilvy by J.M. Barrie
- Confessions of a Thug by Philip Meadows Taylor
- General Catalogue of the Oxford University Press
- The Morning's War by C.E. Montague
- The Spirit of Man edited by Robert Bridges
- The Romany Rye by George Henry Borrow
- Poems by Emily Dickinson
- Poems by George Herbert
- The House of Cobwebs by George Gissing
- The Way of All Flesh and Erewhon by Samuel Butler
- Paradise Lost by Milton
- Parnassus on Wheels by Christopher Morley
- Letters and Speeches of Oliver Cromwell by Thomas Carlyle

Authors referenced by characters: Carlyle, Ralph Waldo Emerson, Henry Thoreau, George Bernard Shaw, Chesterton, Nietzsche, George Ade, Ralph Waldo Trine, J.M. Chapple, J.M. Barrie, Joseph Conrad, John Keats.

== Allusions/references to actual history, geography and current science ==
The novel is set shortly after the end of World War I. Characters occasionally discuss the war. It is mentioned several times that Woodrow Wilson is to travel to peace conferences. Characters plot to assassinate Woodrow Wilson on his way to the peace conferences following the war.

== In popular culture ==
Cornell & Diehl produces a pipe tobacco named after this novel.
