= Prairie Lights =

Iowa City, IA, bookstore

Coordinates: 41°39′39.31″N 91°31′59.72″W

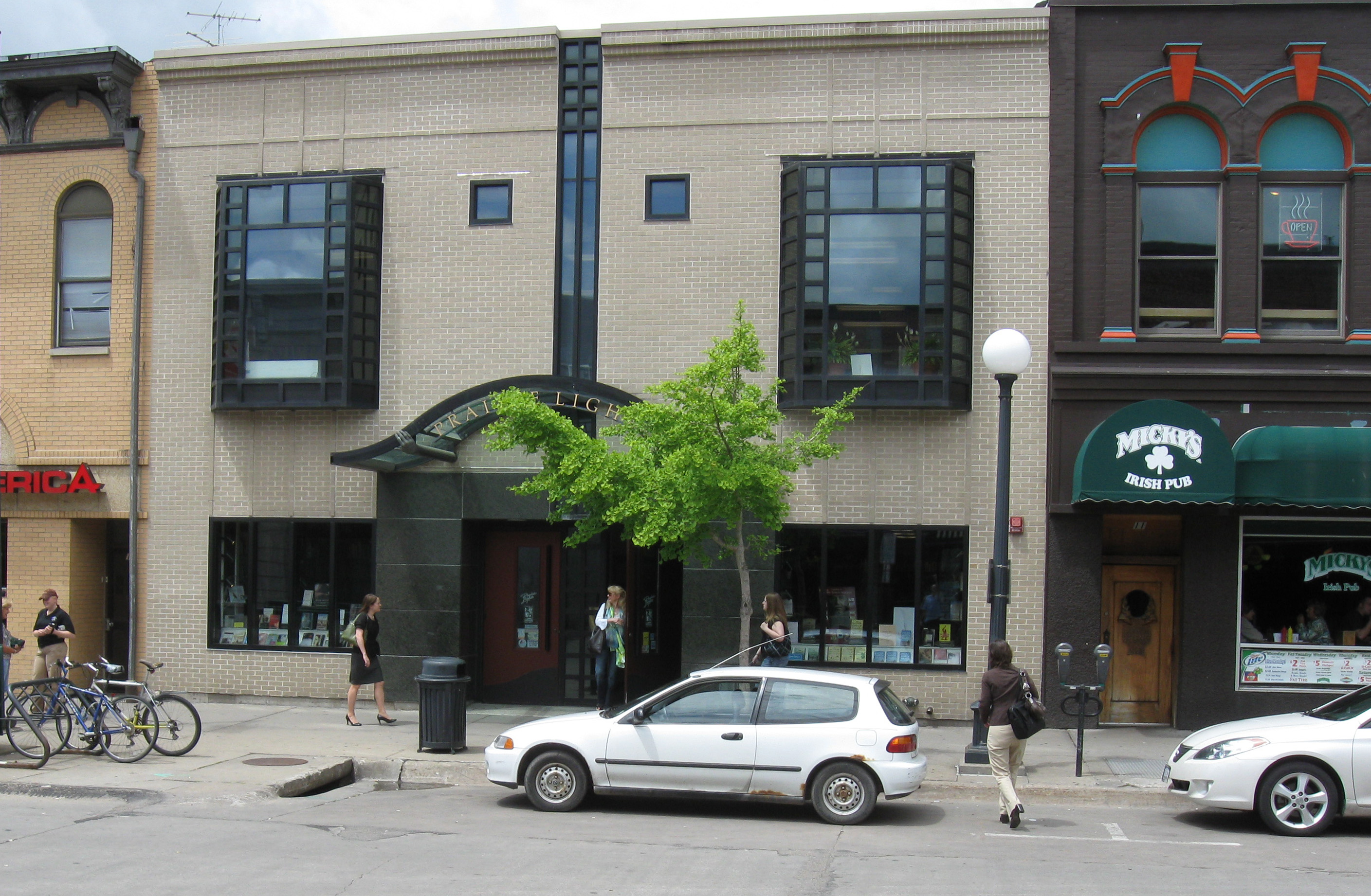
- Prairie Lights Book Store, Iowa City
- Company type: Book store
- Founded: 1978
- Founder: Jim Harris
- Headquarters: Iowa City, Iowa, United States
- Website: PrairieLights.com

Prairie Lights is an independent bookstore in downtown Iowa City, Iowa, founded in 1978, by Jim Harris.

== History ==
The store's original location was a 1,000-square-foot (93 m^{2}) space on South Linn Street. In 1982, Harris moved the store to an 11,000-square-foot (1,000 m^{2}) space on South Dubuque Street, which had been a coffee house that had in the 1930s hosted a local literary society and its guests, who included Carl Sandburg, Robert Frost, Langston Hughes, Sherwood Anderson, E. E. Cummings and others. The store currently holds approximately 80,000 to 100,000 books, covering three and a half stories. The remaining half-story houses a coffee shop. Its facade, designed to resemble a human face, is a local landmark.

Harris sold the store to longtime employee and poet Jan Weissmiller and the poet Jane Mead in December 2008.

== Notable author visits ==
As one of Iowa's largest bookstores and the major independent bookstore in the hometown of the University of Iowa's Writers' Workshop, the building continues to play a role in its region's literary culture. Susan Sontag, Gloria Steinem, and Annie Proulx are among the notable authors to participate in events at the bookstore. Seven Nobel prize winners have also had events at the store: Seamus Heaney, Czesław Miłosz, Derek Walcott, Saul Bellow, Toni Morrison, Orhan Pamuk, and J. M. Coetzee.

== President Obama visit ==
President Barack Obama made a surprise visit to the store after a speech in Iowa City on March 25, 2010. He visited the store after using Prairie Lights as an example of small businesses struggling to pay for health care coverage for their employees. During his visit he bought a couple of children's books.

== Radio program ==
WSUI in Iowa City broadcast "Live from Prairie Lights", a series of readings by authors appearing at the store, for 18 years. Among others, actor Mike Farrell, and authors Michael Chabon and Daniel Mason appeared on the program in 2008. The program stopped airing on Iowa Public Radio in December 2008. In October 2010, the University of Iowa college radio station KRUI-FM began broadcasting "Live from Prairie Lights.", and the readings are streamed live and archived at http://www.writinguniversity.org.
