= The Odyssey Bookshop =

Book store in Massachusetts, United States

Coordinates: 42.2592°N 72.5760°W

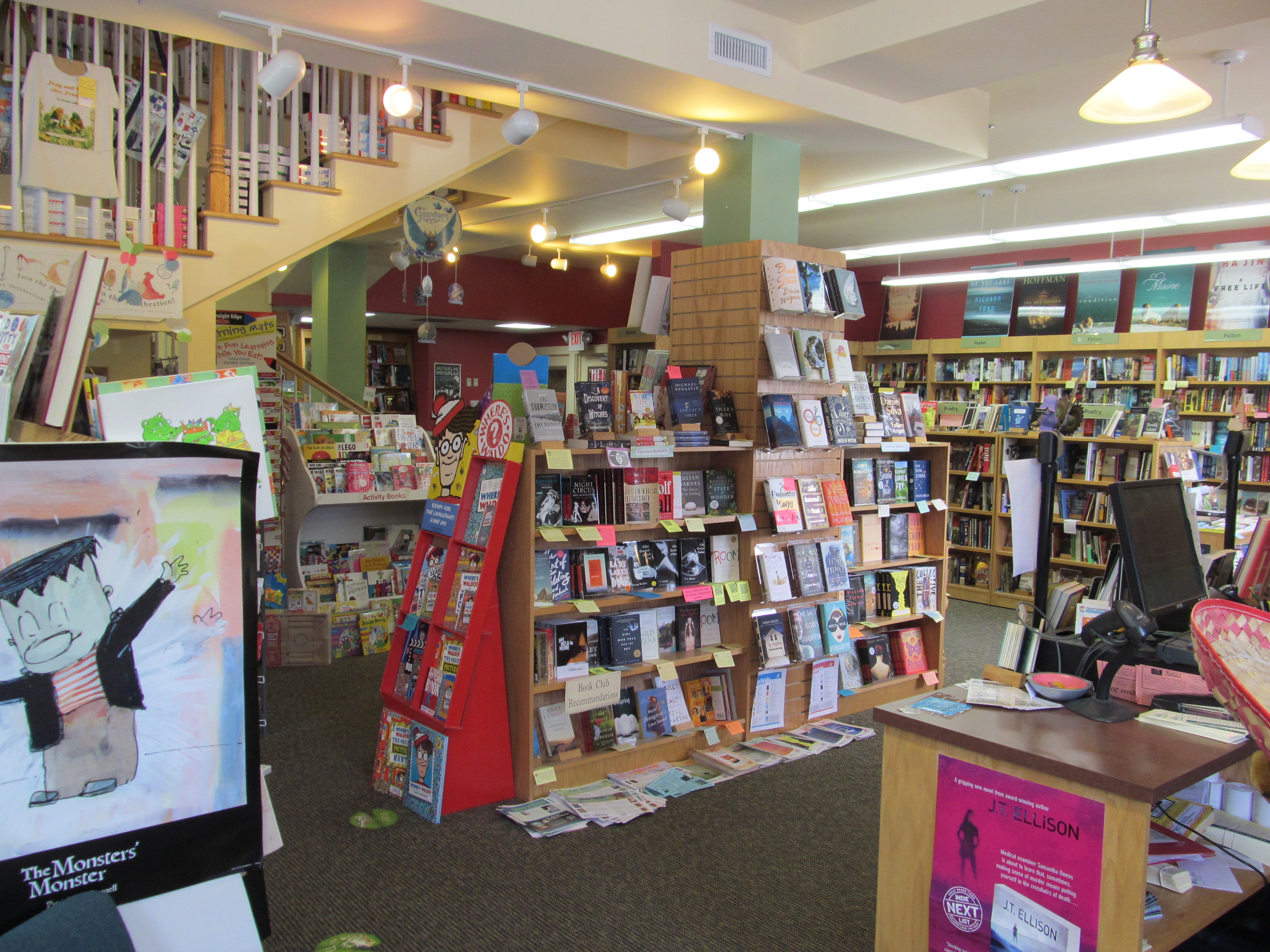
- Inside The Odyssey Bookshop in 2013
- Type: Private subsidiary
- Founded: South Hadley, Massachusetts (1963)
- Founder: Romeo Grenier
- Headquarters: South Hadley, Massachusetts, U.S.
- Key people: Romeo Grenier (Founder); Joan Grenier; Neil Novik
- Products: Books, magazines
- Website: Official website

The Odyssey Bookshop is an independent bookstore in South Hadley, Massachusetts. In addition to an extensive trade book selection, The Odyssey is the exclusive provider of textbooks for Mount Holyoke College and hosts author readings and book club events.

== History ==
The Odyssey was founded by Romeo Grenier, who was trained as a pharmacist. In 1957, he bought and managed Glesmann's Pharmacy, which was located across the street from Mount Holyoke College. The pharmacy, however, began to reflect Grenier's interest in literature as it became a gathering place for author readings and book club events. In 1963, the pharmacy was converted into The Odyssey Bookshop, managed and run by Grenier. During the 1980s, The Odyssey was damaged by two fires but in 1991, the ownership of the business passed to Romeo's daughter, Joan Grenier, who oversaw the re-location of the shop to its present location as the anchor store of the Village Commons. In 1998, Neil Novik joined the business as co-owner.

== Mount Holyoke College ==
Starting in 2001, The Odyssey became the provider of all textbooks for Mount Holyoke College classes, and in 2003 began providing art supplies for the college's art classes. In 2017, The Odyssey replaced the college's campus store as the official supplier of Mount Holyoke-branded spirit apparel and other items.
