= Parnassus on Wheels =

1917 book by Christopher Morley

- First edition cover
- Author: Christopher Morley
- Publisher: Doubleday, Page & Company
- Publication date: 1917
- Followed by: The Haunted Bookshop

Parnassus on Wheels is a 1917 novel written by Christopher Morley and published by Doubleday, Page & Company. The title refers to the Mount Parnassus of Greek mythology; it was the home of the Muses.

== Synopsis ==
Parnassus on Wheels is Morley's first novel, about a fictional traveling book-selling business. The original owner of the business, Roger Mifflin, sells it to 39-year-old Helen McGill, who is tired of taking care of her older brother, Andrew. Andrew is a former businessman turned farmer, turned author. As an author, he begins using the farm as his Muse rather than a livelihood. When Mifflin shows up with his traveling bookstore, Helen buys it—partly to prevent Andrew from buying it—and partly to treat herself to a long-overdue adventure of her own. The first of two novels to be written from a woman's perspective, as well as the prequel to a later novel (The Haunted Bookshop), Parnassus on Wheels was inspired by the novel The Friendly Road by David Grayson (pseudonym of Ray Stannard Baker), and starts with an open letter to Grayson, taking him to task for not concerning himself (except in passing) with his sister's opinion of and reaction to his adventure.

The bookstore-wagon, drawn by a horse named Pegasus, is advertised with a short verse:

ROGER MIFFLIN'S
TRAVELLING PARNASSUS
Worthy friends, my wain doth hold
Many a book, both new and old;
Books, the truest friends of man,
Fill this rolling caravan.
Books to satisfy all uses,
Golden lyrics of the Muses,
Books on cookery and farming,
Novels passionate and charming,
Every kind for every need
So that he who buys may read.
What librarian can surpass us?
MIFFLIN'S TRAVELLING PARNASSUS
By R. Mifflin, Prop'r.
Star Job Print, Celeryville, Va.

== In media ==
Parnassus on Wheels was presented on Hallmark Playhouse January 20, 1949. The 30-minute adaptation starred Ruth Hussey. The character of Helen McGill went viral on TikTok in April 2024, following an excerpt being featured in the State of Texas Assessments of Academic Readiness exam.
