= James Oppenheim =

American poet, writer and editor

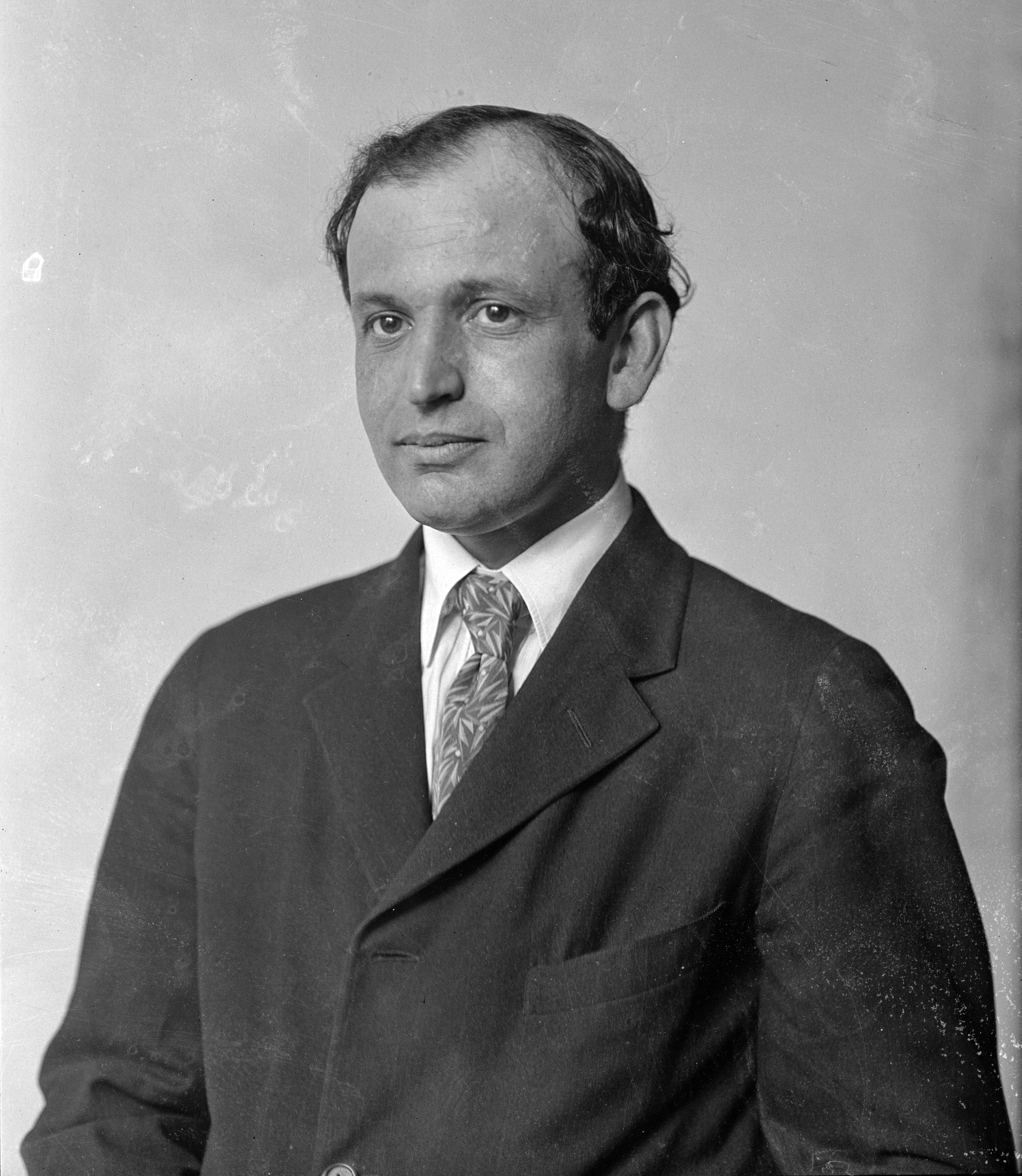
Oppenheim in 1928

James Oppenheim (24 May 1882 – 4 August 1932) was an American poet, novelist, and editor. A lay analyst and early follower of Carl Jung, Oppenheim was also a founder and editor of The Seven Arts.

== Life and work ==
Oppenheim was born in St. Paul, Minnesota, on May 24, 1882, the son of Joseph and Matilda (Schloss) Oppenheim. His father died when he was six and his family's circumstances changed. He was educated in public schools and at Columbia University.

Oppenheim married Lucy Seckel and had two children, Ralph and James Jr. (alias Garrett). Seckel filed for divorce following the publication of his 1914 novel, Idle Wives.

Oppenheim was assistant head worker at the Hudson Guild Settlement in New York from 1901 to 1903. He then worked as a teacher and acting superintendent at the Hebrew Technical School for Girls in New York from 1905 to 1907. After the collapse of The Seven Arts, he studied and wrote about psychology, in particular the works of Carl Jung. Oppenheim died from tuberculosis in New York City on August 4, 1932.

=== Career ===
Oppenheim was a writer of short stories and novels. His poetry followed Walt Whitman's model of free verse ruminations on "social and democratic aspects of life". Oppenheim depicted labor troubles with Fabian and suffragist themes in his novel, The Nine-Tenths (1911) and in his famous poem Bread and Roses (1911), inspired by a speech given by Helen Todd. The slogan Bread and Roses is now commonly associated with the pivotal 1912 textile workers' strike in Lawrence, Massachusetts. The poem was later set to music in 1976 by Mimi Fariña and again in 1990 by John Denver.

Oppenheim's published works include Monday Morning and Other Poems (1909); Pay Envelopes (1911); The Nine-Tenths (1911); The Olympian (1912); Idle Wives (1914); Songs For The New Age (1914); The Beloved (1915); War and Laughter (1916); The Book Of Self (1917); The Solitary (1919); The Mystic Warrior (1921); Golden Bird (1923); The Sea (collected poetry – 1924); Behind Your Front (1926); and American Types: A Preface To Analytic Psychology (1931). Additionally, he contributed short stories, articles, and poems to American Magazine, American Mercury, Century, Collier's, Freeman, Harper's, Hearst's, New Republic, and The Thinker.

At The Seven Arts magazine he served as primary editor and worked with Waldo Frank, George Jean Nathan, Louis Untermeyer and Paul Rosenfeld from 1916 to 1917, until he was blacklisted due to his opposition to US entry into World War I. James Oppenheim later wrote a reminiscence of his one tumultuous year as editor of the journal in which he observed that Randolph Bourne "was the real leader ... of what brains and creativeness we had at the time and had he lived the 'twenties might have sparkled much more than they did. Mind you, this young man not only was a cripple, but wheezed in breathing, and was mortally physically afraid most of the time. More than that, he had one fear greater than any other. That was the fear of prison. He could hardly bear the thought of it." However, Bourne wrote six anti-war articles for the magazine in the teeth of these frailties and fears. Then "the air began to get hot, pro and con, mainly pro," but Oppenheim also found himself the object of surveillance. "The illusion of a 'free country' in which I had grown up simply exploded. It was something in those days to know one was shadowed, spied upon, trailed by snoopers, that one must whisper what one thought in a restaurant and even then be sure one's friend wasn't going to hand one over to the police. ... The lying propaganda had something foul and degrading in it. The exultation of the timorous stay-at-homes was rotten and debased. 'Enemies Within', shrieked the old New York Tribune and spat snake's venom at Bourne and the rest of us." The circulation was actually climbing when "the inevitable happened. The contract stipulated that there should be no interference from the business side. However, our backer, clerking still [i.e., the rich backer worked as a clerk to dispel her boredom], was mortally terrified not only by the danger we found ourselves in, but by the word treason. She was of good old American stock, and besides, relatives of hers owned a great food industry. They pressed her hard. She came to me and said we would have to lay off the war, or there would be no more subsidy. There was no more subsidy ... But I wouldn't have missed that year for kingdom come."

Notable writers who contributed to the magazine under his guidance included Sherwood Anderson, Van Wyck Brooks, Max Eastman, Robert Frost, D. H. Lawrence, Vachel Lindsay, Amy Lowell, and Lala Lajpat Rai.
