= The Dial =

Artistic and political publication, 1840–1929

- Categories: Politics, literature
- Founded: 1840
- Final issue: 1929
- Country: United States
- Language: English

The Dial was an American magazine published intermittently from 1840 to 1929. In its first form, from 1840 to 1844, it served as the chief publication of the Transcendentalists. From the 1880s to 1919 it was revived as a political review and literary criticism magazine. From 1920 to 1929 it was an influential outlet for modernist literature in English. In January 2023, the name of The Dial was revived for a new online magazine of international writing and reporting.

== Transcendentalist journal ==
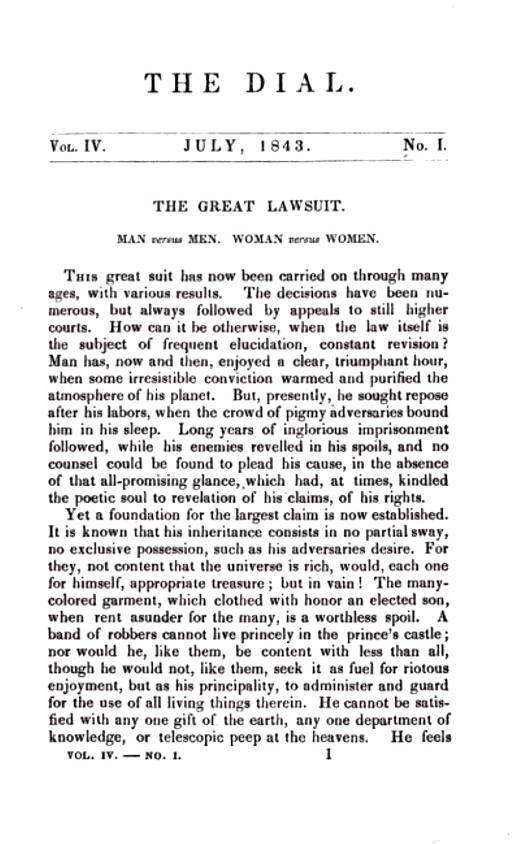
July 1843 issue of The Dial, featuring Margaret Fuller's "The Great Lawsuit"

Members of the Hedge Club began talks for creating a vehicle for their essays and reviews in philosophy and religion in October 1839. Other influential journals, including the North American Review and the Christian Examiner refused to accept their work for publication. Orestes Brownson proposed utilizing his recently established periodical Boston Quarterly Review but members of the club decided a new publication was a better solution. Frederick Henry Hedge, Theodore Parker, and Ralph Waldo Emerson were originally considered for the editor role. On October 20, 1839, Margaret Fuller officially accepted the editorship, though she was unable to begin work on the publication until the first week of 1840. George Ripley served as the managing editor. Its first issue was published in July 1840 with an introduction by Emerson calling it a "Journal in a new spirit". In this first form, the magazine remained in publication until 1844. Emerson wrote to Fuller on August 4, 1840, of his ambitions for the magazine:

I begin to wish to see a different Dial from that which I first imagined. I would not have it too purely literary. I wish we might make a Journal so broad & great in its survey that it should lead the opinion of this generation on every great interest & read the law on property, government, education, as well as on art, letters, & religion. A great Journal people must read. And it does not seem worth our while to work with any other than sovereign aims. So I wish we might court some of the good fanatics and publish chapters on every head in the whole Art of Living....I know the danger of such latitude of plan in any but the best conducted Journal. It becomes friendly to special modes of reform, partisan, bigoted, perhaps whimsical; not universal & poetic. But our round table is not, I fancy, in imminent peril of party & bigotry, & we shall bruise each the other's whims by the collision.

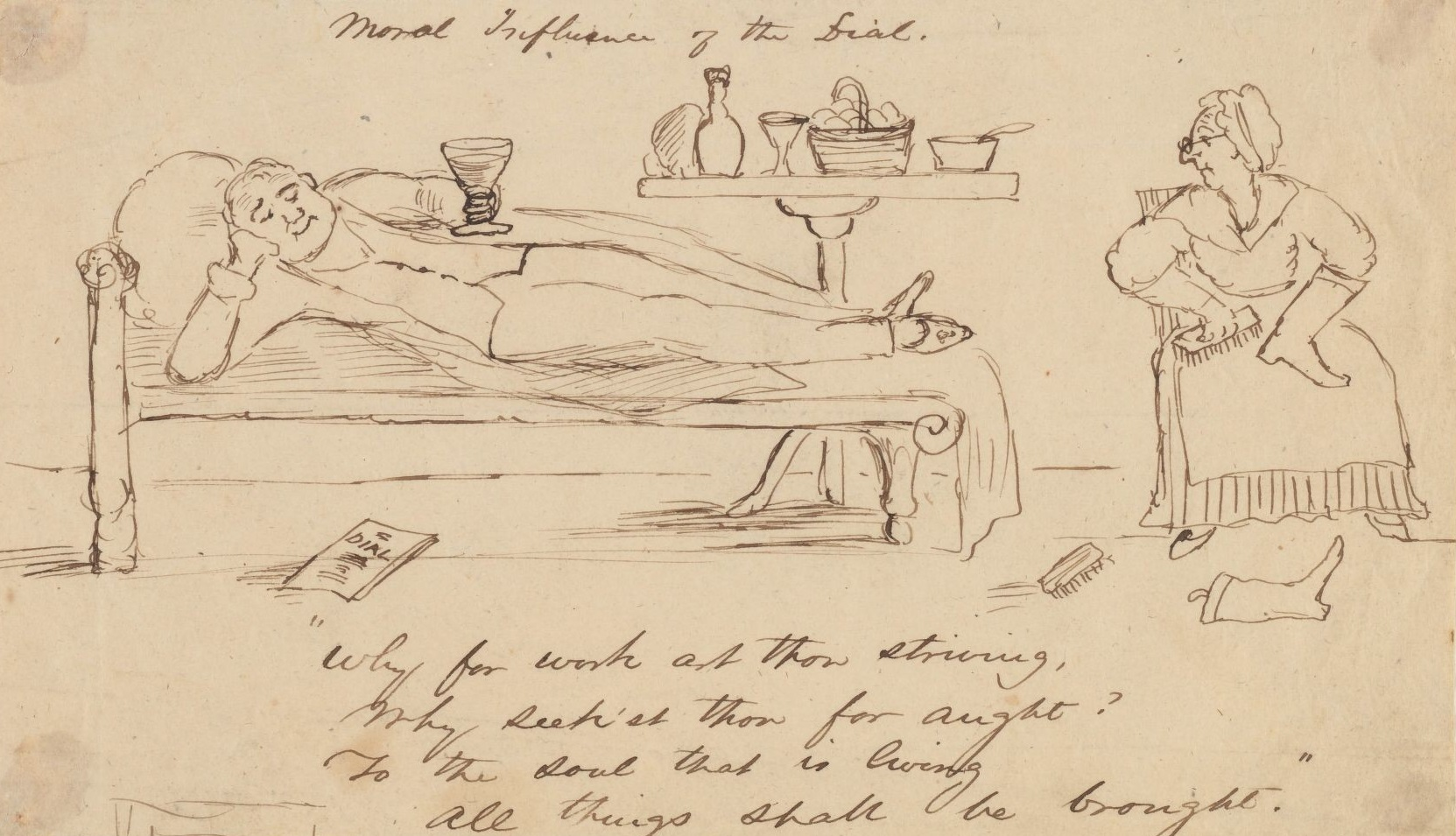
"The moral influence of The Dial", a caricature by Christopher Pearse Cranch, c. 1841–1844

The title of the journal, which was suggested by Amos Bronson Alcott, intended to evoke a sundial. The connotations of the image were expanded upon by Emerson in concluding his editorial introduction to the journal's first issue:

And so with diligent hands and good intent we set down our Dial on the earth. We wish it may resemble that instrument in its celebrated happiness, that of measuring no hours but those of sunshine. Let it be one cheerful rational voice amidst the din of mourners and polemics. Or to abide by our chosen image, let it be such a Dial, not as the dead face of a clock, hardly even such as the Gnomon in a garden, but rather such a Dial as is the Garden itself, in whose leaves and flowers the suddenly awakened sleeper is instantly apprised not what part of dead time, but what state of life and growth is now arrived and arriving.

The Dial was heavily criticized, even by Transcendentalists. Ripley said, "They had expected hoofs and horns while it proved as gentle as any sucking dove". The journal was never financially stable. In 1843, Elizabeth Peabody, acting as business manager, noted that the journal's income was not covering the cost of printing and that subscriptions totaled just over two hundred. Nevertheless, Peabody published in the journal herself. In 1844 a chapter of the Lotus Sūtra translated by her from French to English was published in The Dial; this chapter was the first English version of any Buddhist scripture.

The journal ceased publication in April 1844. Horace Greeley, in the May 25 issue of the New-York Weekly Tribune, reported it as an end to the "most original and thoughtful periodical ever published in this country".

=== Editorship of Margaret Fuller ===
Margaret Fuller (1810-1850) was the first editor for The Dial an American 19th-century writer, editor and an advocate for women. Born in Cambridge, Massachusetts, Fuller received an exceptional education from her father, Timothy Fuller who was a lawyer. Fuller’s education would later allow her to become a highly intellectual woman and contribute her major writing Woman in the Nineteenth Century and minor writings such as "Recollection of Mystical Experience." Fuller’s career is a blend of Transcendentalist philosophy and early feminism. Combining her rigorous educational training and her exposure to Transcendentalism, Fuller was able to convey her thoughts and ideals to the world through her contributions at The Dial and The New York Tribune. Fuller was an important figure among the Transcendentalists in the 19th century and her most significant role was her involvement in The Dial. The Dial is a literary and philosophical journal that served as an outlet for Transcendentalists to convey their thoughts and ideas.

Founded in 1840 by major Transcendentalist figures, Emerson and Ripley, they asked Fuller to join and she became the first full-time editor from 1840 to 1842. During this time, The Dial is noted as Fuller’s most significant professional role as she worked alongside with Emerson. During her time at The Dial, Fuller was known for including other transcendentalist's writings as a space to voice their thoughts and reactions through their own transcendentalism stages. She focused on individual thought, the self, and gender roles in society. Fuller was responsible for overseeing and approving the content published in the journal. She also included her own work, which focused on individual thought, the self, and gender roles in society. While there were some unexpected issues, Fuller’s contributions helped establish the platform for discussions of philosophy, literature, and social issues which convey the ideals found in Transcendentalism. While Fuller was inclusive of other’s writings most were hesitant to have their work published, which led to the magazine to struggle financially and low reader participation. Thus, she contributed her own writings which addressed topics such as education, culture and the role of women. During her time at The Dial she wrote and published “The Great Lawsuit: Man versus Men, Woman versus Women” in 1843. Two years later Fuller republished and expanded the essay into a book named Woman in the Nineteenth Century. In her book, Fuller delves deeper into the role of a woman and the rights that she possesses. She also discusses the limitations placed on obtaining an education, job security, and even personal advancement aside from men. Fuller also explored the idea that men and women are both capable of intellectual and spiritual abilities and that society should reflect this perspective.

Fuller’s most intellectual work becomes significant, when understood through her role at The Dial, where she helped cultivate and distribute Transcendentalist thought. During her time in Boston, Fuller hosted “Conversations” which brought women together to discuss philosophy and social issues, which further emphasized the mission of The Dial. Both outlets created a space for women to participate in intellectual thought and revealed Fuller’s goal of including women in educational forums and discussions, instead of remaining passive observers. While the “Conversations” were unable to reach every woman, The Dial served as a platform for expanding women’s voices and educational resources in a limited space.

Women in the Nineteenth Century, first appeared in The Dial in 1845 and served as a gateway to her ideas about gender equality. In her book Fuller emphasized specific Transcendentalism principles such as individualism and self-realization, which were also promoted in The Dial, while also encouraging ideas of social reform. While some readers considered her work to be dense and hard to read, the publication within The Dial allowed it to reach an audience familiar with progressive thought, amplifying its impact on the broader community. Even as Fuller later transitioned to journalism at The New York Tribune, gaining national recognition, the foundation and audience she acquired at The Dial remained central to her intellectual influence.

Fuller’s later writings, which included her spiritual writings and reports from Europe can also be traced back to her time and intellectual upbringing cultivated by The Dial. Her essay “Recollection of Mystical Experience,” emphasizes her personal account of spirituality and connection to nature, which reflects the same Transcendentalist ideals she helped promote as an editor. After her time at The Dial, Fuller expanded on international reports based on political, social, and cultural issues that the journal encouraged its contributors to explore. Fuller’s work, whether focused on feminism or political reform and spirituality, demonstrates how The Dial served as a starting point and central theme to her published work. Her contribution to the journal not only shaped its identity but also established her legacy as a key figure in American Transcendentalism and reform movements of the 19th century.

== Political review and literary criticism magazine ==
After a one-year revival in 1860, the third incarnation of The Dial, this time as a journal of both politics and literary criticism, began publication in 1880. This version of the magazine was founded by Francis Fisher Browne in Chicago. Browne claimed it to be a legitimate offspring of Emerson and Fuller's Dial. Browne would serve as its editor for over three decades. He envisioned his new literary journal in the genteel tradition of its predecessor, containing book reviews, articles about current trends in the sciences and humanities, and politics, as well as long lists of current book titles. It was in this form that Margaret Anderson, soon to be founder of The Little Review, worked for the magazine. Although Chicago was a city reputedly indifferent to literary pursuits, The Dial attained national prominence, absorbing The Chap-Book in 1898.

Francis Browne died in 1913 after elevating the magazine by its unswerving standard in design and content. Control of the magazine shifted to his siblings, and under their control, the magazine lost prominence because they lacked the editing and managing abilities of Francis. In 1916, rather than continuing the failing magazine, the Browne family sold The Dial to Martyn Johnson, who "set the magazine on a liberal, even increasingly radical course in politics and the arts as well as in literature." Although The Dial was, at the time, a reputable magazine with a noted Midwestern influence, Johnson decided to move to New York in 1918 to distance the magazine from the Midwest and reconnect with the city because many of the magazine's new editors had connections there. Johnson's Dial soon encountered financial problems, but future editor Scofield Thayer, heir to a New England wool fortune, invested in the magazine. During this time, Thayer met Randolph Bourne, a contributing editor to The Dial. Bourne's steadfast pacifism and aesthetic views of art inspired Thayer, who shared Bourne's outlooks.

After contributing to $30,000 to The Dial in 1918 and 1919, Thayer hoped for some editorial control of the magazine. Johnson, however, would not yield any responsibilities. In addition, Johnson "began openly to agree with John Dewey's support of President Wilson's war policy and to oppose Randolph Bourne's pacifism", and "the chief backer of the Dial [Thayer] resigned, wallet and all", in December 1918. These internal conflicts over ideology and finances caused Johnson to put the magazine up for sale in 1919. Thayer teamed with a friend from Harvard, James Sibley Watson Jr., to buy The Dial late in 1919. Watson, being an heir to the Western Union fortune, had ample money to buy the magazine with Thayer.

Thorstein Veblen and others who shared his thinking were important presences on The Dial staff and in its pages during its first few years in New York. Veblen's 1921 book, The Engineers and the Price System, comprises essays published in The Dial in 1919.

From 1913 to 1920, no work by D. H. Lawrence appeared in The Dial, "and the magazine printed only five reviews of his work", even though "[i]n some respects, the years 1913-20 were Lawrence's most brillantly productive period of creative work". In the 1920s, however, Lawrence's writings frequently appeared in The Dial.

== Modernist literary magazine ==
In 1920, Scofield Thayer and Dr. James Sibley Watson Jr. re-established The Dial as a literary magazine, the form for which it was most successful and best known. The magazine also contained an avant-garde character. Under Watson's and Thayer's sway The Dial published remarkably influential artwork, poetry and fiction, including William Butler Yeats' "The Second Coming" and the first United States publication of T. S. Eliot's The Waste Land. The Waste Land, however, barely made it to the pages of The Dial. Ezra Pound, the magazine's foreign advisor/editor (1920–1923), suggested the poem for publication. Thayer, having never seen the work, approved it for the magazine based on this suggestion and because Eliot had been Thayer's classmate at Oxford. Eliot became frustrated, however, at the small amount The Dial intended to pay for the poem. Thayer was relieved that Eliot was about to pull the deal off the table because he was weary of Eliot's style. Negotiations continued, however, until The Dial paid Eliot $2,130 for the poem, by also awarding the magazine's second annual prize, which carried an award of $2,000 (£450). This was a substantial amount, approximately equal to Eliot's 1922 salary at Lloyds Bank (£500, $2,215), and worth about $90,000 in 2006 dollars.

The first year of the Watson/Thayer Dial alone saw the appearance of Sherwood Anderson, Djuna Barnes, Kenneth Burke, William Carlos Williams, Hart Crane, E. E. Cummings, Charles Demuth, Kahlil Gibran, Gaston Lachaise, Amy Lowell, Marianne Moore, Ezra Pound, Arthur Wilson later known as Winslow Wilson, Odilon Redon, Bertrand Russell, Carl Sandburg, Van Wyck Brooks, and W. B. Yeats.

The Dial published art as well as poetry and essays, with artists ranging from Vincent van Gogh, Renoir, Henri Matisse, and Odilon Redon, through Oskar Kokoschka, Constantin Brâncuși, and Edvard Munch, and Georgia O'Keeffe and Joseph Stella. The magazine also reported on the cultural life of European capitals, writers included T. S. Eliot from London, John Eglinton initially from Dublin, but after 1922 reporting on Dublin from a self-imposed exile in England, Ezra Pound from Paris, Thomas Mann from Germany, and Hugo von Hofmannsthal from Vienna.

Scofield Thayer was the magazine's editor-in-chief from 1920 to 1926, and Watson was publisher and president from 1920 until its end in 1929. Several managing editors worked for The Dial during the twenties: Gilbert Seldes (1922–23), Kenneth Burke (1923), Alyse Gregory (1923–25). Due to Thayer's nervous breakdown, he left The Dial in 1925 and formally resigned in 1926. Marianne Moore, a contributor to The Dial and advisor, became managing editor in 1925. She became the magazine's editor-in-chief upon Thayer's resignation.

Ernest Hemingway published his poem The Soul of Spain With McAlmon and Bird the Publishers in the German magazine Der Querschnitt where he directly attacked The Dial in 1924. Der Querschnitt was seen as a German counterpart of The Dial by some.

Scofield Thayer's mental health continued to deteriorate, and he was hospitalized in 1927. Around this time, Watson began to delve into avant garde films, leaving Moore to her own auspices as editor-in-chief. Toward the end of the magazine's run, the staff felt that they were staying on because of an obligation to continue rather than a drive to be a strong, modern magazine. When the magazine ended in 1929, the staff was confident that the precedent they set would be carried on by other magazines.

In 1981, the Worcester Art Museum in Worcester, Massachusetts, held an exhibition titled "The Dial: Arts and Letters in the 1920s" and published a catalog titled The Dial: Arts and Letters in the 1920s: An anthology of writings from The Dial, 1920-29, Edited by Gaye L. Brown. ISBN 0-87023-407-2

=== The Dial Award ===
In June 1921, Thayer and Watson announced the creation of the Dial Award, $2000 to be presented to one of its contributors, acknowledging their "service to letters" in hopes of providing the artist with "leisure through which at least one artist may serve God (or go to the Devil) according to his own lights." The first of these awards was granted in January 1922 to Sherwood Anderson for work he had published in the magazine in 1921. Eight Dial Awards were given in all.

- 1921: Sherwood Anderson
- 1922: T. S. Eliot
- 1923: Van Wyck Brooks
- 1924: Marianne Moore
- 1925: E. E. Cummings
- 1926: William Carlos Williams
- 1927: Ezra Pound
- 1928: Kenneth Burke

=== Notable contributors by volume ===
In its literary phase, The Dial was published monthly. Notable contributors for each of its volumes (six-month intervals) are summarized below.

- Vol. 68 (January–June 1920) Sherwood Anderson, Djuna Barnes, Randolph Bourne, Kenneth Burke, Malcolm Cowley, Hart Crane, E. E. Cummings, Charles Demuth, Kahlil Gibran, Gaston Lachaise, Amy Lowell, Edna St. Vincent Millay, Marianne Moore, Ezra Pound, Odilon Redon, Paul Rosenfeld, Bertrand Russell, Carl Sandburg, Gilbert Seldes (Sganarelle), Van Wyck Brooks, W. B. Yeats
- Vol. 69 (July–December 1920) Richard Aldington, Julien Benda, Kenneth Burke, Joseph Conrad, Stewart Davis, T. S. Eliot, Ford Madox Ford, Waldo Frank, Paul Gauguin, Remy de Gourmont, James Joyce, Henry McBride, Ezra Pound, Marcel Proust, Arthur Rimbaud, Vincent van Gogh, William Carlos Williams, William Butler Yeats
- Vol. 70 (January–June 1921) Richard Aldington, Sherwood Anderson, Johan Bojer, Jean Cocteau, E. E. Cummings, John Dos Passos, T. S. Eliot, Kahlil Gibran, Remy de Gourmont, Ford Maddox Ford, Gaston Lachaise, D. H. Lawrence, Wyndham Lewis, Vachel Lindsay, Mina Loy, Thomas Mann, Henry McBride, George Moore, Marianne Moore, Edwin Arlington Robinson, Paul Rosenfeld, Gilbert Seldes, Arthur Wilson later known as Winslow Wilson
- Vol. 71 (July–December 1921) Sherwood Anderson, Padraic Colum, Arthur Dove, Anatole France, D. H. Lawrence, Wyndham Lewis, Amy Lowell, Marianne Moore, J. Middleton Murry, Pablo Picasso, Ezra Pound, Logan Pearsall Smith, Arthur Schnitzler, Max Weber, William Butler Yeats
- Vol. 72 (January–June 1922) Conrad Aiken, Sherwood Anderson, Louis Aragon, Alexander Archipenko, Maxwell Bodenheim, Ivan Bunin, Kenneth Burke, Ananda Coomaraswamy, Hart Crane, Thomas Jewell Craven, S. Foster Damon, E. E. Cummings, Alfeo Faggi, Hermann Hesse, A. L. Kroeber, D. H. Lawrence, Henri Matisse, Henry McBride, Raymond Mortimer, Paul Rosenfeld, Henri Rousseau, Bertrand Russell, Carl Sandburg, George Santayana, Gilbert Seldes, May Sinclair, Felix Timmermans, Paul Valéry
- Vol. 73 (July–December 1922) Sherwood Anderson, Constantin Brâncuși, Marc Chagall, John Dos Passos, John Eglinton, T. S. Eliot, Elie Faure, Duncan Grant, Hermann Hesse, Hugo von Hofmannsthal, D. H. Lawrence, Mina Loy, Franz Marc, Henri Matisse, Thomas Mann, Raymond Mortimer, Paul Rosenfeld, Arthur Schnitzler, Wallace Stevens, Edmund Wilson, William Butler Yeats
- Vol. 74 (January–June 1923) Conrad Aiken, Sherwood Anderson, Malcolm Cowley, E. E. Cummings, Stuart Davis, John Dewey, Gerhart Hauptmann, Hugo von Hofmannsthal, Marie Laurencin, D. H. Lawrence, Thomas Mann, Katherine Mansfield, Frans Masereel, Henry McBride, George Moore, Marianne Moore, Raymond Mortimer, Pablo Picasso, Ezra Pound, Paul Rosenfeld, Henri Rousseau, Edmund Wilson, William Butler Yeats, Stefan Zweig
- Vol. 75 (July–December 1923) Djuna Barnes, Pierre Bonnard, Van Wyck Brooks, Karel Čapek, Adolphe Dehn, André Derain, Roger Fry, Alyse Gregory, Knut Hamsun, Manuel Komroff, Alfred Kreymborg, Julius Meier-Graefe, Marie Laurencin, George Moore, Paul Morand, Luigi Pirandello, Bertrand Russell, Edward Sapir, Georges Seurat, Jean Toomer, William Carlos Williams, Edmund Wilson, Virginia Woolf
- Vol. 76 (January–June 1924) Marc Chagall, Padraic Colum, E. E. Cummings, Jacob Epstein, Élie Faure, E. M. Forster, Maxim Gorky, Gaston Lachaise, Marie Laurencin, Aristide Maillol, Heinrich Mann, Thomas Mann, John Marin, H. L. Mencken, Edvard Munch, J. Middleton Murry, Pablo Picasso, Raffaello Piccolli, Herbert Read, Edwin Arlington Robinson, Herbert J. Seligmann, Miguel de Unamuno, Maurice de Vlaminck, Stefan Zweig
- Vol. 77 (July–December 1924) Ernst Barlach, Clive Bell, Marc Chagall, Thomas Craven, Adolphe Dehn, André Derain, José Ortega y Gasset, Maxim Gorky, Duncan Grant, Marianne Moore, Edwin Muir, Jules Romains, Bertrand Russell, Carl Sandburg, Herbert J. Seligmann, Georges Seurat, Logan Pearsall Smith, Oswald Spengler, Leo Stein, Wallace Stevens, Scofield Thayer, Edmund Wilson, Virginia Woolf
- Vol. 78 (January–June 1925) Sherwood Anderson, Clive Bell, T. S. Eliot, Hugo von Hofmannsthal, Henri Matisse, Henry McBride, Marianne Moore, Paul Morand, Raymond Mortimer, Lewis Mumford, Edvard Munch, Georgia O'Keeffe, Auguste Rodin, Paul Rosenfeld, George Santayana, Oswald Spengler, William Carlos Williams, Virginia Woolf
- Vol. 79 (July–December 1925) Thomas Hart Benton, Pierre Bonnard, Kenneth Burke, Joseph Campbell, Thomas Craven, Malcolm Cowley, E. E. Cummings, Charles Demuth, Dostoevsky, Arthur Dove, Élie Faure, Waldo Frank, Roger Fry, Eduard von Keyserling, Marie Laurencin, D. H. Lawrence, Mabel Dodge Luhan, Thomas Mann, Henry McBride, Marianne Moore, Georgia O'Keeffe, Logan Pearsall Smith, Arthur Schnitzler, Édouard Vuillard
- Vol. 80 (January–June 1926) Alexander Archipenko, Hart Crane, E. E. Cummings, Adolf Dehn, Alfeo Faggi, Anatole France, Waldo Frank, Robert Hillyer, Augustus John, Nikolai Leskov, Aristide Maillol, Henry McBride, Pablo Picasso, Rainer Maria Rilke, Paul Rosenfeld, Henri Rousseau, George Saintsbury, Gilbert Seldes, Scofield Thayer, Paul Valéry, Yvor Winters
- Vol. 81 (July–December 1926) Paul Cézanne, Hart Crane, Thomas Craven, John Eglinton, Roger Fry, Marie Laurencin, D. H. Lawrence, Thomas Mann, Henri Matisse, Paul Morand, Pablo Picasso, Raffaello Piccolli, Auguste Renoir, I. A. Richards, Bertrand Russell, George Saintsbury, Herman George Scheffauer, Gilbert Seldes, Gertrude Stein, William Carlos Williams, William Butler Yeats
- Vol. 82 (January–June 1927) Conrad Aiken, Constantin Brâncuși, Paul Cézanne, Hart Crane, Benedetto Croce, T. S. Eliot, Ramon Fernandez, Leon Srabian Herald, Winslow Homer, Oskar Kokoschka, Thomas Mann, Henry McBride, Edvard Munch, Paul Rosenfeld, George Saintsbury, George Santayana, Meridel Le Sueur, Sacheverell Sitwell, Vincent van Gogh, William Carlos Williams, Jack Yeats
- Vol. 83 (July–December 1927) Conrad Aiken, Paul Cézanne, Malcolm Cowley, Hart Crane, E. E. Cummings, André Derain, Marie Laurencin, D. H. Lawrence, Raymond Mortimer, Pablo Picasso, Bertrand Russell, Leo Stein, Charles Trueblood, Paul Valéry, Vincent van Gogh, William Butler Yeats
- Vol. 84 (January–June 1928) Conrad Aiken, Kenneth Burke, Kwei Chen, Padraic Colum, T. S. Eliot, Robert Hillyer, Wyndham Lewis, Henry McBride, Pablo Picasso, Ezra Pound, Llewelyn Powys, Odilon Redon, William Carlos Williams, William Butler Yeats
- Vol. 85 (July–December 1928) Conrad Aiken, Kenneth Burke, Kwei Chen, Paul Claudel, Padraic Colum, T. S. Eliot, Waldo Frank, Maxim Gorki, Philip Littell, Aristide Maillol, Frans Masereel, Elie Nadelman, Pablo Picasso, Ezra Pound, Logan Pearsall Smith, Joseph Stella, Jean Toomer, Charles K. Trueblood, Max Weber, William Carlos Williams, Louis Zukofsky
- Vol. 86 (January–July 1929) Conrad Aiken, Kenneth Burke, Hart Crane, Padraic Colum, Maxim Gorki, Duncan Grant, Stanley Kunitz, D. H. Lawrence, Aristide Maillol, Pablo Picasso, Ezra Pound, John Cowper Powys, Llewelyn Powys, Bertrand Russell, William Carlos Williams, Paul Valéry, Felix Albrecht Harta
