= Amanda America Dickson =

American slave and socialite (1849–1893)

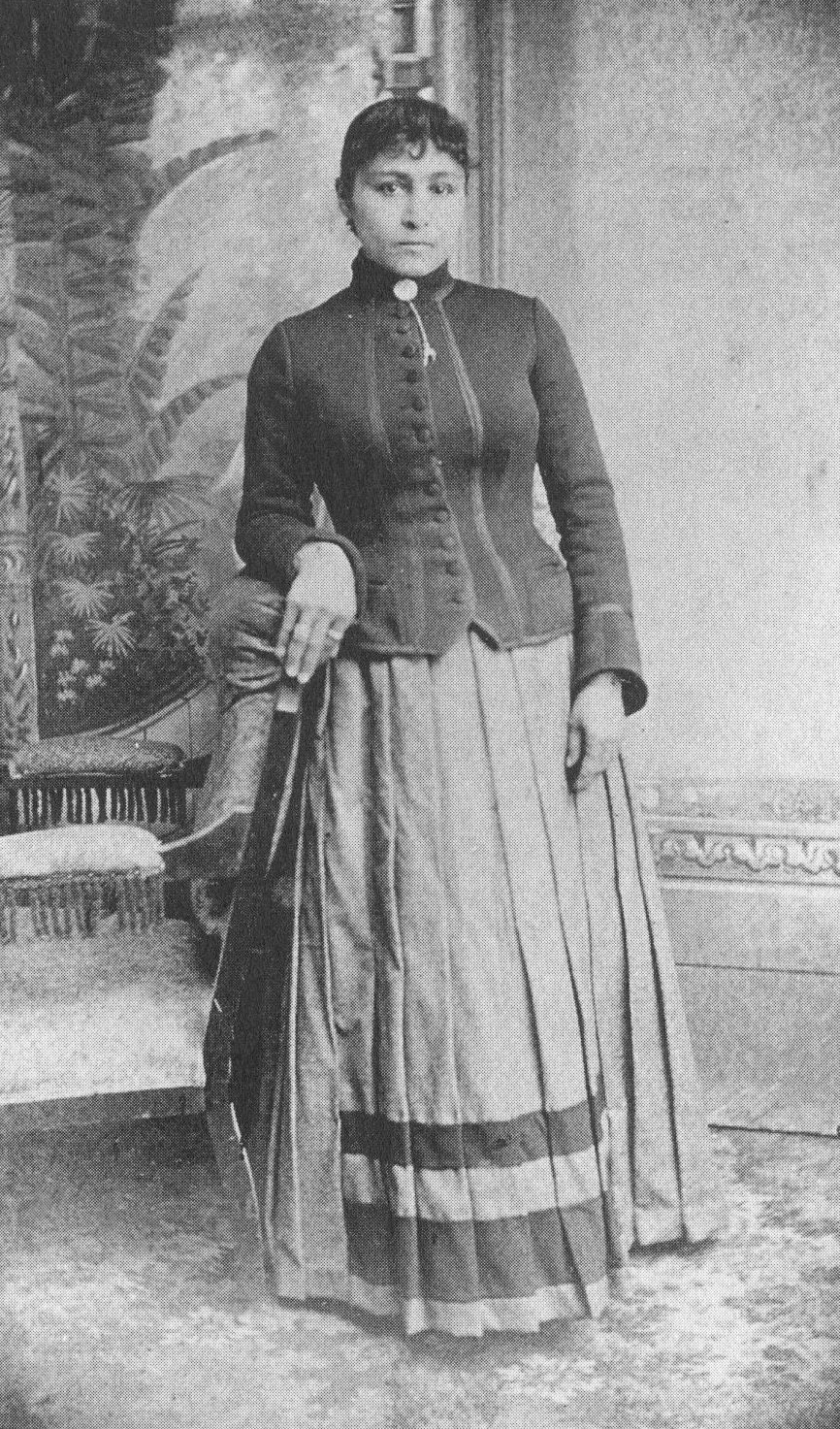
- Born: November 20, 1849; Hancock County, Georgia, US
- Died: June 11, 1893 (aged 43)
- Education: Atlanta University
- Spouses: Charles Eubanks; Nathan Toomer (m. 1892; died 1893)
- Children: 2
- Parents: David Dickson (father); Julia Frances Lewis Dickson (mother)

Amanda America Dickson (November 20, 1849 – June 11, 1893) was an African-American socialite in Georgia who became known as one of the wealthiest African-American women of the 19th century after inheriting a large estate from her white planter father.

Born into slavery, she was the child of David Dickson, a white planter, and Julia Frances Lewis (Dickson), a girl he enslaved, who was thirteen when Amanda was born. Amanda was raised by Elizabeth Sholars Dickson, her white grandmother and legal mistress (owner). She was educated and schooled in the social skills of her father's class, and he helped her to enjoy a life of relative privilege away from the harsh realities of slavery before emancipation following the American Civil War. In her late 20s, Dickson attended the normal school of Atlanta University, a historically black college, from 1876 to 1878.

After her father's death in 1885, Amanda Dickson inherited his estate. His white relatives challenged the will but Dickson ultimately won a successful ruling in the case. His estate included 17,000 acres of land in Hancock and Washington counties in Georgia. She married twice: Her first husband was white, while her second husband was wealthy, educated, and mixed-race.

== Early life and education ==
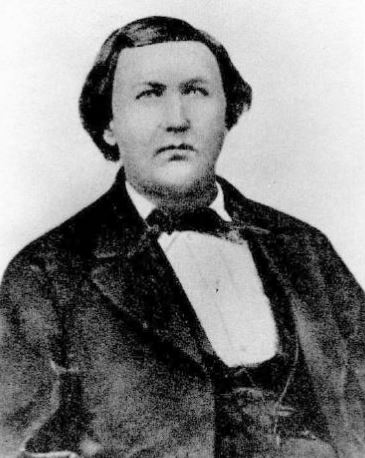
David Dickson

Amanda America Dickson was born into slavery in Hancock County, Georgia. Her enslaved mother, Julia Frances Lewis Dickson, was just 13 when she was born. Amanda’s father, David Dickson (1809–1885), was a white planter and slave plantation owner who owned her mother; he was one of the eight wealthiest plantation owners in the county. When he was 40 years old, David Dickson raped 12-year-old Julia Dickson, and she became pregnant. After Amanda was weaned, she was taken from her enslaved mother and maternal grandmother, Rose, to be raised in the household of her owner, her white paternal grandmother Elizabeth Sholars Dickson. As Amanda grew, her grandmother used her as a domestic servant.

Throughout Amanda's childhood, her father became wealthier and more famous, renowned for his innovative and successful farming techniques. By 1861, he was known as the "Prince of Georgia Farmers," having contributed perhaps more than any other farmer in Georgia at that time to the financial prosperity of the region.

Amanda's father showered her with love and affection. Dickson's social status may have enabled the child to live a life of relative privilege while enslaved. Evidence suggests that David Dickson took charge of Amanda's education. In her white grandmother's household, she learned to read, write, and play the piano, unlike what was permitted her enslaved relatives. Amanda also learned rules of social etiquette appropriate for the social standing of her father's family. She learned to dress in a modest, elegant fashion and how to present herself as a "lady". Amanda also learned from her father how to conduct business transactions responsibly and how to maintain and protect her finances after marriage.

In 1864, Amanda's grandmother Elizabeth Sholars Dickson died. Amanda and her grandmother Elizabeth had shared a particularly close relationship, with Amanda spending much time in her grandmother's room. Amanda was legally held as Elizabeth's slave until her death. Beginning in 1801, Georgia had prohibited slaveholders from independently freeing their slaves, requiring an act of legislature (seldom given), for each request. Therefore, Elizabeth and David Dickson had no means to manumit Amanda and keep her with them in Georgia until the Thirteenth Amendment to the U.S. Constitution, which abolished slavery and involuntary servitude, was ratified on December 6, 1865.

At the age of 27, Amanda chose to leave her father's plantation in Hancock County, Georgia to attend the normal school of Atlanta University, where she studied teaching from 1876 to 1878.

== Marriages ==
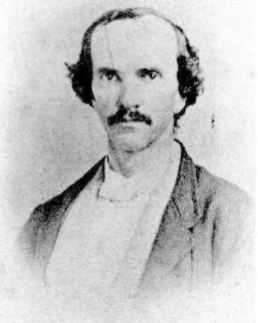
Charles Eubanks

In 1866, at the age of sixteen, Amanda America moved to a small plantation in Floyd County, Georgia near the city of Rome. She married (or lived with as if she were married to) Charles Eubanks, a white first-cousin and Civil War veteran. Because of laws against inter-racial marriage in Georgia at the time, Amanda America and Charles, as an interracial couple, could not legally marry in Georgia. Therefore, they either never officially married, or they married out of state before returning to Georgia (but there is no surviving proof of a legal marriage.)

They had two sons: Julian Henry (1866–1937) and Charles Green Eubanks (1870–c. 1900). Their mixed-race sons later married prominent members of Georgia society. Julian Henry Eubanks married Eva Walton, the granddaughter of George Walton, who signed the American Declaration of Independence. Charles Green Eubanks married Kate Holsey, the daughter of Lucius Holsey, a bishop in the Colored Methodist Episcopal Church, and his wife Harriet. After four years of being married to (or living as a married couple with) Charles Eubanks, Amanda left her husband and returned to her father's plantation in 1870, shortly after giving birth to her second son, Charles Green. Charles Eubanks died a few years later on July 31, 1873. David Dickson's wife, Clara Harris Dickson, died the next day.

Years after having completed her teaching degree, Amanda America married a second time, on July 14, 1892. Her second husband was Nathan Toomer from Perry, Georgia, and she legally was known as Amanda America Dickson Toomer. Nathan Toomer was a wealthy, educated African-American man of her class. He was the child of an enslaved black woman, Kit, and was ultimately bought by wealthy white John Toomer, who had settled in Houston County, Georgia in the 1850s. As a young man, Nathan had served as the personal assistant to then-owner Colonel Henry Toomer, and in that capacity learned the ways of white upper-class gentlemen. Amanda died on June 11, 1893, eleven months after they were married.

== David Dickson's will ==
When David Dickson died suddenly on February 18, 1885, Amanda America Dickson inherited the majority of his vast estate, which included 17,000 acres of land. His will left his estate to her "sound judgment and unlimited discretion" and prohibited interference from anyone, including any husband that she may have. In what became known as the David Dickson Will Case, 79 white relatives of David Dickson disputed the will in court, mainly arguing that David Dickson was not of a sound mind when he wrote the will, that he was "unduly influenced" by Amanda America and Julia Dickson, and that Amanda America was not his child.

On July 6, 1885, probate judge R. H. Lewis ruled in favor of the will. In November 1885, the trial in the Superior Court of Hancock County began, with the eventual ruling siding with Amanda America Dickson and her two sons. Then, in March 1886, the white relatives filed their appeal with the Supreme Court of Georgia. On October 11, 1886, chief justice James Jackson, and associate justices Samuel Hall and Mark Blanford heard the case following the appeal. James Jackson expressed his firm conviction against upholding the will, saying, "I would rather die in my place than uphold the will." A few days later, he became ill with pneumonia and died.

Judge Logan E. Bleckley filled his vacancy and refused to hear the case again. Associate justices Samuel Hall and Mark Blanford remained to deliver the ruling regarding whether the white relatives would receive a new trial. Ultimately, eight months later, on June 13, 1887, Samuel Hall and Mark Blanford of the Georgia Supreme Court also ruled in favor of Amanda America and her two sons, formally settling the dispute of David Dickson's will. Citing the Fourteenth Amendment to the U.S. Constitution, the Georgia Supreme Court affirmed the lower court's decision, saying that the rights and privileges of a black woman and her children would be the same rights and privileges of a white concubine or an illegitimate white woman and her children. So, the same laws governed the rights and privileges of women of both races.

== Life in Augusta, Georgia ==
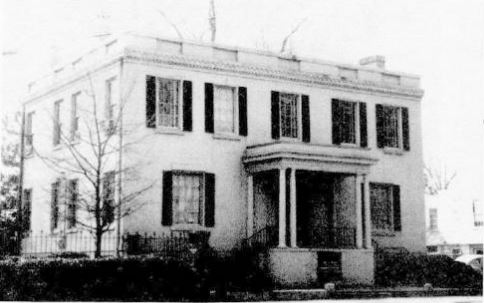
Amanda America's house in Augusta

The death of Amanda American Dickson's father, David Dickson, on February 18, 1885, marked a significant turning point in her life. Following his death, Amanda took immediate legal steps to secure her position and inheritance. To further protect herself and distance from her disgruntled white relatives-many of whom had been left out of David Dickson's will-Amanda relocated to Augusta, Georgia, a city she was already familiar with.

In 1886, she settled in Augusta and purchased an impressive seven-bedroom home at 452 Telfair Street, located in a diverse, multiracial neighborhood. During this era, white Georgians often viewed Black citizens through the rigid lens of the racial caste system, with little regard for wealth or class. However individuals like Amanda, the children of wealthy white planters-especially those with lighter skin-were sometimes more accepted by white society.

Despite these challenges, Amanda became an integral part of Augusta's elite black community, where she was admired for her considerable wealth, refined elegance, and keen intelligence. Those that knew her held her in the highest regard, recognizing her as a symbol of grace and resilience in a deeply divided society.

== Family ordeal ==
Amanda America Dickson spent the last eleven months of her life married to Nathan Toomer, a native of Perry, Georgia. The couple wed on July 14, 1892. Amanda's health was fragile throughout her second marriage, requiring constant medical attention from their family physician, Dr. Thomas D. Coleman.

By 1893, Amanda's condition had shown significant improvement, but a disturbing family incident caused her health to decline again, ultimately leading to her death. The incident involved her younger son, 23-year-old Charles Dickson, who was married to Kate Holsey. Charles became infatuated with his stepsister, 14-year-old Mamie Toomer. To protect Mamie from Charles' inappropriate attentions, Nathan and Amanda took her to the St. Francis School and Convent in Baltimore, Maryland, which was run by an order of black nuns.

However, Charles Dickson conspired with several accomplices, including his brother-in-law Dunbar Walton, his sister-in-law Carrie Walton Wilson, and a hired man, Louis E. Frank, to kidnap Mamie Toomer. Their plan was thwarted, and Walton, Frank, and their lawyer, E. J. Waring, were indicted by a Baltimore grand jury on charges of conspiracy to kidnap. Despite his involvement, Charles Dickson faced no legal consequences for his actions.

The stress and anxiety stemming from this incident, combined with Amanda's preexisting health conditions, caused her health to deteriorate further, leading to her untimely passing later that year.

== Death ==
In June 1893, following the resolution of the kidnapping incident involving Mamie Toomer, Charles Dickson, and his co-conspirators. Nathan and Amanda America purchased first-class tickets from a representative of the Pullman Palace Car Company for their journey from Baltimore, Maryland, back to Augusta, Georgia. However, due to racial discrimination, they were denied their first-class accommodations and the opportunity for direct, unimpeded travel to Augusta. The delays and conditions of the Pullman car, particularly the rising temperatures, became intolerable for Amanda America, causing her health to rapidly decline.

On the morning of June 9, 1893, Dr. F. D. Kendall, examined Amanda. While he noted that her heart and lungs appeared healthy, she was visibly nervous and eager to return home. He administered her anodyne, a medication to relieve pain. That afternoon, Nathan and a gravely ill Amanda America finally arrived at their home in Augusta, Georgia between four and five o'clock.

Dr. Eugene Foster attended to her in the absence of their family physician, Thomas D. Coleman. She was diagnosed with neurasthenia, also known as Beard's disease, a condition characterized as a general exhaustion of the nervous system. Symptoms of neurasthenia included severe headache, insomnia, digestive disturbances, and nervous exhaustion. " Amanda America Dickson Toomer passed away on June 11, 1893. The official cause of death listed on her certificate was "complications of diseases."

Her funeral was held at the Trinity Colored Methodist Episcopal Church in Augusta, Georgia. Amanda died without leaving a will, which led to a legal dispute over her estate. Both her mother, Julia Frances Lewis Dickson, and her second husband, Nathan Toomer, petitioned the court to be named temporary administrator. Eventually, an agreement was reached outside of court between Julia Dickson, Nathan Toomer, and Amanda's younger son, Charles Dickson.

Nine months after Amanda's death, Nathan Toomer married Nina Pinchback, the daughter of P. B. S. Pinchback, a notable Reconstruction Era senator-elect from Louisiana. On December 26, 1894, Nathan and Nina welcomed a son, Jean Toomer, who would later gain fame as a Harlem Renaissance writer, best known for his modernist novel Cane (1923).

== Representation in popular culture ==
A House Divided (2000) is the television movie that depicts the life of Amanda America Dickson. It stars Jennifer Beals as Dickson, Sam Waterston as David Dickson, LisaGay Hamilton as Julia Frances Lewis Dickson, and Shirley Douglas as Elizabeth Sholars Dickson.
