= Forgotten Prophet =

1984 biography of Randolph Bourne

- First edition
- Author: Bruce Clayton
- Subject: Biography
- Published: 1984 (Louisiana State University Press)
- Pages: 275
- ISBN: 9780807111697

Forgotten Prophet: The Life of Randolph Bourne is a book-length biography of American writer Randolph Bourne written by Bruce Clayton and published by Louisiana State University Press.
