= Twilight of the Idols (disambiguation) =

Twilight of the Idols is an 1889 book by Friedrich Nietzsche. It may also refer to:

- "Twilight of Idols" (essay), 1917 essay by Randolph Bourne
- Twilight of Idols (Fashion album), 1984 album by new wave band Fashion
- Twilight of the Idols (Gorgoroth album), 2003 album by black metal band Gorgoroth
- Twilight of the Idols (Slough Feg album), 1999 album by heavy metal band Slough Feg

== See also ==
- Twilight of the Gods (disambiguation)
