= The Olympian (novel) =

1912 novel by James Oppenheim

The Olympian: A Story of the City
- First edition
- Author: James Oppenheim
- Language: English
- Genre: Novel
- Publisher: Harper and Brothers
- Publication date: 1912
- Publication place: United States
- Media type: Print (hardback)
- Pages: 417
- OCLC: 3715121

The Olympian: A Story of the City is a novel by the American writer James Oppenheim (1882–1932) set in turn-of-the-century Pittsburgh, Pennsylvania.

It tells the Horatio Alger story of Kirby Trask, who rises from the working-class to become a steel magnate.
