= Waldo Frank =

American novelist, historian, political activist and literary critic (1889–1967)

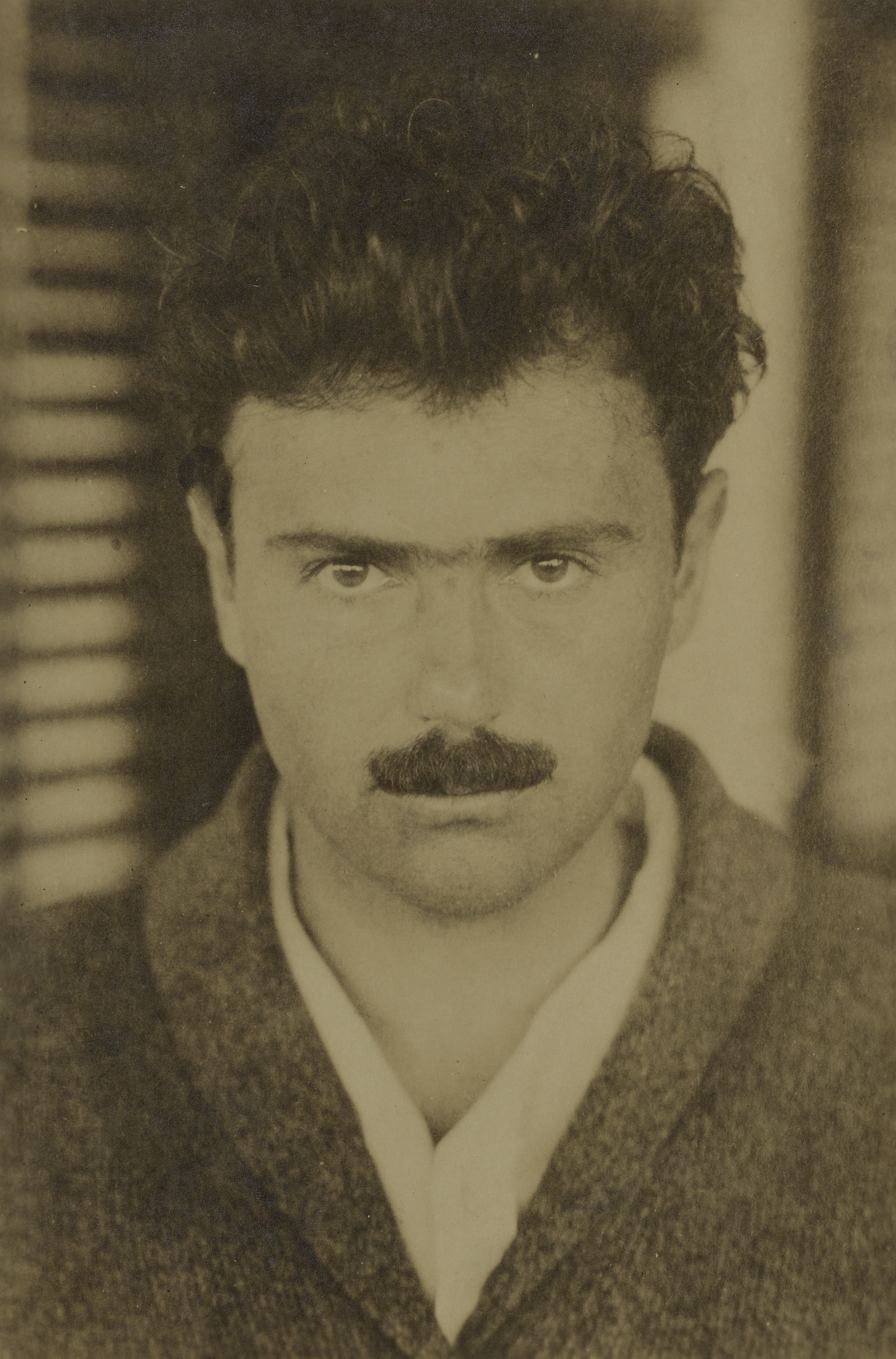
- Waldo Frank by Alfred Stieglitz, c. 1920
- Born: August 25, 1889; Long Branch, New Jersey, USA
- Died: January 9, 1967 (aged 77); White Plains, New York, USA
- Occupation: Novelist

Waldo David Frank (August 25, 1889 – January 9, 1967) was an American novelist, historian, political activist, and literary critic, who wrote extensively for The New Yorker and The New Republic during the 1920s and 1930s. Frank is best known for his studies of Spanish and Latin American literature and culture and his work is regarded as an intellectual bridge between the two continents.

A radical political activist during the years of the Great Depression, Frank delivered a keynote speech to the first congress of the League of American Writers and was the first chair of that organization. Frank broke with the Communist Party, USA in 1937 over its treatment of exiled Soviet leader Leon Trotsky, whom Frank met in Mexico in January of that year.

== Biography ==
=== Early years ===
Waldo Frank was born in Long Branch, New Jersey, on August 25, 1889, during his family's summer vacation. He was the youngest of four children to Julius J. Frank, a prosperous Wall Street attorney employed by the Hamburg-Amerika Line, and his wife, the former Helene Rosenberg, who hailed from the American South and was the daughter of a Confederate blockade runner during the American Civil War.

The young Frank grew up on the Upper West Side of New York City, where he attended DeWitt Clinton High School. He was expelled from school for refusing to take a Shakespeare course, saying that he knew more than the teacher and subsequently spent a year attending a college preparatory boarding school in Lausanne, Switzerland. Upon his return to the United States, Frank enrolled at Yale University, first earning a bachelor's degree before completing his Master's degree in 1911.

Following graduation, Frank worked briefly as a reporter for the New York Times before leaving in 1913 for Paris, where he went to read and write. With World War I in the wings, Frank returned to New York City in 1914.

In January 1917, Frank married Margaret Naumburg, a postgraduate pupil of John Dewey.

=== Literary career ===
Frank's first published novel, The Unwelcome Man (1917), was a psychoanalytic look into a man contemplating suicide. The novel also drew upon the ideas of New England transcendentalist Ralph Waldo Emerson and the poet Walt Whitman.

In 1916, Frank became associate editor of The Seven Arts, a journal that ran for just twelve issues but nonetheless became an important artistic and political influence. Its contributors were determined pacifists, a position that caused a decline in subscriptions and supporting funds. Contributors included Randolph Bourne, Van Wyck Brooks, and James Oppenheim, the founder and general editor of the magazine.

In 1921 Frank met and became intense friends with the young writer Jean Toomer. He served as editor for Toomer's first novel, Cane (1923), a modernist work combining poems and associated stories, inspired by his working in the rural South as a school principal at a black school. Toomer became an important figure in the Harlem Renaissance; of mixed-race and majority-white, complex ethnicity, he resisted being classified as a black writer and said he was "an American". They had a falling out and their friendship ended after 1923, due in part to an affair between Toomer and Naumburg.

Frank became a regular contributor to the New Yorker in 1925 under the pseudonym "Search-Light".

=== Political activity ===
Frank was an anti-militarist and declared himself a conscientious objector in registering for the draft in 1917. He became increasingly political during the 1920s, joining the liberal magazine The New Republic as a contributing editor in November 1925.

In 1929 together with fellow writers Sherwood Anderson, Theodore Dreiser, and others Frank worked to raise money for striking workers in Southern textile mills. He toured the Soviet Union in the summer and early fall of 1931 and returned to write a book on his experiences, Dawn of Russia, published in 1932. Frank also went to Harlan County, Kentucky, in 1932 in support of striking coal miners on behalf of the Independent Miners Relief Committee, where he was attacked by vigilantes and forcibly removed from the strike area.

By the middle 1930s, Frank had moved close to the Communist Party, USA (CPUSA), culminating in his being tapped as speaker at the opening session of the founding convention of Communist-organized League of American Writers in April 1935. Frank was subsequently elected as the chairman of that organization.

During the United States Presidential election of 1936, Frank was active in the ranks of Professional Groups for Browder and Ford, working in support of the CPUSA ticket. Frank's efforts on behalf of the Communist Party brought him some minor legal trouble when he was arrested together with CPUSA General Secretary Earl Browder when the two were campaigning in Terre Haute, Indiana, on September 30, 1936.

In January 1937, Frank went to Mexico to attend the congress of the League of Revolutionary Artists and Writers. There he interviewed Leon Trotsky, held by the Joseph Stalin-led world Communist movement to be the leader of an international conspiracy to sabotage and overthrow the government of the USSR and the Russian Revolution itself. Upon his return to the United States, Frank suggested in a letter to The New Republic that an international tribunal be established to investigate the merit or lack thereof regarding the charges made by the Soviet against Trotsky. This brought a harsh reply from Earl Browder, leading to a break between Frank and the Communist Party and his denunciation by Browder at the Second Convention of the League of American Writers in June 1937.

Frank largely removed himself from political activity during the 1950s until in the fall of 1959 he visited revolutionary Cuba and was impressed enough to temporarily accept the position of chairman of the Fair Play for Cuba Committee. He published his final book, Cuba: Prophetic Island, a sympathetic account of the Cuban revolution, in 1961.

=== Hispanic cultural studies ===
Waldo Frank was regarded as a living cultural bridge between North America and Latin America.

Already believing in Hispanic spiritual values, Frank traveled to Spain in 1921. He published his cultural study, Virgin Spain (1926). He had envisioned that there needed to be an organic synthesis of the two Americas: North and South, Anglo and Hispanic. He thought that Spain had achieved a "spiritual synthesis of its warring religions" and could be "an example of wholeness" for the New World. Having also spent time in Spain, writer Ernest Hemingway mocked Frank's ideas in his book, Death in the Afternoon (1932).

Frank's book, Rediscovery of America (1929), also expressed some of his utopian ideas. After this and other books were less commercially successful than he thought they deserved, Frank turned his attention to politics. His thesis about the spiritual strengths of Latin America won him wide acclaim when he toured there in 1929. His lecture tour was organized by the University of Mexico, as well as Argentinian editor Samuel Glusberg and Peruvian cultural and political theorist José Carlos Mariátegui. The latter had serialized parts of Rediscovery of America (without Frank's authorization) in the journal Amauta.

It was in South America that Frank's literary influence was greatest. Latin American literary and political figures saw in Frank a possibility for cooperation with the United States. Frank's thought paralleled, in some aspects, the anti-imperialism of the Generation of 98, the Arielismo of Jose Enrique Rodo and the mysticism of José Vasconcelos. Frank was also responsible for the beginnings of a literary exchange between the U.S. and Latin American, introducing authors from both sides to each public. Victoria Ocampo was convinced by Frank to begin a literary journal in Argentina, which became Sur, one of the most important literary journal in Latin America. Due to his successful reception in Latin America, the United States State Department asked him to tour in 1942, to try to discourage alliances with the Nazi government in Germany during World War II. At first Frank turned down the offer because he felt the connection to the government might stain his more independent reputation. He later agreed, though, to help denounce the pro-Nazi drift of the Argentine government, which declared him a persona non grata. During his stay in Buenos Aires, Frank was attacked in his apartment by six armed men in response to "some opinions he expressed in regards to Argentine neutrality" in the war. He was pistol-whipped and repeatedly kicked in the head. He suffered a "concussion of marked severity." The attack was believed to be the work of pro-Nazi sympathizers who posed as detectives checking to see if Frank's "papers were in order."

Based on his travels in the region and continuing studies, Frank published South American Journey in 1943 and Birth of a World: Simon Bolivar in Terms of His Peoples in 1951.

=== Death and legacy ===
Waldo Frank died January 9, 1967, in White Plains, New York.

== Bibliography ==
=== Books ===
- Frank, Waldo (1917). The unwelcome man : a novel. Boston: Little, Brown. Also in Project Gutenberg
- — (1919). Our America. New York: Boni & Liveright.
- — (1920). The dark mother: a novel. New York: Boni & Liveright. Also in Project Gutenberg
- — (1922). City block. Darien, Conn.: Waldo Frank.
- — (1922). Rahab. New York: Boni & Liveright. Also in Project Gutenberg
- — (1923). Holiday. New York: Boni & Liveright.
- Chalk Face (1924)
- Virgin Spain: Scenes from the Spiritual Drama of a Great People (1926)
- The Rediscovery of America. An Introduction to a Philosophy of American Life (1929)
- Primer mensaje a la América Hispana, (1929) published in Revista de Occidente, (Madrid, 1930)
- South of Us (published in Spanish as América Hispana) (1931)
- Dawn in Russia: The Record of a Journey (1932)
- The Death and Birth of David Markand (1934)
- The Bridegroom Cometh (1938)
- Chart for Rough Water (1940)
- Summer Never Ends (1941)
- The Jew In Our Day (1944)
- Island in the Atlantic (1946)
- The Invaders (1948)
- Birth of a World: Bolivar in Terms of his Peoples (1951)
- Not Heaven (1953)
- Bridgehead: The Drama of Israel (1957)
- The Rediscovery of Man (1958)
- The Prophetic Island: A Portrait of Cuba (1961)
- In the American Jungle, 1925–1936 (1968), collected essays
- Memoirs (1973)

=== Essays and reporting ===
- Search-Light (April 4, 1925). "Fez and the Dark Age". The New Yorker. Vol. 1, no. 7. pp. 11–12.
- Search-light (April 18, 1925). "291". Profiles. The New Yorker. Vol. 1, no. 9. pp. 9–10. Alfred Stieglitz.
- — (May 2, 1925). "The new Conquistadores". The New Yorker. Vol. 1, no. 11. pp. 7–8.
- Searchlight (May 23, 1925). "Funny-Legs". Profiles. The New Yorker. Vol. 1, no. 14. pp. 9–10. Charlie Chaplin.
- Search-light (May 30, 1925). "Ennobling our criminals". The New Yorker. Vol. 1, no. 15. p. 21.
- — (June 6, 1925). "In the menagerie". The New Yorker. Vol. 1, no. 16. p. 8.
- Waldo Frank (June–August 1930). "A Note on D. H. Lawrence". The New Adelphi. Vol. III, no. 4. pp. 320–321.
