= Seven Arts (literary journal) =

American literary periodical

The Seven Arts
- Former editors: James Oppenheim, Waldo Frank, and Van Wyck Brooks
- Categories: Literary journal
- First issue: 1916
- Final issue: 1917
- Country: United States
- Language: English

The Seven Arts, an early example of the little magazine, was edited by James Oppenheim, Waldo Frank, and Van Wyck Brooks; it appeared monthly from November 1916 through October 1917. Jointly envisaged by Oppenheim and Frank, The Seven Arts was an attempt to anticipate and influence the United States' emerging “renascent period;” in the first issue the editors explain: “In short, The Seven Arts is not a magazine for artists, but an expression of artists for the community.” Of the many contributors to the magazine, Sherwood Anderson, J. D. Beresford, Randolph Bourne, Theodore Dreiser, Robert Frost, Kahlil Gibran, D. H. Lawrence, Amy Lowell, Paul Rosenfeld, and Louis Untermeyer were among the most prolific.

== History ==
The idea of The Seven Arts was first conceived by Oppenheim and Frank at a party in Greenwich Village; Frank, who had many literary contacts, would serve as associate editor and find contributors for the magazine. Oppenheim would serve as editor, and by this time, had already met Annette Rankine, who agreed to finance the magazine. Rankine had no influence over editorial decisions, but when her family pressured her over the magazine's increasingly hostile attitude toward the U.S.’s involvement in the First World War, which culminated in The Seven Arts’s acerbic August 1917 issue, she withdrew her support and killed herself shortly thereafter. All three editors contributed material to the magazine; Oppenheim wrote several poems and editorials for The Seven Arts, although his most significant achievement may have been organizing the superb, but potentially discordant contributions that continually came in: “I took hold of the blessed thing and each month studied our available material carefully, composing the next number somewhat as if I were composing a symphony or painting a picture: there had to be balance, homogeneity, a something that united the whole, an ensemble effect that was pleasurable.”

Randolph Bourne, perhaps the most brilliant contributor to The Seven Arts, certainly its most coherent voice criticizing the war, disrupted Oppenheim's “ensemble effect.” Bourne's scathing anti-war pieces for The Seven Arts, “The War and the Intellectuals” (June 1917), “Below the Battle” (July 1917), “The Collapse of American Strategy” (August 1917), “A War Diary” (September 1917), and "Twilight of Idols" (October 1917), were audacious, brave, and discordant. The tensions that Oppenheim carefully balanced each month between artistic expression and political revelation snapped, The Seven Arts collapsed, and one year later Bourne was dead. Others offered to back the magazine, but the editors were unable to find an agreeable means of sharing responsibilities and power. Historian Casey Nelson Blake writes: “The posthumous idealization of the Seven Arts reflects a widespread sentiment, on the part of its survivors and historians, that the journal was itself part of a ‘potential America’ crushed in the stampede to total war, antiradical hysteria, and ‘normalcy’” (123).
