= Twilight of the Gods =

Twilight of the Gods may refer to:

- Ragnarök, in Norse mythology, a series of major events foretold to result in the death of a number of gods

== Music ==
- Twilight of the Gods (opera) (Götterdämmerung), the last of the four operas by Richard Wagner that make up The Ring of the Nibelung
- Twilight of the Gods (album), by Bathory, 1991
- Twilight of the Gods, a Bathory tribute band and supergroup, fronted by Alan Averill
- "Twilight of the Gods", a song by Blind Guardian from Beyond the Red Mirror, 2014
- "Twilight of the Gods", a song by Helloween from Keeper of the Seven Keys: Part I, 1987
- "Twilight of the Gods", a song by Virgin Steele from The Marriage of Heaven and Hell Part II, 1996

== Literature ==
=== Fiction ===
- "Ragnarok, the Twilight of the Gods", a short story from The Age of Fable, or Stories of Gods and Heroes, an 1855 collection by Thomas Bulfinch
- "The Twilight of the Gods", a short story from Norse Stories, Retold from the Eddas, an 1882 collection by Hamilton Wright Mabie
- The Twilight of the Gods and Other Tales, an 1888 collection of short stories by Richard Garnett
- "The Twilight of the Gods", a short story from Myths of the Northern Lands, an 1895 collection by H. A. Guerber
- The Twilight of the Gods, a 1915 novel by Josephine Daskam Bacon
- "The Twilight of the Gods", a short story from The Children of Odin, a 1920 collection by Padraic Colum
- Twilight of the Gods (Hamilton collection), a 1948 collection of short stories by Edmond Hamilton
- "The Twilight of the Gods", a narrative poem from The Dark Chateau, a 1951 collection of poems by Clark Ashton Smith
- Twilight of the Gods, a 1985-87 trilogy of novels by Dennis Schmidt
- Twilight of the Gods (Bulis novel), a 1996 novel by Christopher Bulis from the Virgin Missing Adventures series
- Twilight of the Gods (Clapham and Miller novel), a 1999 novel by Mark Clapham and Jon de Burgh Miller from the Virgin New Adventures series
- Twilight of the Gods, a 2020 novel by Scott Oden
- Twilight of the Gods, a 2022 novel by Ann Chamberlin

=== Non-fiction ===
- Twilight of the Gods: The Beatles in Retrospect, a 1973 book about The Beatles by Wilfrid Mellers
- Twilight of the Gods: War in the Western Pacific, 1944–1945, a 2000 history book, the third volume in The Pacific War Trilogy, by Ian W. Toll
- Twilight of the Gods: A Journey to the End of Classic Rock, a 2018 book by Steven Hyden

== Television and film ==
- Twilight of the Gods (TV series), a 2024 Norse mythology-inspired adult animated series
- "Twilight of the Gods" (Inspector Morse), an episode of Inspector Morse
- Twilight of the Gods, a 1995 short starring Marton Csokas

== See also ==
- "The Twilight of the Grey Gods", a 1962 short story by Robert E. Howard
- The Twilight of the Golds, a 1993 play by Jonathan Tolins
- The Twilight of the Golds (film), a 1997 film adaptation of Jonathan Tolins's play
- Twilight of the Idols (disambiguation)
- Twilight of the Superheroes, a crossover storyline developed by Alan Moore
- Twilight of the Gods: Age of Revelation, a 2017 expandable mythology card game, designed by Chris Kluwe and published by Victory Point Games
- Twilight for the Gods, a 1958 film
