= Henry McBride (art critic) =

American art critic (1867–1962)

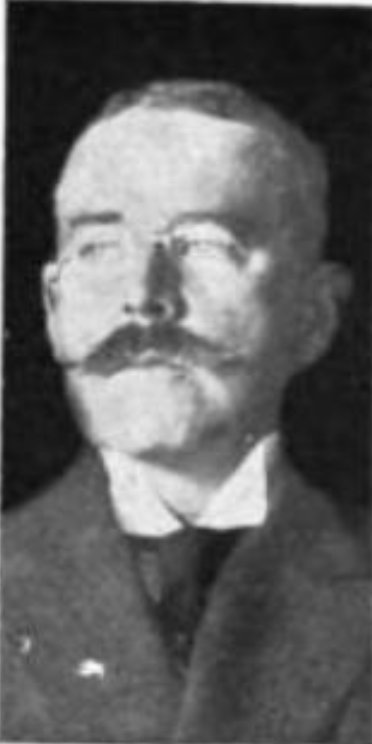
McBride in 1906

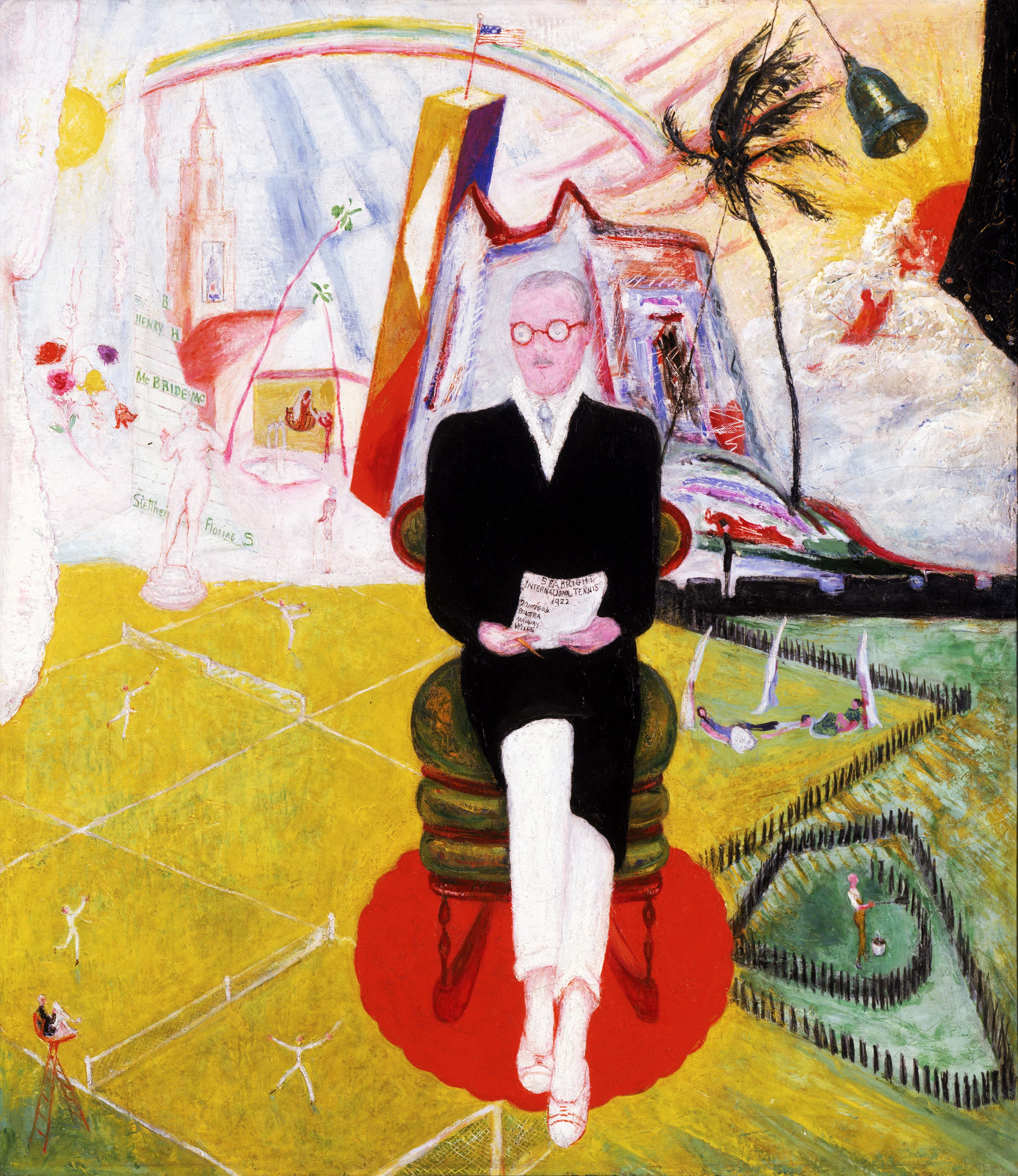
"Henry McBride, Art Critic" oil on canvas painting created by his friend Florine Stettheimer in 1922

Henry McBride (July 25, 1867 – March 31, 1962) was an American art critic known for his support of modern artists, both European and American, in the first half of the twentieth century. As a writer during the 1920s for the newspaper The New York Sun and the avant-garde magazine The Dial, McBride became one of the most influential supporters of modern art in his time. He also wrote for Creative Art (1928-1932) and Art News (1950-1959). Living to be ninety-five, McBride was born in the era of Winslow Homer and the Hudson River School and lived to see the rise of Jackson Pollock, Mark Rothko, and the New York School.

== Early life ==
McBride was born in West Chester, Pennsylvania, to Quaker parents. He studied art in New York City at the Artist-Artisan Institute and later took night classes at the Art Students League of New York. He started the art department of The Educational Alliance and directed the Trenton School of Industrial Arts in New Jersey for five years. Among the students in his drawing classes were men who went on to make a considerable reputation, including Samuel Halpert, Jacob Epstein, and Abraham Walkowitz.

== Career ==
McBride came to art criticism late in life, but his timing was excellent. Hired in 1913, at forty-five, as a second-string writer under New York Sun critic Samuel Swift, McBride found employment on a newspaper known for its strong writers and enthusiastic coverage of the arts, and he began covering the New York art scene in the year of the famous Armory Show, America's first large-scale introduction to European modernism. Initially, his prospects for advancement did not look good. The instructions he was given were blunt: "Don't be highbrow." That was the province of his boss. But during his first winter on the job, Swift had a falling-out with the newspaper's publisher and, as McBride wrote, he was happily obliged "to shift my brow into high." He was made responsible for covering all of the major exhibitions in the city's museums and principal galleries in one of the most exciting cultural periods in New York history. McBride worked for the Sun for the next thirty-six years. Let go at the age of eighty-three when the newspaper merged with another, less arts-conscious newspaper, he promptly started writing a monthly column with Art News.

McBride became known as a supporter of the modern movement. He had ambition to become an artist himself. He had made sketching trips to Europe, to study colour theory and composition techniques. He became popular early in his career; Vanity Fair listed him in its 1915 honor roll of "eight established critics" only two years after the appearance of his first weekly column. He aligned himself with the avant garde, supporting movements such as Post-Impressionism, Cubism, Fauvism, Precisionism, and others opposed to traditional approaches.

McBride had an uncanny ability to discover major talent early. Reviewing the first exhibition of Charles Demuth, he marked the watercolorist as someone to watch, though he was knowledgeable enough about contemporary art to hope that Demuth would not fall too much under the influence of the equally talented John Marin. Originality was everything to McBride. He felt he saw a great deal of originality at 291, the advanced gallery run by Alfred Stieglitz which often exhibited work that left other critics puzzled or indignant. He applauded, long before most of his colleagues in the art press, the work of Seurat, Matisse, Kandinsky, Gaston Lachaise, Max Weber, Rufino Tamayo, Joan Miró, Charles Sheeler, Charles Burchfield, Georgia O'Keeffe, Elie Nadelman, and Yasuo Kuniyoshi. He helped to promote the Thomas Eakins revival at the time of the Metropolitan Museum's 1916 retrospective and shared his love of folk art with his readers. He met Gertrude Stein on a trip to Paris in 1913 and became an admirer of both her collection and her adventurous writing, and he saw Marcel Duchamp not as the threatening figure many did in World War I-era New York but as a liberating, comic spirit. His coverage of the opening of the Stein-Virgil Thomson opera Four Saints in Three Acts in Hartford in 1934 was lengthy and appreciative, and he participated in the series of lectures sponsored by Katherine Dreier and the Societe Anonyme, aimed at promoting an understanding of modernism to the general public.

McBride's response to modern art was not one of unquestioning support. The first show of the paintings of Oscar Bluemner at Stieglitz's gallery elicited a strongly negative reaction, and he did not think highly of The Eight. A critic for whom Cézanne and Matisse became the most significant painters of the time wanted something more than Bluemner's strident color effects and the urban realism of The Eight. He also disliked the dark, brooding paintings of Max Beckmann, today recognized as the greatest of the German Expressionists.

Neither a scholar nor a specialist, McBride wrote in an impressionistic, conversational, even chatty and at times fey style. Reviewing an exhibition that contained the first Florine Stettheimer painting he had ever seen (he would become a great fan and close friend of the painter), he wrote admiringly and drolly about her whimsical picnic scene, La Fete a Duchamp. He concluded his review by noting that "Miss Stettheimer appears to be a good provider. The more I think of it, the more miffed I am that I wasn't asked to that party." McBride meant that statement both literally and metaphorically: modern art was a great party, he had decided, and he did not intend—or want his readers—to miss out on the fun. Some collectors, like Duncan Phillips, were so taken with McBride's judgment and captivating style that they waited to read his reviews before making a purchase.

Even into the 1940s and 1950s, at an age when many people are less open to new cultural experiences, McBride continued to search for young talent to praise. He was one of the first champions of Milton Avery, whose playful sense of form and gentle color effects thoroughly charmed him. When he referred admiringly to Avery as "the W.C. Fields of painters," the artist knew what he meant. Humor is an element in Avery's work, not fully noticed even today. He also wrote approvingly of the work of Pollock, Rothko, Morris Graves, and Bradley Walker Tomlin. "Although McBride's life and era were drawing to a close, he remained receptive to the next phase."

Friendship with the artists he wrote about was an important part of McBride's life. He made reference to "Gertrude and Alice" in his columns, attended the midtown salon evenings at the Stettheimer apartment, and relished the company of Matisse, Duchamp, Stieglitz, O'Keeffe, and Peggy Bacon. Like Demuth, McBride was gay, though not openly so, and found a welcoming circle of friends in the cosmopolitan world of modernist New York and Paris.

== Portraits ==
Florine Stettheimer honored her friend by painting two works that are about, or include, him. Her 1922 portrait, an affectionate satire (in the collection of the Smith College Museum of Art), shows McBride prissily seated on a plump cushion while keeping score at a tennis match (the critic as score-keeper?), against a rollicking background filled with fanciful allusions to artists McBride liked: Demuth, Lachaise, Homer, and Stettheimer herself. Her 1942 Cathedrals of Art, in the collection of the Metropolitan Museum of Art, portrays McBride daintily waving STOP and GO signs at the foot of the grand staircase of the Metropolitan, deciding which artists shall enter its precincts and who shall not. He was also the subject of a portrait bust by Gaston Lachaise as well as drawings by Peggy Bacon, Jules Pascin, and others.

== Sources ==
Kirstein, Lincoln. "Henry McBride," introductory essay to an unpaginated exhibition catalogue, Knoedler Galleries, 1947.

Loughery, John. "The New York Sun and Modern Art in America: Charles Fitzgerald, Frederick James Gregg, James Gibbons Huneker, Henry McBride," Arts Magazine (December 1984), pp. 77–82.

Rich, Daniel Catton (ed.). The Flow of Art: The Essays and Criticism of Henry McBride, New York: Atheneum, 1975.

Watson, Steven and Catherine Morris (ed.). An Eye on the Modern Century: Selected Letters of Henry McBride, New Haven: Yale University Press, 2000.
