= Paul Rosenfeld =

American journalist and music critic (1890–1946)

- Born: Paul Rosenfeld; May 4, 1890; New York City
- Died: July 21, 1946 (age 56); New York City
- Occupation: Journalist
- Known for: Music critic
- Parent(s): Clara Liebmann Rosenfield; Julius Rosenfield
- Family: Samuel Liebmann (great grandfather)

Paul Leopold Rosenfeld (May 4, 1890 – July 21, 1946) was an American journalist, best known as a music critic.

== Biography ==
He was born in New York City into a German-Jewish family, the son of Clara (née Liebmann) and Julius Rosenfield. His mother was the granddaughter of brewer Samuel Liebmann. He studied at Riverview Military Academy, Poughkeepsie, and Yale University, graduating in 1912.

After further education at the Columbia University Graduate School of Journalism, he became a prolific journalist, writing on literature and art as well as music. He was one of the Alfred Stieglitz circle, and favoured an intellectually heavyweight and quite European approach. His friend Edmund Wilson, writing two years after Rosenfeld's death, expressed the thought that his articles had become too uncompromising for the public taste, as time went by. Wilson's tribute was republished in his own book Classics and Commercials in 1950.

Magazines which published Rosenfeld's writing included The New Republic, Seven Arts, Vanity Fair magazine, The Nation, The Dial and Modern Music. He edited Seven Arts from 1916 to 1918, and was an editor of the American Caravan yearbooks.

The Boy in the Sun (1928) was an autobiographical novel.

Paul Rosenfeld died in St. Vincent's Hospital shortly after he had suffered a heart attack while attending a motion picture. He was 56 years old.
