= Cane (novel) =

1923 novel by Jean Toomer

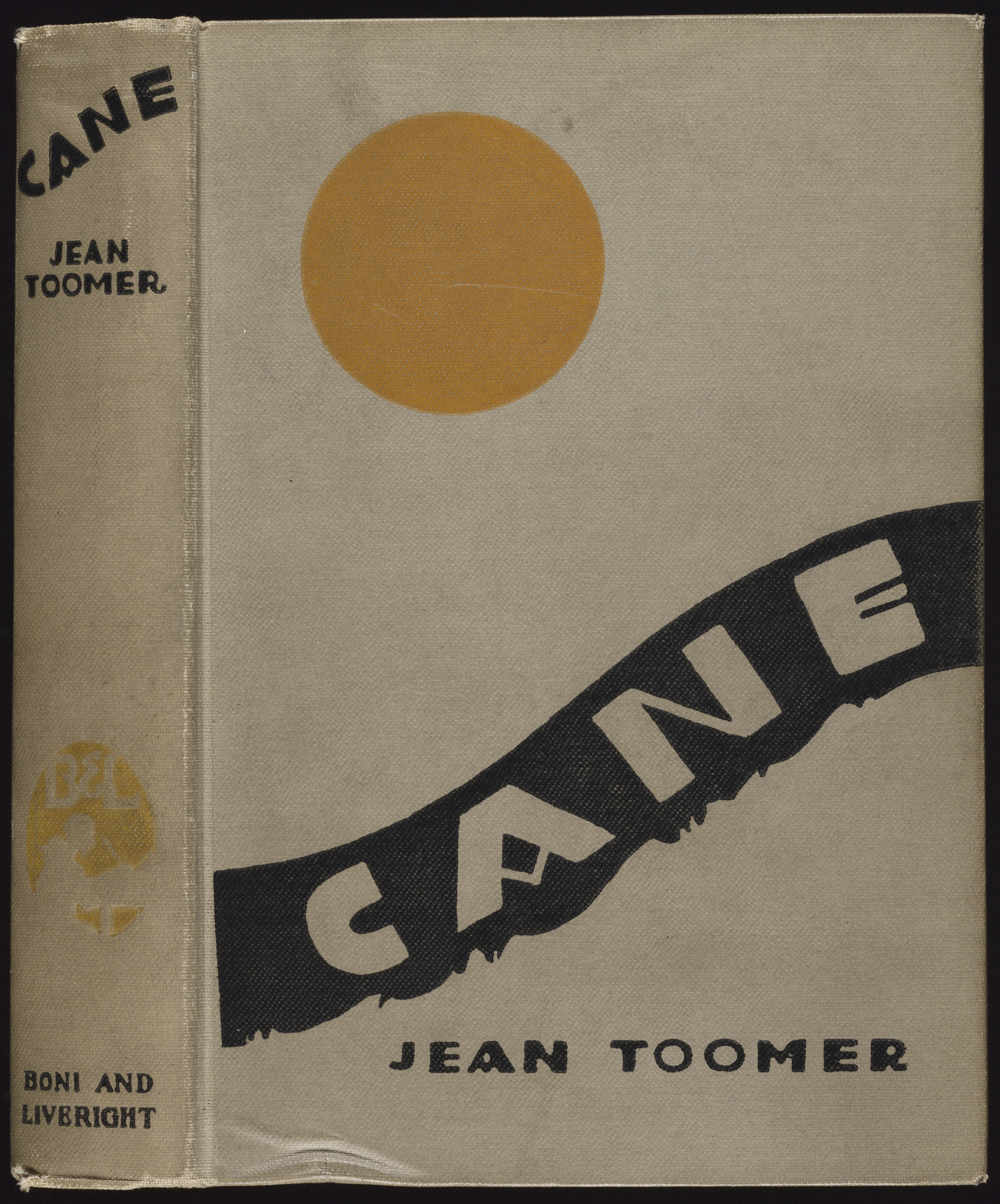
- First edition (Publ. Boni and Liveright)
- Author: Jean Toomer
- Language: English
- Publisher: Boni and Liveright
- Publication date: 1923; 103 years ago
- Publication place: United States
- Media type: Print
- Pages: 239 p.
- ISBN: 9780871405357
- OCLC: 168697
- Text: Cane at Wikisource

Cane is a 1923 novel by noted Harlem Renaissance author Jean Toomer. The novel is structured as a series of vignettes revolving around the origins and experiences of African Americans in the United States. The vignettes alternate in structure between narrative prose, poetry, and play-like passages of dialogue. As a result, the novel has been classified as a composite novel or as a short story cycle. Though some characters and situations recur in different vignettes, the vignettes are mostly freestanding, tied to the other vignettes thematically and contextually more than through specific plot details.

The novel's ambitious and unconventional structure is frequently discussed in the context of modernism. Some of the vignettes from the novel have been excerpted and included in literary collections, while the poetic passage "Harvest Song" has been featured in multiple Norton poetry anthologies. The poem begins with the line: "I am a reaper whose muscles set at sundown."

== Writing Cane ==
Jean Toomer began writing sketches that would become the first section of Cane in November 1921 on a train from Georgia to Washington D.C. By Christmas of 1921, the first draft of those sketches and the short story "Kabnis" were complete. Waldo Frank, Toomer's close friend, suggested that Toomer combine the sketches into a book. In order to form a book-length manuscript, Toomer added sketches relating to the black urban experience. When Toomer completed the book, he wrote: "My words had become a book…I had actually finished something."

However, before the book was published, Toomer's initial euphoria began to fade. He wrote, "The book is done but when I look for the beauty I thought I'd caught, they thin out and elude me." He thought that the Georgia sketches lacked complexity and said they were "too damn simple for me." In a letter to Sherwood Anderson, Toomer wrote that the story-teller style of "Fern" "had too much waste and made too many appeals to the reader."

In August 1923, Toomer received a letter from Horace Liveright asking for revisions to the bibliographic statement Toomer had submitted for promotions of the book. Liveright requested that Toomer mention his "colored blood," because that was the "real human interest value" of his story. Toomer had a history of complex beliefs about his own racial identity, and in the spring of 1923 he had written to the Associated Negro Press saying he would be pleased to write for the group's black readership on events that concerned them. However, when Toomer read Liveright's letter he was outraged. He responded that his "racial composition" was of no concern to anyone except himself, and asserted that he was not a "Negro" and would not "feature" himself as such. Toomer was even willing to cancel the publication of the book.

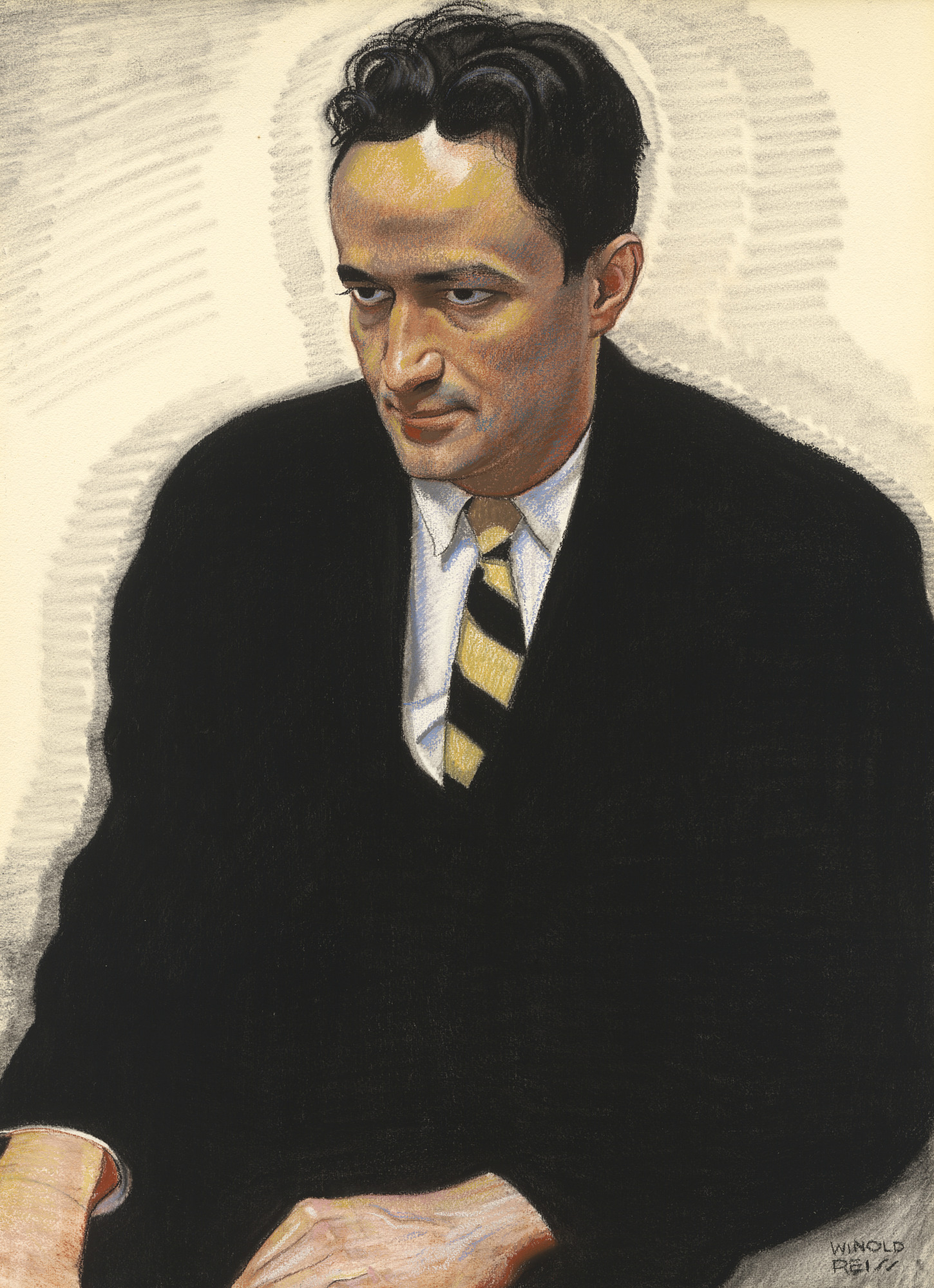
Drawing of Jean Toomer by Winold Reiss (c. 1925). Housed at the National Portrait Gallery. Public domain.

== Structure ==
Toomer spent a great deal of time working on the structure of Cane. He said that the design was a circle. Aesthetically, Cane builds from simple to complex forms; regionally, it moves from the South to the North and then back to the South; and spiritually, it begins with "Bona and Paul," grows through the Georgia narratives, and ends in "Harvest Song." The first section focuses on southern folk culture; the second section focuses on urban life in Washington D.C. and Chicago; and the third section is about the racial conflicts experienced by a black Northerner living in the South.

In his autobiography, Toomer wrote: "I realized with deep regret, that the spirituals, meeting ridicule, would be certain to die out. With Negroes also the trend was towards the small town and then towards the city—and industry and commerce and machines. The folk-spirit was walking in to die on the modern desert. That spirit was so beautiful. Its death was so tragic. Just this seemed to sum life for me. And this was the feeling I put into Cane. Cane was a swan-song. It was a song of an end."

== Contents ==
Preamble

- "Cane" (poem)

First section:

- "Karintha" – A vignette about a young black woman desired by older men who wish "to ripen a growing thing too soon."
- "Reapers" – A poem written in couplets about reapers in a field, their "silent swinging," and the stark death of a field rat.
- "November Cotton Flower" – A sonnet written in couplets with images of death in nature in the octave. These images become "beauty so sudden" in the sestet.
- "Becky" – Vignette of an ostracized white woman with two black sons who lives in a small stone house with the railway.
- "Face" (poem)
- "Cotton Song" (poem)
- "Carma" – Vignette about a strong woman whose husband becomes involved in shady business.
- "Song of the Son" (poem)
- "Georgia Dusk" (poem)
- "Fern" (short story) – A Northern man attempts to woo a southern black woman, with strange results.
- "Nullo" (poem)
- "Evening Song" (poem)
- "Esther" – A young woman who works in a drug store ages and pines for the wandering preacher Barlo, eventually seeking him out.
- "Conversion" (poem)
- "'Portrait in Georgia" (poem)
- "Blood Burning Moon" – Black man Tom Burwell and white man Bob Stone each pursue the young Louisa, resulting in a violent encounter and a tragic climax.

Second section:

- "Seventh Street" – Brief vignette about a street which is "a bastard of Prohibition and the War."
- "Rhobert" – Brief vignette about a solitary man.
- "Avey" – A young college student pursues a lazy girl named Avey, but cannot figure out why.
- "Beehive" (poem)
- "Storm Ending" (poem)
- "Theater" – A dancer named Dorris seeks the approval and adoration of a patron named John.
- "Her Lips are Copper Wire" (poem)
- "Calling Jesus" – A brief vignette.
- "Box Seat" – Dan Moore lusts after a reluctant Muriel, and follows her to a dwarf fight, where he starts a scene.
- "Prayer" (poem)
- "Harvest Song" (poem)
- "Bona and Paul" – A story of indifferent love.

Third section:

- "Kabnis" – The piece is primarily a dialogue and has elements of a short play. For example, the dialogue does not use tags ("he said") or describe the thoughts of a speaker. There also seem to be stage directions. In addition, "Kabnis" has some non-dramatic elements; it does not follow the format of a professional play. The language consists of highly poetic descriptions with the narrator commenting on the characters' feelings.

== Critical reception ==
Cane was largely ignored during the Harlem Renaissance by the average white and African American reader. Langston Hughes addressed this in his essay "The Negro Artist and the Racial Mountain" by saying, "'O, be respectable, write about nice people, show how good we are,' say the Negroes. 'Be stereotyped, don't go too far, don't shatter our illusions about you, don't amuse us too seriously. We will pay you,' say the whites. Both would have told Jean Toomer not to write Cane. The colored people did not praise it. Although the critics gave it good reviews, the public remained indifferent. Yet (excepting the works of Du Bois) Cane contains the finest prose written by a Negro in America. And like the singing of Robeson it is truly racial." Hughes suggests that Cane failed to be popular among the masses because it did not reinforce white views of African Americans. It did not fit the model of the "Old Negro" and did not depict the lifestyle of African Americans living in Harlem that whites wanted to see.

Cane was not widely read when it was published but was generally praised by both black and white critics. Montgomery Gregory, an African American, wrote in his 1923 review: "America has waited for its own counterpart of Maran—for that native son who would avoid the pitfalls of propaganda and moralizing on the one hand and the snares of a false and hollow race pride on the other hand. One whose soul mirrored the soul of his people, yet whose vision was universal. Jean Toomer…is the answer to this call." Gregory criticized Toomer for his labored and puzzling style and for Toomer's overuse of the folk. Gregory believed that Toomer was biased towards folk culture and resented city life.

W. E. B. Du Bois reviewed Cane in 1924, saying: "Toomer does not impress me as one who knows his Georgia but he does know human beings." Du Bois goes on to say that Toomer does not depict an exact likeness of humans but rather depicts them like an Impressionist painter. Du Bois also wrote that Toomer's writing is deliberately puzzling—"I cannot, for the life of me, for instance, see why Toomer could not have made the tragedy of Carma something that I could understand instead of vaguely guess at."

In his 1939 review "The New Negro", Sanders Redding wrote: "Cane was experimental, a potpourri of poetry and prose, in which the latter element is significant because of the influence it had on the course of Negro fiction."

White critics who reviewed Cane in 1923 were mostly positive about the novel, praising its new portrayal of African Americans. John Armstrong wrote: "It can perhaps be safely said that the Southern negro, at least, has found an authentic lyric voice in Jean Toomer…there is nothing of the theatrical coon-strutting high-brown, none of the conventional dice-throwing, chicken-stealing nigger of musical comedy and burlesque in the pages of Cane." He goes on to say, "the Negro has been libeled rather than depicted accurately in American fiction" because fiction typically portrays African Americans as stereotypes. Cane gave white readers a chance to see a human portrayal of blacks—"[blacks] were seldom ever presented to white eyes with any other sort of intelligence than that displayed by an idiot child with epilepsy."

Robert Littell wrote in his 1923 review that "Cane does not remotely resemble any of the familiar, superficial views of the South on which we have been brought up. On the contrary, Mr. Toomer's view is unfamiliar and bafflingly subterranean, the vision of a poet far more than the account of things seen by a novelist."

== Modern criticism ==
Alice Walker said of the book, "It has been reverberating in me to an astonishing degree. I love it passionately, could not possibly exist without it."

In The Negro Novel in America, Robert A. Bone wrote: "By far the most impressive product of the Negro Renaissance, Cane ranks with Richard Wright's Native Son and Ralph Ellison's Invisible Man as a measure of the Negro novelist's highest achievement. Jean Toomer belongs to that first rank of writers who use words almost as a plastic medium, shaping new meanings from an original and highly personal style."

Gerald Strauss points out that despite "critical uncertainty and controversy," he finds that Cane's structure is not without precedent: "it is similar to James Joyce's Dubliners (1914) and Sherwood Anderson's Winesburg, Ohio (1919), two other thematically related story collections that develop unified and coherent visions of societies. It also echoes Edgar Lee Masters's poetry collection Spoon River Anthology (1915) ... Toomer surely was familiar with the Joyce and Masters books, and he knew Anderson personally."

== Legacy ==
In 1973, Alice Walker and fellow Zora Neale Hurston scholar Charlotte D. Hunt discovered a grave they thought was Hurston's in Ft. Pierce, Florida. Walker had it marked with a gray marker stating ZORA NEALE HURSTON / A GENIUS OF THE SOUTH / NOVELIST FOLKLORIST / ANTHROPOLOGIST / 1901–1960. The line "a genius of the south" is from Toomer's poem "Georgia Dusk", which appears in the novel. Hurston, who could be deceptive about her age, was actually born in 1891, not 1901.

The novel inspired the Gil Scott-Heron song "Cane", in which he sings about two main characters of the novel: Karintha and Becky.

The novel inspired Marion Brown in his "Georgia" trilogy of jazz albums, especially on Geechee Recollections (1973), where he put "Karintha" to music, recited by Bill Hasson.

== Critical studies (since 2000) ==
as of March 2008:

=== Book monographs / articles/chapters ===
1. Snaith, Anna, "C. L. R. James, Claude McKay, Nella Larsen, Jean Toomer: The 'Black Atlantic' and the Modernist Novel", in Shiach, The Cambridge Companion to the Modernist Novel, Cambridge, England: Cambridge University Press; 2007. pp. 206–23.
2. Lamothe, Daphne, "Cane: Jean Toomer's Gothic Black Modernism", in Anolik and Howard, The Gothic Other: Racial and Social Constructions in the Literary Imagination. Jefferson, NC: McFarland; 2004. pp. 54–71.
3. Petesch, Donald, "Jean Toomer's Cane", pp. 91–96, in Iftekharrudin, Boyden, Longo, and Rohrberger, Postmodern Approaches to the Short Story. Westport, CT: Praeger; 2003. xi, 156 pp. (book article)
4. Terris, Daniel, "Waldo Frank, Jean Toomer, and the Critique of Racial Voyeurism", in Hathaway, Heather (ed.); Jarab, Josef (ed. and introd.); Melnick, Jeffrey (ed.); Race and the Modern Artist. Oxford, England: Oxford University Press; 2003. pp. 92–114.
5. Fontenot, Chester J., Jr., "W. E. B. Du Bois's 'Of the Coming of John,' Toomer's 'Kabnis,' and the Dilemma of Self-Representation", in Hubbard, The Souls of Black Folk One Hundred Years Later. Columbia, MO: University of Missouri Press; 2003. pp. 130–60.
6. Griffin, John Chandler, Biography of American Author Jean Toomer, 1894–1967. Lewiston, NY: The Edwin Mellen Press; 2002.
7. Fahy, Thomas, "The Enslaving Power of Folksong in Jean Toomer's Cane", in Meyer, Literature and Music Amsterdam, Netherlands: Rodopi; 2002. pp. 47–63.
8. Lemke, Sieglinde, "Interculturalism in Literature, the Visual and Performing Arts during the Harlem Renaissance", in Martín Flores and von Son, Double Crossings/EntreCruzamientos, Fair Haven, NJ: Nuevo Espacio; 2001. pp. 111–21.
9. Wardi, Anissa J., "Divergent Paths to the South: Echoes of Cane in Mama Day", in Stave, Gloria Naylor: Strategy and Technique, Magic and Myth. Newark, DE; London, England: University of Delaware Press; Associated University Press; 2001. pp. 44–76.
10. Nicholls, David G., "Jean Toomer's Cane, Modernization, and the Spectral Folk", in Scandura and Thurston, Modernism, Inc.: Body, Memory, Capital. New York, NY: New York University Press; 2001. pp. 151–70.
11. Boelhower, William, "No Free Gifts: Toomer's 'Fern' and the Harlem Renaissance", in Fabre and Feith, Temples for Tomorrow: Looking Back at the Harlem Renaissance, Bloomington, IN: Indiana University Press; 2001. pp. 193–209.
12. Boutry, Katherine, "Black and Blue: The Female Body of Blues Writing in Jean Toomer, Toni Morrison, and Gayl Jones", in Simawe, Black Orpheus: Music in African American Fiction from the Harlem Renaissance to Toni Morrison. New York, NY: Garland; 2000. pp. 91–118.
13. Ickstadt, Heinz, "The (Re)Construction of an American Cultural Identity in Literary Modernism", in Hagenbüchle, Raab, and Messmer, Negotiations of America's National Identity, II. Tübingen, Germany: Stauffenburg; 2000. pp. 206–28.

==== Articles on Cane in the collection Jean Toomer and the Harlem Renaissance ====
(Ed. Geneviève Fabre and Michel Feith, New Brunswick, NJ: Rutgers University Press; 2001.)

1. Fabre, Geneviève, "Tight-Lipped 'Oracle': Around and Beyond Cane", pp. 1–17.
2. Sollors, Werner, "Jean Toomer's Cane: Modernism and Race in Interwar America", pp. 18–37.
3. Hutchinson, George, "Identity in Motion: Placing Cane", pp. 38–56.
4. Grandjeat, Yves-Charles, "The Poetics of Passing in Jean Toomer's Cane", pp. 57–67.
5. Clary, Françoise, "'The Waters of My Heart': Myth and Belonging in Jean Toomer's Cane", pp. 68–83.
6. Coquet, Cécile, "Feeding the Soul with Words: Preaching and Dreaming in Cane", pp. 84–95.
7. Michlin, Monica, "'Karintha': A Textual Analysis", pp. 96–108.
8. Fabre, Geneviève, "Dramatic and Musical Structures in 'Harvest Song' and 'Kabnis': Toomer's Cane and the Harlem Renaissance", pp. 109–27.
9. Nadell, Martha Jane, "Race and the Visual Arts in the Works of Jean Toomer and Georgia O'Keeffe", pp. 142–61.
10. Soto, Michael, "Jean Toomer and Horace Liveright: Or, A New Negro Gets 'into the Swing of It'", pp. 162–87.
11. Williams, Diana I., "Building the New Race: Jean Toomer's Eugenic Aesthetic", pp. 188–201.
12. Fabre, Michel, "The Reception of Cane in France", pp. 202–14.

=== Journal articles ===
1. Farebrother, Rachel, "Adventuring through the Pieces of a Still Unorganized Mosaic": Reading Jean Toomer's Collage Aesthetic in Cane, Journal of American Studies, December 2006; 40 (3): 503–21.
2. Baldanzi, Jessica Hays, "Stillborns, Orphans, and Self-Proclaimed Virgins: Packaging and Policing the Rural Women of Cane", Genders, 2005; 42: 39 paragraphs.
3. Banks, Kimberly, "'Like a Violin for the Wind to Play': Lyrical Approaches to Lynching by Hughes, Du Bois, and Toomer", African American Review, Fall 2004, 38 (3): 451–65.
4. Whalan, Mark, "'Taking Myself in Hand': Jean Toomer and Physical Culture", Modernism/Modernity, 2003 Nov; 10 (4): 597–615.
5. Ramsey, William M., "Jean Toomer's Eternal South", Southern Literary Journal, Fall 2003, 36 (1): 74–89.
6. Hedrick, Tace, "Blood-Lines That Waver South: Hybridity, the 'South,' and American Bodies", Southern Quarterly: A Journal of the Arts in the South, Fall 2003, 42 (1): 39–52.
7. Edmunds, Susan, "The Race Question and the 'Question of the Home': Revisiting the Lynching Plot in Jean Toomer's Cane", American Literature: A Journal of Literary History, Criticism, and Bibliography, March 2003, 75 (1): 141–68.
8. Whalan, Mark, "Jean Toomer, Technology, and Race", Journal of American Studies, December 2002, 36 (3): 459–72.
9. Battenfeld, Mary, "'Been Shapin Words T Fit M Soul': Cane, Language, and Social Change", Callaloo: A Journal of African-American and African Arts and Letters, Fall 2002, 25 (4): 1238–49.
10. Da-Luz-Moreira, Paulo, "Macunaíma e Cane: Sociedades Multi-raciais além do Modernismo no Brasil e nos Estados Unidos", Tinta, Fall 2001, 5: 75–90.
11. Scruggs, Charles, "Jean Toomer and Kenneth Burke and the Persistence of the Past", American Literary History, Spring 2001, 13 (1): 41–66.
12. Shigley, Sally Bishop, "Recalcitrant, Revered, and Reviled: Women in Jean Toomer's Short Story Cycle, Cane", Short Story, Spring 2001, 9 (1): 88–98.
13. Rand, Lizabeth A., "'I Am I': Jean Toomer's Vision beyond Cane", CLA Journal, September 2000, 44 (1): 43–64.
14. Fike, Matthew A., "Jean Toomer and Okot p'Bitek in Alice Walker's In Search of Our Mothers' Gardens", MELUS, Fall-Winter 2000, 25 (3-4): 141–60.
15. Peckham, Joel B., "Jean Toomer's Cane: Self as Montage and the Drive toward Integration", American Literature: A Journal of Literary History, Criticism, and Bibliography, June 2000, 72 (2): 275–90.
16. Webb, Jeff, "Literature and Lynching: Identity in Jean Toomer's Cane", ELH, Spring 2000, 67 (1): 205–28.
17. Bus, Heiner, "Jean Toomer's Cane as a Swan Song", Journal of American Studies of Turkey, 2000 Spring; 11: 21–29.
18. Harmon, Charles. "Cane, Race, and 'Neither/Norism'", Southern Literary Journal, Spring 2000, 32 (2): 90–101.
19. Scruggs, Charles. "The Reluctant Witness: What Jean Toomer Remembered from Winesburg, Ohio", Studies in American Fiction, 2000 Spring; 28 (1): 77–100.
20. Kodat, Catherine Gunther (Spring 2000). "To 'Flash White Light from Ebony': The Problem of Modernism in Jean Toomer's Cane". Twentieth Century Literature. 46 (1): 1–19. Archived from the original on October 16, 2004 – via FindArticles.
