= Twilight of Idols (essay) =

1917 essay by Randolph Bourne

"Twilight of Idols" is a 1917 essay by Randolph Bourne on the moral failings of instrumental pragmatist philosophy in the wake of American entry into World War I.

== Background and summary ==
Following the American entry into World War I in April 1917, the Seven Arts literary journal and left-wing intellectual circle began to publish several outspoken essays by Randolph Bourne, who had become ostracized from other publications for his anti-war stance. His series ended with the essay Twilight of Idols in the final issue of the magazine. In it, he described how instrumental pragmatism failed as a philosophy when confronted with the war question. He asked:

"What is the matter with the philosophy? One has the sense of having come to a sudden, short stop at the end of an intellectual era. in the crisis, this philosophy of intelligent control just does not measure up to our needs. What is the root of this inadequacy that is felt so keenly by our restless minds? Van Wyck Brooks has pointed out searchingly the lack of poetic vision in our pragmatic awakeners. Is there something in these realistic attitudes that works actually against poetic vision, against the concern for the quality of life as above machinery of life? Apparently there is."

Bourne called for other discontents to join him in critical defiance. His tone was direct yet devoid of political slogans.

Bourne contended that the preoccupations of instrumentalism with moral ends and proper means forgot about values. Similarly, pragmatists who uncritically focused on process and efficiency did not mind quality of life. The youth, Bourne wrote, were trained to execute on events but not to contemplate the intellectual worth of their outcomes. The idols referenced in Bourne's title were his former mentor, John Dewey, and other socialist luminaries of his generation, including Samuel Gompers, Algie Martin Simons, and John Spargo. He excoriated his generation's intellectuals as lacking a philosophy of life aside for connecting means to ends: "They are vague as to what kind of society they want, or what kind of society America needs, but they are equipped with all the administrative attitudes and talents necessary to attain it."

== Analyses ==
Clayton (1984) described the essay's publication, having attacked the main intellectuals of his era, as intellectual suicide. Vaughan (1997) observed:

"His 'Twilight of Idols,' triggered by Dewey's tolerance for the suspension of civil liberties' protections, reflected the 'war and laughter' of Nietzsche's original, exposing the cultural damage caused by the war at home as well as the consequences to pragmatism itself."
