= Jean Toomer =

American poet and novelist (1894–1967)

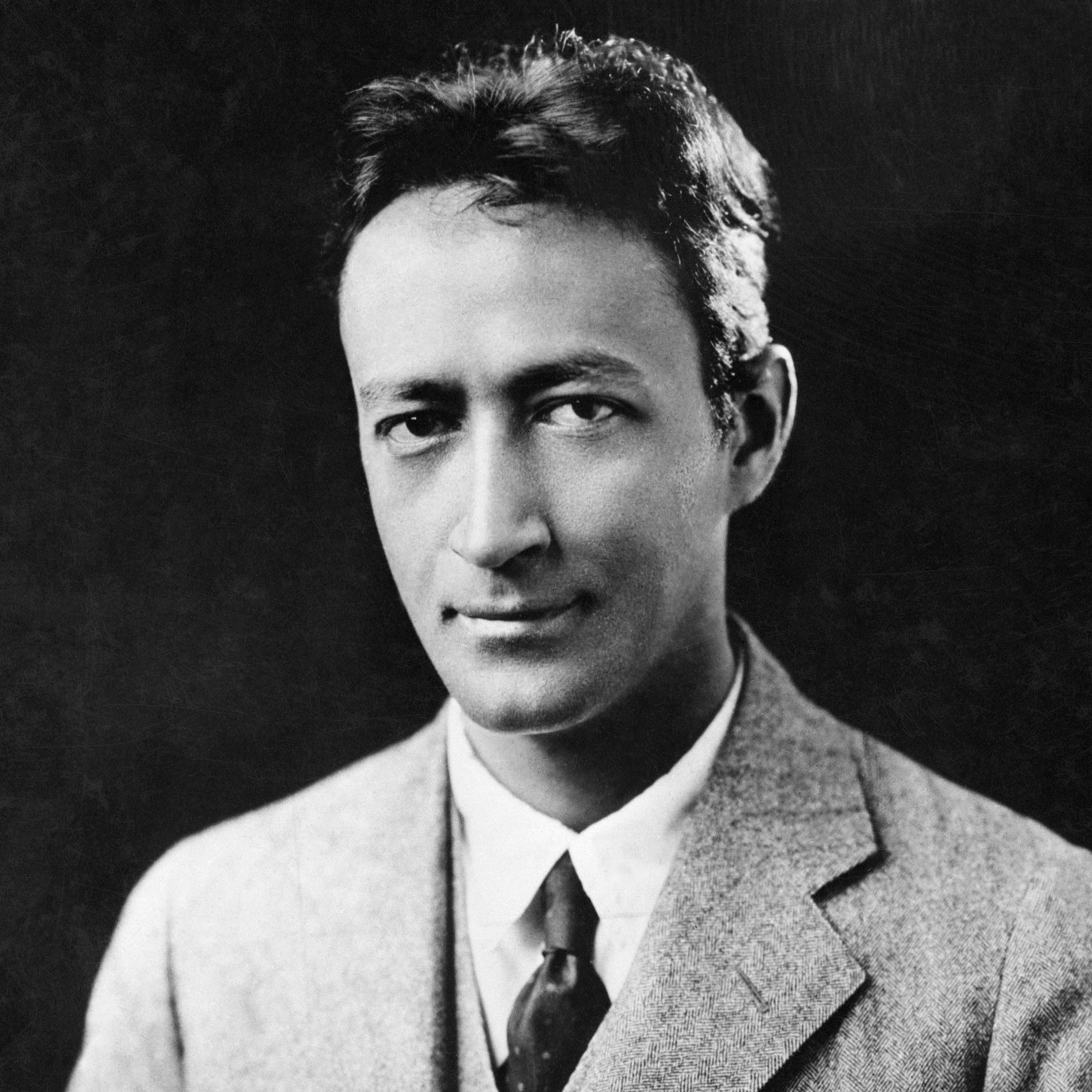
- Toomer in 1934
- Born: Nathan Pinchback Toomer; December 26, 1894; Washington, D.C., United States
- Died: March 30, 1967 (aged 72); Doylestown, Pennsylvania, United States
- Occupations: Poet, novelist
- Spouses: Margery Latimer (m. 1931; died 1932) Marjorie Content (m. 1934)
- Children: 1
- Writing career
- Notable work: Cane (1923)
- Movement: Modernism

Signature
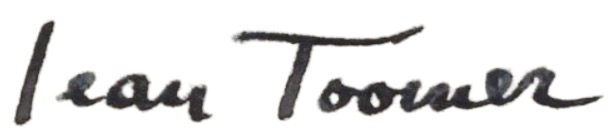

Jean Toomer (born Nathan Pinchback Toomer; December 26, 1894 – March 30, 1967) was an American poet and novelist commonly associated with modernism and the Harlem Renaissance, though he actively resisted the latter association. His reputation stems from his novel Cane (1923), which Toomer wrote during and after a stint as a school principal at a black school in rural Sparta, Georgia. The novel intertwines the stories of six women and includes an apparently autobiographical thread; sociologist Charles S. Johnson called it "the most astonishingly brilliant beginning of any Negro writer of his generation". He resisted being classified as a "Negro" writer and he identified as "American". For more than a decade Toomer was an influential follower and representative of the pioneering spiritual teacher G.I. Gurdjieff.

Toomer continued to write poetry, short stories and essays. His first wife died soon after the birth of their daughter. After he married again in 1934, Toomer moved with his family from New York to Doylestown, Pennsylvania. There, he became a member of the Religious Society of Friends (also known as Quakers) and retired from public life. His papers are held by the Beinecke Rare Book Library at Yale University.

== Ancestry ==
Born Nathan Pinchback Toomer in Washington, D.C. in 1894, the son of Nathan Toomer (1839–1906), a former enslaved man and farmer of mixed race, and his third wife, Nina Elizabeth Pinchback (1866–1909), whose parents became free people of color prior to the Civil War. His father was born into slavery in Chatham County, North Carolina and was later sold with members of his family to John Toomer, in Houston County, Georgia, in the 1850s. After the death of John Toomer, his brother Henry Toomer became owner of the family, with Nathan assigned to be his personal valet and assistant. Nathan would remain in this position after the Civil War and learned the ways of the white upper class. He later took his former enslaver's surname, "Toomer", after emancipation.

His father was married three times. His first marriage produced four daughters. After the death of his first wife, Nathan Sr. married Amanda America Dickson, a former enslaved woman of mixed race whose inheritance from her white father resulted in great wealth. She was called the "wealthiest colored woman in America." She died intestate in 1893 after about a year of marriage. A legal struggle with her children, which did not end until years after his third marriage, left the senior Nathan with little to no inheritance.

In 1893, the now 54-year-old widower married 28-year-old Nina Elizabeth Pinchback, another wealthy young woman of color. She was born in New Orleans as the third child of Nina Emily Hawthorne and politician P. B. S. Pinchback, both of mixed heritage. Her father was suspicious of Nathan Toomer and strongly opposed his daughter's choice for marriage, but he ultimately acquiesced. Born from this union and named "Nathan" after his father, Toomer would later use "Jean" as his first name at the start his literary career.

== Early life ==
Toomer's father soon abandoned his wife and his young son, returning to Georgia seeking to obtain a portion of his late second wife's estate. Nina divorced him and took back her maiden name of Pinchback; she and her son returned to live with her parents in Washington D.C. Angered by her husband's abandonment, Nina's father insisted that they use another name for her son and started calling him Eugene, after the boy's godfather. He received a variety of nicknames by various family members. Toomer would see his father only once more, in 1897, before Nathan Sr.'s death in 1906.

As a child in Washington D.C., Toomer attended segregated black schools. After his mother remarried, they moved to suburban New Rochelle, New York, and the youth began to attend an all-white school. Toomer returned to D.C. after his mother's death in 1909, when he was 15, and he lived with his maternal grandparents. He graduated from the M Street High School, a prestigious academic black high school in the city with a national reputation.

Toomer was enumerated as "Eugene P." Toomer on the 1900 U.S. Census, living with his mother in the household of his grandparents, Pinkney and Nina E. Pinchback. Everyone in the household was recorded as black. Eugene lived with his grandparents in 1910 as well, at which time his race was recorded as mulatto. When he registered for the World War I draft in 1917, he styled his name Eugene Pinchback Toomer, and he was identified as black by the draft board. "Jean" Toomer lived in Manhattan, New York, in 1920 and 1930, and his race was recorded as white by the census enumerators. "Nathan" is also recorded as white on the 1940 U.S. Census. When "Jean" registered for the World War II draft in 1942, he was identified as Negro. "Nathan" Toomer's 1967 death certificate also records his race as white.

== Education ==
Between 1914 and 1917, Jean attended six institutions of higher education (the University of Wisconsin, the Massachusetts College of Agriculture, the American College of Physical Training in Chicago, the University of Chicago, New York University, and the City College of New York), studying agriculture, fitness, biology, sociology, and history, but he never completed a degree. His wide readings among prominent contemporary poets and writers, and the lectures that he attended during his college years, shaped the direction of his writing.

== Career ==
After leaving college, Toomer returned to Washington, DC. He published some short stories and continued writing during the volatile social period following World War I. He worked for some months in a shipyard in 1919, then escaped to middle-class life. Labor strikes and race riots victimizing black people occurred in numerous major industrial cities during the summer of 1919, which became known as Red Summer as a result. At the same time, it was a period of artistic ferment.

Toomer devoted eight months to the study of Eastern philosophies and continued to be interested in this subject. Some of his early writing was political, and he published three essays from 1919 to 1920 in the prominent socialist paper New York Call. His work drew from the socialist and "New Negro" movements of New York. He also read new American writing, such as Waldo Frank's Our America (1919). In 1919, he adopted "Jean Toomer" as his literary name, and it was the way that he was known for most of his adult life.

By his early adult years, Toomer resisted racial classifications, wanting to be identified only as an American. He gained experience in both white and "colored" societies, and resisted being classified as a "Negro" writer. He grudgingly allowed his publisher of Cane to use that term to increase sales, as there was considerable interest in new black writers.

As Richard Eldridge noted, Toomer "sought to transcend standard definitions of race. I think he never claimed that he was a white man. He always claimed that he was a representative of a new, emergent race that was a combination of various races. He averred this virtually throughout his life." William Andrews has noted he "was one of the first writers to move beyond the idea that any black ancestry makes you black."

Drawing of Toomer by Winold Reiss (c. 1925). Housed at the National Portrait Gallery.

In 1921, Toomer took a job for a few months as a principal at a new rural agricultural and manual labor college for black people in Sparta, Georgia. Southern schools were continuing to recruit teachers from the North, although they had also trained generations of teachers since the Civil War. The school was in the center of Hancock County and the Black Belt 100 miles southeast of Atlanta, near where his father had lived. Exploring his father's roots in Hancock County, Toomer learned that he sometimes passed for white. Seeing the life of rural blacks, racial segregation, and virtual labor peonage in the Deep South led Toomer to identify more strongly as African American and with his father's past.

Several lynchings of black men took place in Georgia during 1921 and 1922, as whites continued to enforce white supremacy violently. In 1908, the state had ratified a constitution that disenfranchised most black people and many poor whites by raising barriers to voter registration. Other former Confederate states had passed similar laws since 1890, led by Mississippi, and they maintained such disenfranchisement essentially into the late 1960s.

By Toomer's time, the state was suffering labor shortages due to thousands of rural blacks leaving in the Great Migration to the North and Midwest. Planters feared losing their pool of cheap labor. Trying to control their movement, the legislature passed laws to prevent outmigration. It also established high license fees for Northern employers recruiting labor in the state. This was a formative period for Toomer; he started writing about it while still in Georgia and, while living in Hancock County, submitted the long story "Georgia Night" to the socialist magazine The Liberator in New York.

Toomer returned to New York, where he became friends with Waldo Frank. They had an intense friendship through 1923, and Frank served as his mentor and editor on his novel Cane. The two men came to have strong differences.

=== Cane ===
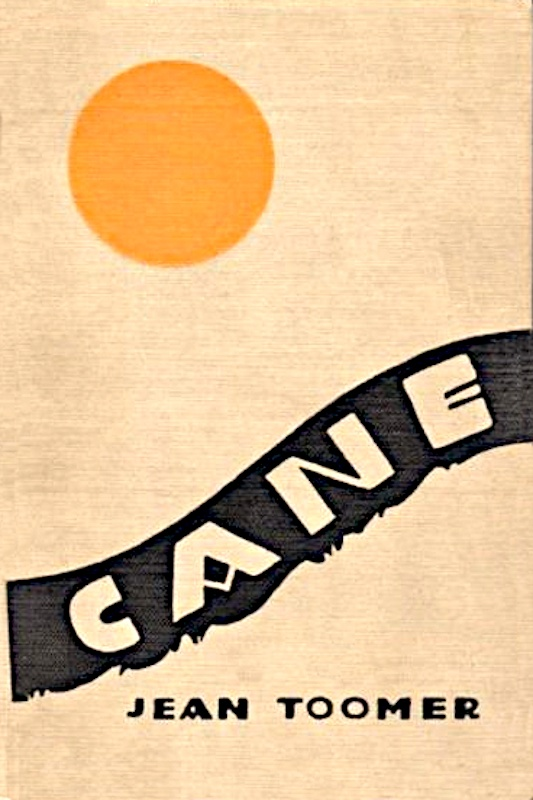
First edition cover of Cane (1923)

During Toomer's time as principal of Sparta Agricultural and Industrial Institute in Georgia, he wrote stories, sketches, and poems drawn from his experience there. These formed the basis for Cane, his High Modernist novel published in 1923. Cane was well received by both black and white critics. Cane was celebrated by well-known African-American critics and artists, including Claude McKay, Nella Larsen, Richard Wright, Langston Hughes and Wallace Thurman.

Cane is structured in three parts. The first third of the book is devoted to the black experience in the Southern farmland. The second part of Cane is more urban and concerned with Northern life. The conclusion of the work is a prose piece entitled "Kabnis." Houston A. Baker Jr. would call Toomer's Cane a "mysterious brand of Southern psychological realism that has been matched only in the best work of William Faulkner". Toomer was the first poet to unite folk culture and the elite culture of the white avant-garde.

The book was reissued in 1969, two years after Toomer's death. Cane has been assessed since the late 20th century as an "analysis of class and caste", with "secrecy and miscegenation as major themes of the first section". He had conceived it as a short-story cycle, in which he explores the tragic intersection of female sexuality, black manhood, and industrial modernization in the South. Toomer acknowledged the influence of Sherwood Anderson's Winesburg, Ohio (1919) as his model, in addition to other influential works of that period. He also appeared to have absorbed The Waste Land of T. S. Eliot and considered him to be one of the American group of writers that he wanted to join, "artists and intellectuals who were engaged in renewing American society at its multi-cultural core."

Many scholars have considered Cane to be Toomer's best work. Cane was hailed by critics and has been considered as an important work of both the Harlem Renaissance and Modernism. However, as previously stated, Toomer resisted racial classification and did not want to be marketed as a "Negro" writer. As he wrote to his publisher Horace Liveright, "My racial composition and my position in the world are realities that I alone may determine." Toomer found it more difficult to get published throughout the 1930s, the period of the Great Depression, as did many authors.

=== Later work ===
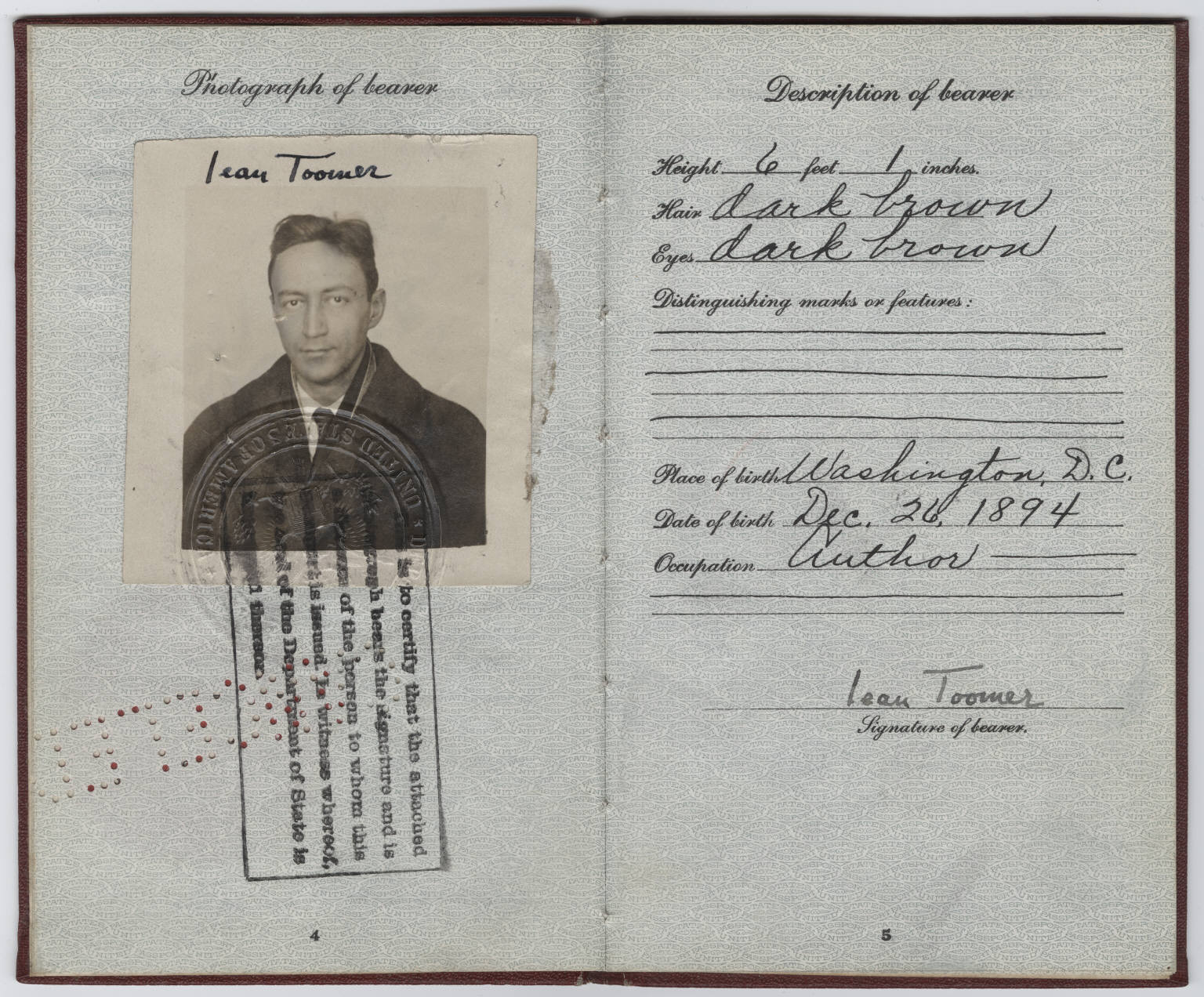
Jean Toomer's passport (1926)

In the 1920s, Toomer and Frank were among many Americans who became deeply interested in the work of the spiritual leader George Ivanovitch Gurdjieff, from Russia, who had a lecture tour in the United States in 1924. That year, and in 1926 and 1927, Toomer went to France for periods of study with Gurdjieff, who had settled at Fontainebleau. He was a student of Gurdjieff until the mid-1930s. Much of his writing from this period on was related to his spiritual quest and featured allegories. He no longer explored African-American characters. Some scholars have attributed Toomer's artistic silence to his ambivalence about his identity in a culture insistent on forcing binary racial distinctions. Wallace Thurman, Dorothy Peterson, Aaron Douglas, and Nella Larsen, along with Zora Neale Hurston and George Schuyler, were among those known to have been Toomer's students in the Gurdjieff work during this period.

Toomer continued with his spiritual exploration by traveling to India in 1939. Later, he studied the psychology developed by Carl Jung, the mystic Edgar Cayce, and the Church of Scientology, but reverted to Gurdjieff's philosophy.

Toomer wrote a small amount of fiction in this later period. Mostly he published essays in Quaker publications during these years. He devoted most of his time to serving on Quaker committees for community service and working with high school students.

His last literary work published during his lifetime was Blue Meridian, a long poem extolling, "the potential of the American race". He stopped writing for publication after 1950. He continued to write privately, however, including several autobiographies and a poetry volume titled, The Wayward and the Seeking. He died in 1967 after several years of poor health.

== Marriage and family ==
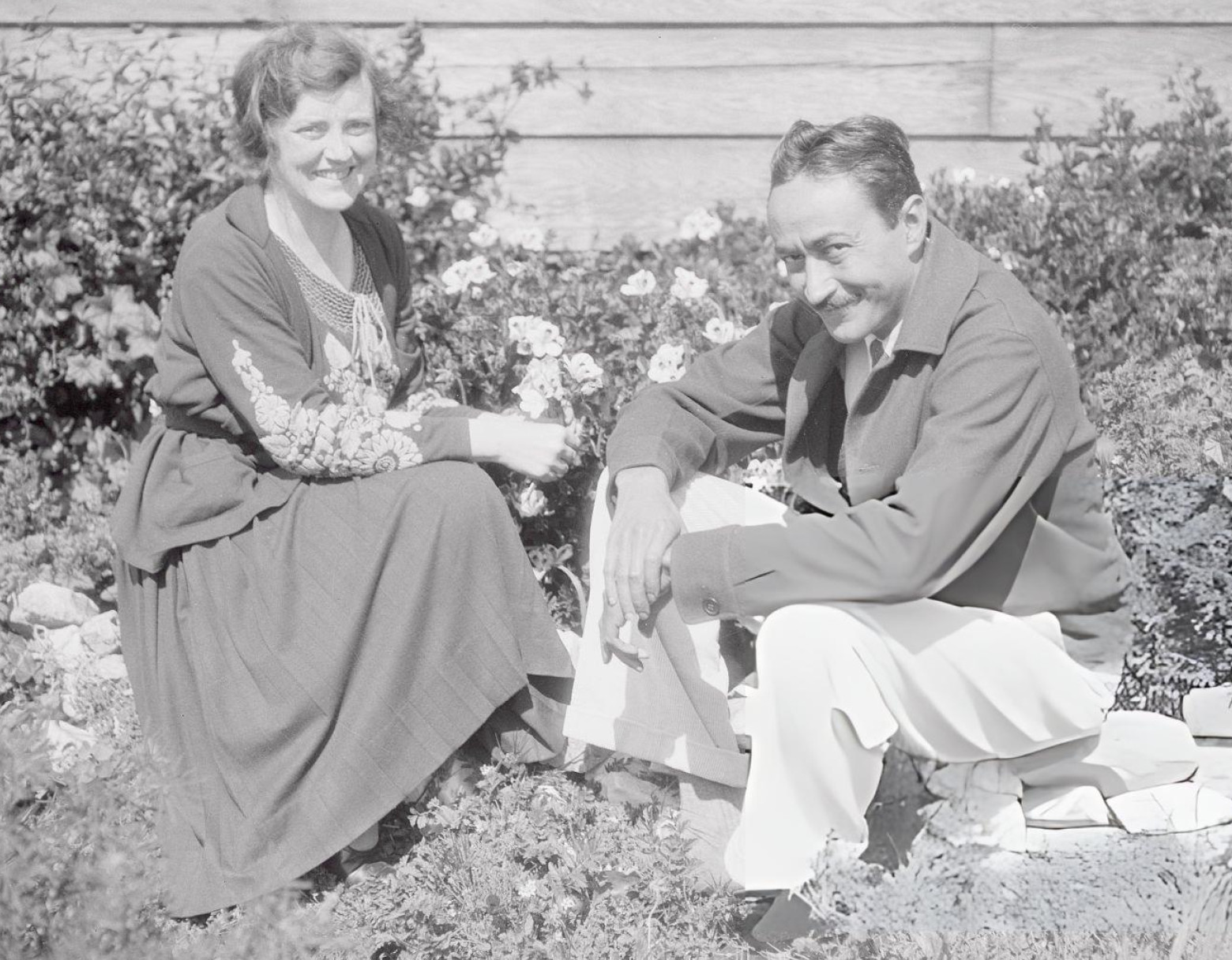
Toomer and Margery Latimer in 1932

In 1931, Toomer married writer Margery Latimer in Wisconsin. While traveling on the West Coast, their union was covered in sensational terms by a Hearst reporter. An anti-miscegenation scandal broke, incorporating rumors about the commune they had organized earlier that year in Portage, Wisconsin. West Coast and Midwest press outlets were aroused and Time magazine sent a reporter to interview them. Toomer was criticized violently by some for marrying a white woman.

Latimer was a respected young writer known for her first two novels and short stories. Diagnosed with a heart leak, she suffered a hemorrhage and died during childbirth in August 1932, when their first child was born. Toomer named their only daughter Margery in his wife's memory.

In 1934, the widowed Toomer married a second time, to Marjorie Content, a New York photographer. She was the daughter of Harry and Ada Content, a wealthy German-Jewish family. Her father was a successful stockbroker. Marjorie Content had been married and divorced three times. Because Toomer was a noted writer and Content was white, this marriage also attracted notice.

In 1940, the Toomers moved to Doylestown, Pennsylvania. There, he formally joined the Quakers and began to withdraw from society. Toomer wrote extensively from 1935 to 1940 about relationships between the genders, influenced by his Gurdjieff studies, as well as Jungian psychology. He had fundamentally traditional views about men and women, which he put in symbolic terms.

In 1939, Toomer changed his name again, using "Nathan Jean Toomer", to emphasize that he was male. He may also have been reaching toward his paternal ancestry by this action. He usually signed his name N. Jean Toomer, and continued to be called "Jean" by friends.

== Racial identity ==
Like some others of African-American parentage, Toomer was probably majority white-European in ancestry, and his appearance was considered "racially indeterminate". As noted above, he lived in both black and white societies as he was growing up and during his adult life, and appears to have not wanted to be bound by race, instead identifying as an "American" representative of a "new race":

"I wrote a poem called, "The First American," the idea of which was, that here in America we are in [the] process of forming a new race, that I was one of the first conscious members of this race."

He resisted being classified as a "Negro writer", but his most enduring work, Cane was inspired by his time in the rural, African-American South, being an imaginative exploration of the African-American world inspired by that heritage. This, itself, may have been part of the issue when it came to his identity — as Larson puts it: "In Cane, Toomer had reached out and attempted to embrace his darkness, but what he had caught within his arms was the fear that if he continued to identify himself as a black man his life would always bear the stigma of restriction. Instead of expanding his perspective, blackness, he feared, would limit it. He had glimpsed the marketplace for the black writer and, in Nellie Y. McKay's words, realized that "it was offered to him on the basis of his 'Negro' blood." What he wanted was something larger, bigger, wider: completeness."

In preparing a new edition of that work, scholars Henry Louis Gates Jr. and Rudolph P. Byrd said in 2010 that, based on their research, they believe that Toomer passed for white at periods in his life. They note that he was classified as white in the 1920 and 1930 censuses (at that time, such data was provided by the census taker, often based on an individual's appearance, economic class, area of residence, neighbors, etc.). Toomer twice had been classified (or registered) as "Negro", in draft registrations: in 1917 and, later, in 1942. When Toomer married Margery Latimer, a white woman, in Wisconsin in 1931, the license noted both as white. "If people didn’t ask," said William Andrews, "I expect he didn’t tell."

Toomer's ambivalence toward racial identification corresponds to his interest in Quaker philosophy. In his early twenties, he attended meetings of the Religious Society of Friends in Doylestown, a Quaker group. Later, he joined a meeting group there.

Quakerism connects groups of different believers under the respect for everyone's belief of a creed. They encourage each other to be able to understand themselves and their own personalities. Jean Toomer's Quaker belief connects to his writings on the place of the African American in the 20th century. He also wrote essays on George Fox and Quakerism. In his essay, “The Negro Emergent,” Toomer describes how African Americans were able to rise from those past identifications in which they were portrayed only as slaves. He said that they were working to find a voice for themselves.

== Legacy and archives ==
- Toomer's papers and unpublished manuscripts are held by the Beinecke Library at Yale University.
- When Cane was reprinted in 1969, it was favorably reviewed as a "Black Classic", leading to a revival of interest in Toomer's work.
- Since the late 20th century, collections of Toomer's poetry and essays have been published, and his Essentials was republished, originally self-published in 1931. It included "Gurdjieffian aphorisms".
- In 2002, Toomer was elected to the Georgia Writers Hall of Fame.

== Books by Toomer ==
- Toomer, Jean; Turner, Darwin T. (1993) [1923]. Cane. New York: Liveright. ISBN 0-87140-151-7.
- Ellsworth Huntington; Whiting Williams; Jean Toomer; Charlotte Perkins Gilman; Thomas Dawes Eliot (1929). Problems of Civilization. New York: D. Van Nostrand Co.
- Toomer, Jean (1931). Essentials: Definitions and Aphorisms (PDF). Chicago: Lakeside Press.
- Toomer, N. Jean (1947). An Interpretation of Friends Worship. Philadelphia: Committee on Religious Education of Friends General Conference.
- Toomer, Jean (1949). The Flavor of Man. Philadelphia: Young Friends Movement of the Philadelphia Yearly Meeting.
- Turner, Darwin T., ed. (1980). The Wayward and the Seeking: A Collection of Writings by Jean Toomer. Howard University Press. ISBN 9780882580142.
- Jones, Robert B; Latimer, Margery Toomer, eds. (1988). The Collected Poems of Jean Toomer. Chapel Hill: University of North Carolina Press. ISBN 0-8078-4209-5.
- Whalan, Mark, ed. (2006). The Letters of Jean Toomer, 1919–1924. University of Tennessee Press. ISBN 9781572334700.

== See also ==
- List of African American writers
- Literature of Georgia (U.S. state)
