= Randolph Bourne =

American writer and intellectual (1886–1918)

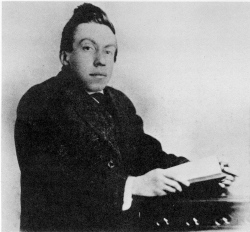
- Born: Randolph Silliman Bourne; May 30, 1886; Bloomfield, New Jersey, US
- Died: December 22, 1918 (aged 32); New York City, US
- Education: Columbia University
- Occupation: Writer

Randolph Silliman Bourne (/bɔːrn/; May 30, 1886 – December 22, 1918) was a progressive writer and intellectual born in Bloomfield, New Jersey, and a graduate of Columbia University. He is considered to be a spokesman for the young radicals living during World War I. His articles appeared in journals including The Seven Arts and The New Republic. Bourne is best known for his essays, especially his unfinished The State, which was discovered after he died and published posthumously in the 1919 collection Untimely Papers. It includes his famous dictum war is essentially the health of the state, which laments the success of governments in arrogating authority and resources during conflicts.

== Early life ==
Vaughan (1997) observed: "Born on May 30, 1886, in Bloomfield, New Jersey, to a family of solid bourgeois credentials, he was the first son of Sarah Barrett and Charles Rogers Bourne. Vaughan (1997) documented: "His mother's lineage was 'relentlessly aristocratic,' .... His father's ancestors came from upstate New York, of predominantly Protestant clergymen and teachers." Bourne's face was deformed at birth by misused forceps and the umbilical cord was coiled round his left ear, leaving it permanently damaged and misshapen. At the age of four, he suffered tuberculosis of the spine, which resulted in his stunted growth and a hunched back. He chronicled his experiences in his essay titled, The Handicapped - by one of them, which is considered a foundational work in disability studies.

Clayton (1988) described Bourne's father as a "mediocre salesman" and that "his business failures grew common." Abrahams (1986) observed that Bourne's mother "was a religious woman and a member of the local Presbyterian Church" and that "she headed the household, which also included another son, Donald, and two younger daughters, Natalie and Ruth." Two different accounts exist about the failure of the marriage. Abrahams (1986) described Bourne's mother as a "wilful woman [who] forced her husband to leave home for good when his business failed and he began to drink heavily." In contrast, Clayton (1988) recounted "Charles's drinking was worse, and the Barretts issued a command: Charles must go. Uncle Halsey would support them." Sherman (1966) similarly recounted that the brother-in-law of Bourne's father agreed to support the family on condition that he left home.

== Education ==
Clayton (1988) described Bourne as being "an excellent, dutiful student, first in the primary school and then at Bloomfield High School." He continued: "He made high marks in algebra, geometry, American history, music and Latin, with lower marks in French and German. ... Latin was the core of the curriculum and his highest marks were in Cicero's orations and Virgil's Aeneid." He was the editor of the school newspaper and he was elected class president. And in 1903 he was admitted to Princeton University. However, his uncle was unwilling to finance his education. Instead, he 'made it clear that Bourne should earn a living in a trade or industry and support his mother.' Consequently Bourne 'spent the next in frustrating and mostly futile efforts to find employment.' He then worked in an office, as an accompanist and as a teacher.

In 1909, and at the age of 23, Bourne won a scholarship to study at Columbia University, "a great metropolitan university and headquarters of modern thought" in which "he found a spiritual home". There he abandoned literary studies for what he called the "intellectual arena" of the social sciences. He participated in the student Intercollegiate Socialist Society, joined the Philolexian Society, and wrote a prize-winning essay, The Doctrine of the Rights of Man as Formulated by Thomas Paine. Bourne graduated in 1912 with a Bachelor of Arts degree and as a holder of the university's Gilder Fellowship, which enabled him to spend a year's independent study in Europe. Then, with the support of Ellery Sedgwick, the editor of the Atlantic Monthly, in 1913 he had his first book published, Youth and Life, a collection of his articles which had been published in the Atlantic Monthly and Columbia Monthly. In the same year he obtained a Master's degree. He went to Western Europe under the auspices of the Gilder Fellowship, during which he spent an extended length of time in London and Paris. And he went as a delegate to the planned international conference of the Intercollegiate Socialist Society which was due to be held in Vienna. However, in August 1914 war broke out. Consequently, the conference was cancelled and he had to return to the United States.

== Career ==
Back in New York, Bourne became the contributing editor of The New Republic, for which he wrote articles which amounted to 30,000 words. In 1915 the government held preparedness talks about a potential declaration of war. The New Republic unequivocably supported them. However, Bourne objected to them, because of which his status became precarious. Consequently he turned to other publications, The Masses, The Dial, Seven Arts and The Atlantic Monthly as outlets for his articles.

World War I divided American progressives and pitted an anti-war faction - including Bourne and Jane Addams - against a pro-war faction led by pragmatist philosopher and educational theorist John Dewey. Bourne was a student of Dewey's at Columbia. However, he rejected Dewey's idea of using the war to spread democracy. He was a member of the Boar's Head Society. In his pointedly titled 1917 essay Twilight of Idols, he invoked the progressive pragmatism of Dewey's contemporary William James to argue that America was using democracy as an end to justify the war, but that democracy itself was never examined. Although he initially followed Dewey, he felt that Dewey had betrayed his democratic ideals by focusing only on the facade of a democratic government rather than on the ideas behind democracy that Dewey had once professed to respect.

Bourne was greatly influenced by Horace Kallen's 1915 essay, Democracy Versus the Melting-Pot. Like Kallen, Bourne argued that Americanism ought not to be associated with Anglo-Saxonism. In his 1916 article Trans-National America Bourne argued that the United States should accommodate immigrant cultures into a cosmopolitan America instead of forcing immigrants to assimilate to the dominant Anglo-Saxon-based culture.

Bourne was an enthusiast for Jean-Jacques Rousseau's belief in the necessity of a general will. Bourne exclaimed:

"Yes, that is what I would have felt, done, said! I could not judge him and his work by those standards that the hopelessly moral and complacent English have imposed upon our American mind. It was a sort of moral bath; it cleared up for me a whole new democratic morality, and put the last touch upon the old English way of looking at the world in which I was brought up and which I had such a struggle to get rid of."

During the last two years of his life, Bourne had published The Gary Schools. He died in the Spanish flu pandemic after the war, in 1918. His funeral, in December in New York, was attended by "fifty or more friends and admirers". Seven of his essays were published in 1919 under the title Untimely Papers. Oppenheim (1919) commented:

"We have nothing else like this book in America. It is the only living record of the suppressed minority, and is, as so often the case, the prophecy of that minority's final triumph. Everything that Bourne wrote over two years ago has been vindicated by the event. A great chorus takes up now the song of this solitary, and like so many pioneers he has not lived to see his truth made into fact."

John Dos Passos, an influential American modernist writer, eulogized Bourne in the chapter Randolph Bourne in his novel U.S.A. and drew heavily on his war is essentially the health of the state dictum.

== Trans-National America ==
In his article, Bourne rejected the melting-pot theory and did not see immigrants assimilating easily to another culture. Bourne's view of nationality was related to the connection between a person and their "spiritual country", that is, their culture. He argued that people would most often hold tightly to the literature and culture of their native country even if they lived in another. He also believed this was true for the many immigrants to the United States. Therefore, Bourne could not see immigrants from all different parts of the world assimilating to the Anglo-Saxon traditions, which were viewed as American traditions.

The article goes on to say that America offers a unique liberty of opportunity and can still offer traditional isolation, which Bourne felt could lead to a cosmopolitan enterprise. He felt that with this great mix of cultures and people, America would be able to grow into a trans-national nation, which would have interconnecting cultural fibers with other countries. Bourne felt America would grow more as a country by broadening people's views to include immigrants' ways instead of conforming everyone to the melting-pot ideal. This broadening of people's views would eventually lead to a nation where all who live in it are united, which would inevitably pull the country towards greatness. This article and most of the ideas in it were influenced by World War I, during which the article was written.
