= Horses and Men =

Short stories collection by Sherwood Anderson

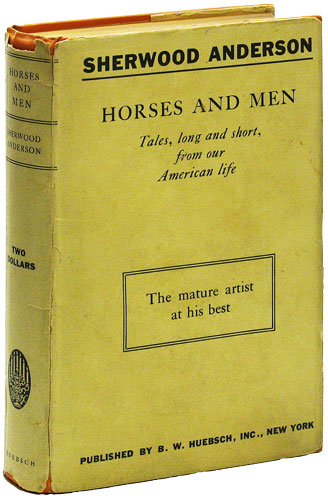
1st edition cover Horses and Men

Horses and Men (full title: Horses and Men: Tales, long and short, from our American life) is a 1923 short story collection by the American author Sherwood Anderson. It was Anderson's fourth book to be published by B.W. Huebsch and his third collection after the successful short story cycle Winesburg, Ohio. The book was dedicated to writer Theodore Dreiser and included a two-page essay about him titled "Dreiser" in addition to a foreword and nine stories.

== Composition and publication ==
The beginning of 1923 was a busy time for Sherwood Anderson. With the publication of his novel Many Marriages (1923) in February, the author turned his attention to an autobiographical work slated for publication in Harper's (though the magazine deal didn't pan out, the work eventually became A Story Teller's Story). It was at a pause in that work that he planned to work on the short story collection already bearing the title Horses and Men. In the beginning of April, that pause came and Anderson put aside his manuscript to turn his focus to the collection which he had promised to his publisher by July 1. Anderson's excitement about the stories in Horses and Men and his comfortable surroundings in a small Reno, Nevada cottage where he was accompanied by his soon-to-be wife, Elizabeth Prall, pushed him to work quickly so the completed manuscript was posted to Ben Huebsch on 16 May 1923.

The months between May and October 1923 found Anderson back to work on Story Teller's Story (then tentatively titled "Modernist Notebook" or Straws) with brief pauses on 19 July and early August to read the proofs for Horses and Men. In multiple letters also sent during that time, Anderson and Huebsch discussed the order of the stories, the book's design, and Huebsch's editing (which was largely hands-off except the normalization grammar and spelling). Originally, it was decided that the design of Horses and Men would resemble Winesburg, Ohio, however the newer book's significantly greater length forced a compromise in which the publisher maintained the earlier book's cover and dust jacket characteristics while adding more words per page in the body of the book. Another compromise was the omission of Anderson's story "There She is -- She is Taking Her Bath" which was scheduled to appear in Pictorial Review in November 1923. Rather than delay publication of the entire collection for the sake of the one story, a decision was made to cut it (the story later appeared in Death in the Woods (1933)). Horses and Men was released on 26 October 1923, selling for $2.00 a copy.

Upon opening the book, readers would see that out of the nine stories and short essay on Dreiser, six were variations of previously published pieces. "Dreiser" was the earliest to be published, appearing in the April 1916 issue of The Little Review. Two of the stories, "I'm a Fool" and "The Man's Story", were published in The Dial (the former also in London Mercury) in February 1922 and September 1923, respectively, while "The Sad Horn Blowers" made its debut in the February 1923 edition of Harper's. Two of the stories were previously published under different names: "Milk Bottles" as "Why There Must Be a Midwestern Literature" in Vanity Fair (March 1921) and "A Chicago Hamlet" as "Broken" in Century (March 1923). Of the original stories, both "An Ohio Pagan" and "'Unused'" were altered portions of Anderson's unfinished and unpublished novel Ohio Pagans, "The Man Who Became a Woman" was written between November 1922 and April 1923, and "The Triumph of the Modern" was probably penned around mid-August 1922.

== The stories ==
The volume includes the following stories:

- "I'm a Fool"
- "The Triumph of a Modern: or, Send for the Lawyer"
- "Unused"
- "A Chicago Hamlet"
- "The Man Who Became a Woman"
- "Milk Bottles"
- "The Sad Horn Blowers"
- "The Man's Story"
- "An Ohio Pagan"

== Sources ==
- Anderson, Sherwood (February 1923). "The Sad Horn Blowers". Harper's. Pgs. 273-289.
- Anderson, Sherwood (September 1923). "The Man's Story". The Dial 75 (3): 247-264.
- Bassett, John Earl (2005). Sherwood Anderson: An American Career. Plainsboro, NJ: Susquehanna UP. ISBN 1-57591-102-7
- Borus, Daniel (1986). American Literary Publishing Houses, 1900-1980: Trade and Paperback. Ed. Peter Dzwonkoski. Detroit: Gale Research. Retrieved from Literature Resource Center.
- McCullough, Ann Catherine (1979). A history of B. W. Huebsch, publisher. Madison, WI: University of Wisconsin–Madison. OCLC 6405818
- Rideout, Walter (2006). Sherwood Anderson: A Writer in America. Vol. 1. Madison, WI: University of Wisconsin Press. ISBN 9780299215309
