= Marching Men =

Novel by Sherwood Anderson

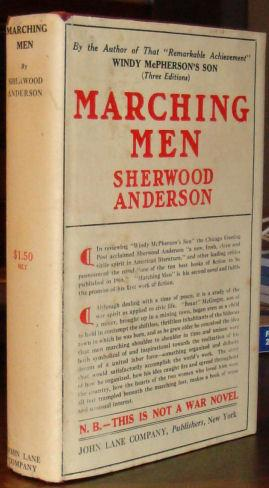
- Marching Men first edition cover
- Author: Sherwood Anderson
- Language: English
- Genre: Novel
- Publisher: John Lane Company, New York
- Publication date: September 1917
- Publication place: United States
- Media type: Print (hardback)
- Pages: 314
- OCLC: 908949

Marching Men is a 1917 novel by American author Sherwood Anderson. Published by John Lane, the novel is Anderson's second book; the first being the 1916 novel Windy McPherson's Son. Marching Men is the story of Norman "Beaut" McGregor, a young man discontented with the powerlessness and lack of personal ambition among the miners of his hometown. After moving to Chicago he discovers his purpose is to empower workers by having them march in unison. Major themes of the novel include the organization of laborers, eradication of disorder, and the role of the exceptional man in society. The latter theme led post-World War II critics to compare Anderson's militaristic approach to homosocial order and the fascists of the War's Axis powers.

Marching Men was written as a hobby project while Sherwood Anderson was still working in advertising. A combination of a small first run, mediocre reviews, and poor sales, convinced Anderson's publisher not to give Marching Men a second run. The novel has since been reprinted several times by other publishers including a 1927 Russian translation, yet is generally forgotten by the reading public except as a step in the development of its author.

== Development history ==
Like Windy McPherson's Son, Sherwood Anderson wrote his second novel while he worked as an advertising copywriter in Elyria, Ohio between 1906 and 1913, several years before he published his first literary writing and a decade before he became an established writer. At least part of Marching Men was written in an attic room of Anderson's Elyria home, which he set up to escape familial demands and focus on writing. Though the author later claimed that he had written his first novels in secret, Anderson's secretary remembers typing the manuscript on company time "around 1911 or 1912".

Inspiration for Marching Men came in part from the author's time as a laborer in Chicago between 1900 and 1906 (where he, like his protagonist, worked in a warehouse, went to night school, was robbed, and fell in love several times) and his service in the Spanish–American War which took place towards the end of the war and just after the armistice in 1898–99. Of the latter, Anderson wrote in his Memoirs about the time he had been marching and got a rock in his shoe. After separating from his fellow soldiers to remove it, he observed them and recalled "I had become a giant. ... I was, in myself, something huge, terrible and at the same time noble. I remember that I sat, for a long time, while the army passed, opening and closing my eyes". Combined with his later reading of works by Thomas Carlyle, Mark Twain, and possibly Jack London, Anderson had inspiration for Marching Men that was both experiential and literary...

== Plot summary ==
=== Books I–II ===
The novel begins with the fourteen-year-old Norman McGregor packaging a loaf of bread for his uncle, the "village wit", – who ironically nicknames him "Beaut" because of his off-putting appearance – in his mother Nance's Coal Creek bakery (bought with the savings of her late husband/Beaut's father "Cracked" McGregor). Not long after, frustrated by the local miners expecting bread on credit without first settling their debts, Beaut closes the bakery during a miner's strike. That evening, as the now-drunk miners move to ransack the bakery (and assault Beaut), he is saved by a troupe of soldiers marching in formation. After the episode, the bakery remains closed and Nance goes to work at the mining office while Beaut idles about. When Beaut is 18 years old, his mother becomes too ill to work and the young man gets a job as a stableboy. One day, as a prank, his fellow stableboys get Beaut (a teetotaler up to that point) blind drunk with a "horrible mess" made just for that purpose. Having reached a breaking point, Beaut takes the rest of his father's savings and leaves Coal Creek for Chicago on the same evening. He arrives in the City just after the 1893 World's Fair. Despite a shortage of jobs, McGregor easily finds a warehouse job and settles into a routine of work during the day and night school/independent reading at night. One day, in a break from the ordinary, the usually unsocial McGregor gives in to the urging of his neighbor Frank Turner, a barber and amateur violin-maker, and goes to a dance. Despite his aloofness, McGregor meets Edith Carson, a frail, mousy, and somewhat homely milliner/shop owner, with whom he develops a platonic relationship.

=== Books III–IV ===
Book III begins with Beaut returning to Coal Creek for his mother's funeral. During the funeral procession, the miners who attend fall spontaneously into step and Beaut is once-again inspired by the power of marching men. Back in Chicago, Edith Carson, who had gained a modicum of wealth through her shrewd business dealings, loans McGregor the money necessary for him to quit working full-time and attend school to become a lawyer, his long-time ambition. Not long after McGregor is admitted to the bar, the son of a wealthy industrialist is found murdered. In order to quell newspaper speculation as to their involvement, the political bosses decide to redirect the media's attention by framing and demonizing small-time thief Andy Brown, an acquaintance of McGregor. From jail, Brown requests that McGregor act as his lawyer. Though McGregor refuses at first, he ends up with the job. After an unsuccessful solo investigation, McGregor turns to wealthy heiress-turned-settlement house-volunteer, Margaret Ormsby, for help. Margaret, a "new woman" who dresses fashionably, is self-assured in demeanor, and is capable of acting independently is bothered by McGregor's bluntness, but decides to aid him nevertheless. On a tip from Edith Carson, and with Ormsby's connections, McGregor is able to clear Andy Brown of any wrongdoing. In the interim, Margaret Ormsby and McGregor develop a romance.

=== Books V–VII ===
While McGregor is slowly building up his idea of marching men (his law practice on the backburner), he decides that he wants to marry Margaret Ormsby. As he is leaving a formal party at her family's mansion, McGregor asks Margaret to marry him, but gets nervous and flees before she can respond. A few weeks later, McGregor falls asleep at the house of Edith Carson and wakes up with her stroking his hair. Realizing that their relationship is more intimate then he had thought, he goes to Margaret and reveals his past experiences with women. Margaret hears McGregor's confession and declares that she will still marry him, but first, she must go talk to Edith. A few weeks later, when McGregor is in the neighborhood for a teamster's strike, he finds that Edith's shop had recently come under new ownership. Rushing to the train station, he finds Edith about to depart. Together, they go to the Ormsby house and in a confrontation Margaret cedes her claim over McGregor to Edith. As Edith and McGregor are leaving, Margaret's father, David, leader of a plow trust (nicknamed "Ormsby the Prince" by the city's oligarchs), extends a hand to McGregor. The two men shake, the narrator noting their polite antagonism towards each other.

Soon, the marching men idea blooms with workers coming together and marching to and from work in the evenings. Becoming nervous over newspaper reports and rumors of the worker gatherings, several "men of affairs" discuss the matter. David Ormsby volunteers to dissuade to McGregor from further organizing but cannot communicate his point to the impassive McGregor. The marching men movement peaks during a demonstration on Labor Day, climaxing with a speech by McGregor. Riding in a carriage with her father at the fringe of the demonstration, Margaret Ormsby is overcome by McGregor's oration, but later professes her allegiance to her father. The book ends that same night with a solitary David Ormsby, a foil to the stereotype of the ruthless businessman, at his window overlooking the city, meditating on his life choices: "What if McGregor and his woman knew both roads? What if they, after looking deliberately along the road toward beauty and success in life, went, without regret, along the road to failure? What if McGregor and not myself knew the road to beauty?"

== Themes ==
=== Unity of workers ===
As with Anderson's novels Poor White (1920) and Beyond Desire (1932), class struggle is a major theme in Marching Men. In addition to it being dedicated "To American Workingmen", one critic placed Marching Men as part of a "proletarian trend" alongside Ernst Toller's play Man and the Masses (1920). Another critic noted the novel's plot shows "... the inexorable clicking-into-place of a process of dialectic. It is Marxist reasoning, and imposes a vision of historical necessity upon its time".

From the beginning of the novel, the narrator, and by extension McGregor, treats disorganized workers with scorn; from the miners of Coal Creek, to the downtrodden laborers of Chicago who are shown mastered by their bosses (unlike McGregor, who does not follow this trend). It is when McGregor comes back to Coal Creek to bury his mother and sees the usually jumbled miners marching in step as part of the funeral procession does he have an epiphany that together the workers are a powerful force, to be organized specifically by him. Indeed, this realization is foreshadowed in Chapter 3 of Book I when as a young man he sees a troupe of marching soldiers disperse a rowdy mob of miner's (and, as a consequence, save his family's bakery) during a strike.

Towards the end of the novel, the heretofore nascent power of the marching workers organized by McGregor is affirmed when the city's oligarchs deem it necessary to act against it. Though opposed to the oligarchs and their brand of ruthless capitalism, McGregor also rejects socialism, opting instead to act within the system as an individual with a "... moral acknowledgement of social responsibility".

=== Order versus disorder ===
"The very soul of the Marching Men was a sense of order. That was the message of it, the thing that the world hasn't come up to yet. Men haven't learned that we must understand the impulse toward order, have that burned onto our consciousness, before we move on to other things."
—Sherwood Anderson, Marching Men

In line with the McGregor's ideal of unified workers was a "quest" to make order from the chaos around him. Throughout Marching Men distinctions between order and disorder are put forward both as ruminations of the narrator and as elements of the plot. Examples of comparisons in the plot begin early on when miners in disarray are compared with organized soldiers. Later, an unbridled Chicago is contrasted with McGregor's orderly routine. Finally, the frustrated mass of job-seekers McGregor encounters upon his arrival to the city is seen against the neat groups of marching men that excite a young reporter in Book VI. Beyond plot points, phrases such as "In the heart of all men lies sleeping the love of order ..." and speaking of McGregor, "His body shook with the strength of his desire to end the vast disorder of life", among others also work to set up the dichotomy of order and chaos.

Despite the repetition of this theme in the text, there is some discussion about its pervading influence. It is ironic, critic Clarence B. Lindsay posits, that while McGregor is busy organizing the marching men, he (as opposed to the narrator) all but ignores the chaos in the city he is constantly traversing. On a larger scale, it is difficult to know whether Sherwood Anderson takes seriously the nostalgic notion of Civil War soldiers marching together as an inspiration for the McGregor's "aesthetic of power" or whether the exaggerated traits of McGregor are, in fact, ironic representations of the benefits of order. This view is furthered by Mark Whalan who likened Anderson's "imposition of order by masculine force" to the "masculine misogyny" of the Italian Futurists many of whom, unlike Anderson (who did not actually see combat during his military service), moved away from their glorification of violence after experiencing World War I.

=== The exceptional man ===
From the book's opening chapter, the narrator of Marching Men portrayed McGregor as separate from those around him. Over the course of the novel McGregor is compared several times to "certain men, all soldiers or leaders of soldiers ..." that he reads about such as Nero and Napoleon. In fact, Anderson elevates his protagonist to the level of the "Emersonian Great Man or Nietzschean Supermen ... " making him the dream-object of women and envy of men from Coal Creek to Chicago. His size and strength, which is noted even during his teenage years is later joined by brains when he completes night school and becomes a lawyer.

To some critics McGregor's exceptionalism helps Marching Men read as a proletarian novel, while others see in it an antecedent to the grotesqueness of the characters in Anderson's 1919 short story cycle, Winesburg, Ohio. To biographer John Earl Bassett, McGregor represents, in part, the author's disdain and fear for parts of modern American life, "... that America will breed Beaut McGregors—talented, charismatic, romantic, cruel—who will use their powers to achieve frightening goals". Combining the ideas of an exceptional leader and unified workers has raised questions among critics concerning the parallels between the "militaristic impulse" in Marching Men and the fascism of the WWII-era, a charge Anderson acknowledged in his posthumously published Memoirs.

== Literary significance and criticism ==
Upon publication, reviews of Marching Men were moderate with a small number of reviewers taking strong negative stances. In one such review, an anonymous critic from the New York Times Book Review noted that the beginning of the novel was "sufficiently well done to lead the reader to expect a novel of possibly a trifle more than average interest and average merit" but ultimately concludes that neither McGregor, "nor the book ever seems to get anywhere in particular". Other reviewers too did not hesitate to mention the novel's stunted character development and anticlimactic ending. Aside from these faults, several critics also commented on Marching Men's "deliberate vagueness", calling the book a "generous if misty vision of the future".

Despite the book's deficiencies, reviewers were practically unanimous in praising the realistic description and mood of Anderson's settings from Coal Creek to Chicago. Within these settings, McGregor's scheme was acknowledged by the even-tempered New York Tribune reviewer as a "clever and original idea". Others, like editor Francis Hackett wrote "Where Marching Men succeeds is in thrusting the greater American realities before us ..." to which critic George Bernard Donlin, in his Dial review, adds "Mr. Anderson's book interested me chiefly as the expression of a vigorous and sincere mind ...".

Written almost a decade before Sherwood Anderson established himself as a writer with the release of his 1919 short story cycle, Winesburg, Ohio, Marching Men is generally considered, along with Windy McPherson's Sons and two other unpublished novels, as one of Anderson's "apprentice novels". Viewed in hindsight, the shiftless plot and weak ending of Marching Men can be seen as a precursor to similar criticism in Anderson's later novels.

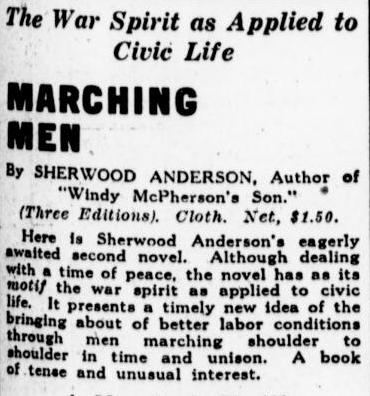
Advertisement for Marching Men in the Philadelphia Evening Public Ledger (15 September 1917)

== Publication history ==
Marching Men was the second book of Anderson's three-book contract with the publisher John Lane (the first being Windy McPherson's Son (1916) and the third being Mid-American Chants, published in 1918). A first edition of 2,500 copies was printed, but poor sales (around 1,000 copies) kept the novel from being reprinted until B.W. Huebsch picked it up in 1921 following Anderson's success with Winesburg, Ohio, novel Poor White, and short story collection The Triumph of an Egg. In 1972, the Press of Case Western Reserve University put out a critical edition of Marching Men with an introduction by noted Sherwood Anderson scholar Ray Lewis White which used as its basis Anderson's early manuscripts in addition to the John Lane/B.W. Huebsch version. A Russian edition of Marching Men was published as V Nogu! (loosely translated, "In Step") (Leningrad: Mysl, 1927).

== Sources ==
- Anderson, Sherwood (1969). Sherwood Anderson's Memoirs. White, Ray Lewis (ed). Chapel Hill, NC: North Carolina UP. OCLC 16163
- Anderson, Sherwood (1972). Marching Men. White, Ray Lewis (ed). Cleveland, OH: Case Western Reserve University. ISBN 0-8295-0216-5
- Anonymous "For the People". Nation 105 (11 October 1917): 403–404.
- Anonymous "Marching Men". New York Times Book Review (28 October 1917): 442.
- Anonymous "Dignifying Labor". New York Tribune (27 October 1917): 9.
- Bassett, John Earl (2005). Sherwood Anderson: An American Career. Plainsboro, NJ: Susquehanna UP. ISBN 1-57591-102-7
- Boynton, H.W. "A Stroll Through the Fair of Fiction". Bookman 46 (November 1917): 337–342.
- Burbank, Rex (1966) "The Populist Temper". in White, Ray Lewis (ed). The Achievement of Sherwood Anderson: Essays in Criticism. Chapel Hill, NC: University of North Carolina. OCLC 276748
- Calverton, V.F. (1929). "The Sociological Aesthetics of the Bolsheviki". The American Journal of Sociology 35(3): 383–392.
- Ditsky, John. "Sherwood Anderson's Marching Men: Unnatural Disorder and the Art of Force". Twentieth Century Literature 23(1): 102–114.
- Donlin, George Bernard. "Discipline". Dial 63 (27 September 1917): 274–275.
- Dunne, Robert (2001) "Sherwood Anderson". in Dictionary of Midwestern Literature, Vol. 1 (The Authors) edited by Phillip A. Greasley. Indiana UP. ISBN 978-0-253-33609-5
- Dunne, Robert (2005). A New Book of the Grotesques: Contemporary Approaches to Sherwood Anderson's Early Fiction. Kent, OH: Kent State UP. ISBN 978-0-87338-827-6
- Hackett, Francis (1918) "To American Workingmen". in Horizons: A Book of Criticism. New York: B. W. Huebsch: 57–61.
- Howe, Irving (1951). Sherwood Anderson. New York: William Sloane Associates.
- Lindsay, Clarence B. (1995) "The Unrealized City in Sherwood Anderson's Windy McPherson's Son and Marching Men." Midwestern Miscellany 23: 17–27.
- Smith, Howard (1959). "The American Businessman in the American Novel". Southern Economic Journal 25(3): 265–302.
- Webb, Doris. "Labor in Line". Publishers Weekly 92 (20 October 1917): 1372.
- Whalan, Mark (2007). Race, Manhood, and Modernism in America: The Short Story Cycles of Sherwood Anderson and Jean Toomer. Knoxville, TN: Tennessee UP. ISBN 978-1-57233-580-6
- White, Ray Lewis (1966). "Introduction". in White, Ray Lewis (ed). The Achievement of Sherwood Anderson: Essays in Criticism. Chapel Hill, NC: University of North Carolina. OCLC 276748
- White, Ray Lewis (1972). "Introduction". in White, Ray Lewis (ed). Marching Men. Cleveland, OH: Case Western Reserve University. ISBN 0-8295-0216-5
- White, Ray Lewis (1994). "Introduction". in Anderson, Sherwood. Windy McPherson's Son. Chicago, IL: Illinois UP. ISBN 978-0-252-06357-2
