= Banned in Boston =

Phrase used to describe a work prohibited in Boston

"Banned in Boston" is a phrase that was employed from the late 19th century through the mid-20th century, to describe a literary work, song, motion picture, or play that had been prohibited from distribution or exhibition in Boston, Massachusetts. During this period, Boston officials had wide authority to ban works featuring "objectionable" content, and often banned works with sexual content or foul language. This even extended to the $5 bill from the 1896 "Educational" series of banknotes featuring allegorical figures that were partially nude.

== History ==
Boston was founded in the early 17th century by Puritans, who held strict moral standards. Boston's second major wave of immigrants, Irish Catholics, began arriving in the 1820s and also held conservative moral beliefs, particularly regarding sex.

Early instances of works being "banned in Boston" extend back at least to the year 1651. That year, William Pynchon, the founder of Springfield, Massachusetts—Massachusetts' great settlement in the Connecticut River Valley—and the former treasurer of the Massachusetts Bay Colony, wrote a book criticizing Puritanism entitled The Meritorious Price of Our Redemption. Boston, founded by Puritans and, at that time ruled as a de jure theocracy, banned Pynchon's book and pressed him to return to England. He did so in 1652, which nearly caused Springfield to align with the nearby Connecticut Colony.

This reputation persisted throughout the Puritan era. In 1700 an objection to the religious doctrines of Increase Mather carried with it an advertisement that Boston publishers had refused to print it out of fear of Mather. This advertisement caused such an uproar in Boston that many half-hearted denials by Boston printers were collected and printed by Mather's party.

The phrase "banned in Boston", however, originated in the late 19th century at a time when American moral crusader Anthony Comstock began a campaign to suppress vice. He found widespread support in Boston, particularly among upper-class officials. Comstock was also known as the proponent of the Comstock Act, which prevented obscene materials from being delivered by the U.S. mail.

Following Comstock's lead, Boston's city officials took it upon themselves to ban anything that they found to be salacious, inappropriate, or offensive. Aiding them in their efforts was a group of private citizens, the Boston Watch and Ward Society. Theatrical shows were run out of town, books were confiscated, and motion pictures were prevented from being shown; sometimes movies were stopped mid-showing, after an official had "seen enough". In 1935, for example, during the opening performance of Clifford Odets' play Waiting for Lefty, four cast members were placed under arrest.

This movement had several unintended consequences. One was that Boston, a cultural center since its founding, was perceived as less sophisticated than other cities without stringent censorship practices. Another was that the phrase "banned in Boston" became associated, in the popular mind, with something lurid, sexy, and naughty. Commercial distributors were often pleased when their works were banned in Boston—it gave them more appeal elsewhere. In 1961, singer/host Merv Griffin recorded a novelty song, "Banned in Boston", written by Clint Ballard Jr. and Fred Tobias, which became a modest hit.

Literary figure H. L. Mencken was arrested in Boston in 1926, after purposely selling a banned issue of his magazine The American Mercury. Though his case was dismissed by a local judge and he later won a lawsuit against the Watch and Ward Society for illegal restraint of trade, the effort did little to affect censorship in Boston. Strange Fruit, the novel of forbidden interracial romance by Lillian Smith, was also banned by the Watch and Ward Society, and, in 1929, Boston's mayor Malcolm Nichols and the city censor banned Eugene O'Neill's Pulitzer Prize-winning play Strange Interlude.

During the same era, there were also periodic "purity campaigns" on radio, as individual stations decided to ban songs with double-entendres or alleged vulgar lyrics. One victim of such a campaign was bandleader Joe Rines who, in November 1931, was cut off in mid-song by John L. Clark, program director of WBZ, for performing a number called "This is the Missus", whose lyrics Clark deemed inappropriate. Rines was indignant, saying he believed Clark was over-reacting to a totally innocent song, but Clark insisted he was right to ban any song whose lyrics might be construed as suggestive.

The Warren Court (1953–69) expanded civil liberties and in Memoirs v. Massachusetts and other cases curtailed the ability of municipalities to regulate the content of literature, plays, and movies. The last major literary censorship battle in the U.S. was fought over Naked Lunch, which was banned in Boston in 1965. Eventually the Watch and Ward Society changed its name to the New England Citizens Crime Commission, and made its main emphasis against gambling and drugs and far less on media.

== Works banned ==
- Leaves of Grass by Walt Whitman (1881)
- "$5 'Educational Series' Silver Certificate (1893, issued 1896)
- The Decameron by Giovanni Boccaccio (1894)
- Three Weeks by Elinor Glyn (1909)
- Many Marriages by Sherwood Anderson (1923)
- Antic Hay by Aldous Huxley (1923)
- The American Mercury (magazine, April 1926)
- Desire Under the Elms by Eugene O'Neill (play, 1926)
- Elmer Gantry by Sinclair Lewis (1927)
- An American Tragedy by Theodore Dreiser (1927)
- The Sun Also Rises by Ernest Hemingway (1927)
- Oil! by Upton Sinclair (1927)
- Black April by Julia Peterkin (1927)
- Manhattan Transfer by John Dos Passos (1927)
- Mosquitoes by William Faulkner (1927)
- Nigger Heaven by Carl Van Vechten (1927)
- The World of William Clissold by H. G. Wells (1927)
- Dark Laughter by Sherwood Anderson (1927)
- Strange Interlude by Eugene O'Neill (play, 1929)
- Lady Chatterley's Lover by D. H. Lawrence (1929)
- A Farewell to Arms by Ernest Hemingway (magazine serial, 1929)
- Jews without Money by Michael Gold (1930)
- God's Little Acre by Erskine Caldwell (1933)
- The Children's Hour by Lillian Hellman (play, 1934)
- Within the Gates by Seán O'Casey (play, 1935)
- Waiting for Lefty by Clifford Odets (play, 1935)
- Strange Fruit by Lillian Smith 1944
- Forever Amber by Kathleen Winsor (1944)
- The Moon Is Blue (1953)
- "Wake Up Little Susie" by The Everly Brothers (song, 1957)
- "Beans in My Ears" by the Serendipity Singers (song, 1964)

In four final cases the bans were overturned in court:

- Naked Lunch by William S. Burroughs (1965)
- Fanny Hill by John Cleland (1966)
- I Am Curious (Yellow) by Vilgot Sjöman (1967)
- Caligula by Tinto Brass (1979)

== See also ==
- Streisand effect
- Memoirs v. Massachusetts
