= Ripshin Farm =

Historic house in Virginia, United States

- U.S. National Register of Historic Places
- U.S. National Historic Landmark
- Virginia Landmarks Register
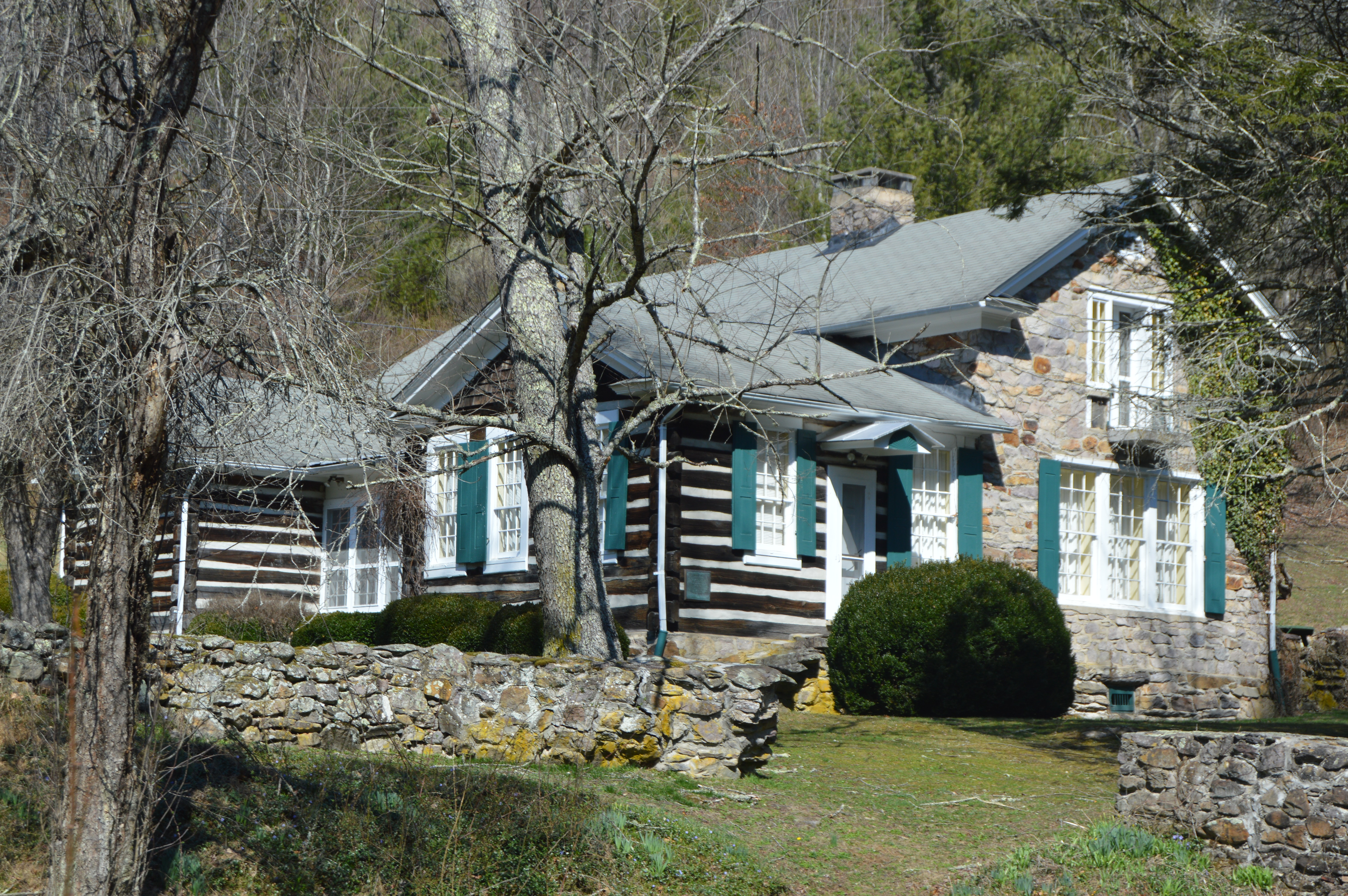
- Front and western side

- Location within Virginia Location within the United States
- Location: Near the junction of Ripshin and Laurel Creek Roads, near Troutdale, Virginia
- Coordinates: 36°41′53″N 81°24′26″W
- Area: 76 acres (31 ha)
- Built: 1925
- Architect: William Spratling
- NRHP reference No.: 71000979
- VLR No.: 038-0008

Significant dates
- Added to NRHP: September 22, 1971
- Designated NHL: November 11, 1971
- Designated VLR: March 2, 1971

Ripshin Farm, also known as the Sherwood Anderson Farm, is a historic farm property at the junction of Routes 603 and 732 near Troutdale, Virginia. It was developed as a summer home and later year-round home by writer Sherwood Anderson (1876–1941), and is where he wrote most of his later works. It was declared a National Historic Landmark in 1971.

== Description and history ==
Ripshin Farm is located in a rural setting in Virginia's southwestern hills, east of the village of Troutdale. It is set on a rise overlooking the confluence of Ripshin and Lauren Creeks, and is accessed by a long drive on the east side of Route 603 north of its junction with Route 732. The property consists of 76 acres (31 ha), much of which is wooded, but with views cleared to the west. It includes the main house, two small guest cottages, and a log cabin in which Anderson did his writing. The main house is 1½ stories in height, with a central section of fieldstone flanked by log wings.

The property was a small farm when Sherwood Anderson purchased it in 1925. He at first lived in a log cabin on the site, while the house was under construction. It would serve as his home and principal writing location until his death in 1941. Anderson was one of the first writers of his time to create candid depictions of the sometimes gritty aspects of life, and for his frankly self-revealing works. He was acknowledged as a major influence on a generation of writers, including William Faulkner, Stephen Vincent Benét, and Eudora Welty. Anderson's only bestseller in his career, Dark Laughter, was completed here in 1925.

== See also ==
- National Register of Historic Places listings in Grayson County, Virginia
- List of National Historic Landmarks in Virginia
