= Marion College =

Marion College may refer to:

- Indiana Wesleyan University, once called Marion College
- Marion College (Missouri), a historical manual work college founded by David Nelson
- Marion College (Virginia), a defunct junior college in Virginia
