= The Triumph of the Egg =

1921 short story collection by Sherwood Anderson

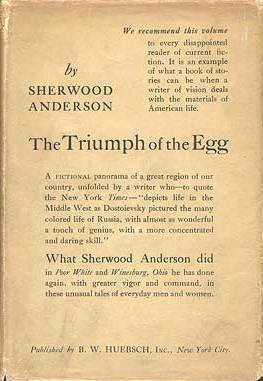
1st edition cover The Triumph of the Egg

The Triumph of the Egg (full title: The Triumph of the Egg: A Book of Impressions from American Life in Tales and Poems) is a 1921 short story collection by the American author Sherwood Anderson. It was Anderson's third book to be published by B.W. Huebsch and his second collection after the successful short story cycle Winesburg, Ohio. The book contains 15 stories preceded by photographs of seven clay sculptures by Anderson's wife at the time, sculptor Tennessee Mitchell, that were inspired by characters in the book. The book was the source of inspiration for a sculpture under the same name in the Smithsonian Museum.

== Contents ==
The volume includes the following stories:

- "The Dumb Man"
- "I Want to Know Why"
- "Seeds"
- "The Other Woman"
- "The Egg"
- "Unlighted Lamps"
- "Senility"
- "The Man in the Brown Coat"
- "Brothers"
- "The Door of the Trap"
- "The New Englander"
- "War"
- "Motherhood"
- "Out of Nowhere Into Nothing"
- "The Man with the Trumpet"
