= Eleanor Gladys Copenhaver =

American social worker and activist

- circa 1930s
- Born: June 15, 1896; Marion, Virginia
- Died: September 12, 1985 (aged 89); Marion, Virginia
- Other names: Eleanor Gladys Copenhaver Anderson, Eleanor Anderson, Eleanor Copenhaver Anderson
- Education: Marion Female College; Westhampton College; Columbia University
- Occupation: social worker
- Years active: 1918–1961
- Known for: YWCA labor executive
- Spouse: Sherwood Anderson (m. 1933)

Eleanor Gladys Copenhaver (also known as Eleanor Copenhaver Anderson) (1896–1985) was a social worker and activist who spent over 40 years as an organizer and community service worker for the YWCA. She began as a community organizer and worked her way up to the labor division, finally becoming head of the Industrial Division from 1937 to 1947. At the end of World War II, when women were phased out of the labor market, she was briefly dismissed, but then hired back to organize support for the communities springing up around the defense industry.

== Biography ==
Eleanor Gladys Copenhaver was born on June 15, 1896, in Marion, Virginia to Laura Lu (née Scherer) and Bascom Eugene Copenhaver. Both of Copenhaver's parents taught at the school her grandfather Scherer had founded, Marion Female College. She spent her childhood at the family home, "Rosemont", which also housed Rosemont Industries, an organization established by her mother, which marketed local handicrafts. After completing her primary education at the public schools of Marion, Copenhaver began her university studies at Marion College before she transferred in 1914 to Westhampton College in Richmond, Virginia. She completed her B.A. in English in 1917 and returned that same year to Marion to teach. In 1918, she enrolled in social work classes at Bryn Mawr College in Pennsylvania and in 1919 worked in a settlement camp for New York City women during the summer. She completed her degree in 1920 earning a certificate in social economy.

== Career ==
In September 1920, Copenhaver became a Field Secretary on the national staff of the YWCA covering the south and central region. From 1920 to 1923 she was a rural community organizer. In addition to introducing the programs of the YWCA to local communities and churches, Copenhaver participated in seminars and retreats like one held in 1922, which explored the tenets of internationalism that had sprung up after the first World War. The YWCA believed that if women used their moral and professional authority, they would reshape the world. Copenhaver participated in the "Conference at the Lake" and after their presentation on relationships with Syrian and Japanese women, and the Bible study, she directed a play, which she had written with her mother. The basic theme was modernity and the enlightenment of women who could draw upon the past, their spirituality and their ability to work and use their intelligence. In 1923 she switched to industrial community activism then in 1925 became the National Industrial Secretary working out of New York. Her political beliefs became increasingly radical during her many visits to factories to counsel and organize working women. During one of these visits in 1928, she made a side trip to her family and met the writer Sherwood Anderson. Coperhaver returned to New York and enrolled in a master's program at Columbia University. She completed the degree in political economy in 1933 and later that same year, married Anderson.

Coperhaver-Anderson continued working as a labor organizer. In 1937, she was promoted to head the Industrial Programs of the YWCA. Her work entailed investigating working and educational conditions, submitting reports for action and providing support for labor unions. She continued to travel with her job and the couple also traveled to visit Sherwood's artist and writer friends all over the world. On one of these trips, taken in 1941 after the death of her mother, the couple were en route to Valparaíso, Chile, aboard the SS Santa Lucia. Sherwood became ill with peritonitis, the couple disembarked, but he died at a hospital in Colón, Panama. After bringing him back to Virginia for burial, Anderson returned to work. She continued as the executive of the Y's industrial division and resumed her travels, going across the country, until the Industrial Department was phased out soon after the end of World War II. When that happened, in 1947, Anderson took a two-year assignment with the international YWCA in Italy to help with relief efforts. At the end of her assignment, she returned from Italy and was terminated by the Y due to their elimination of women's employment programs. She spent most of 1950 organizing Sherwood's papers and preparing them for donation to the Newberry Library in Chicago. The following year, she was rehired by the YWCA working on their United Community Defense Services, which was a program aimed at providing "health, welfare, and recreation services" to communities supporting the defense industry. She remained with the YWCA until her retirement in 1961.

After her retirement, she served as Sherwood's literary executor as well as the overseer of his property at "Ripshin" and her mother's legacy at "Rosemont". Anderson died on September 12, 1985, in Marion, Virginia. Copenhaver's papers are located at Smith College in Northampton, Massachusetts. Many of the records can be found on-line as part of the Five College Finding Aids Access Project, which was funded by the Andrew W. Mellon Foundation.

== Sources ==
- Klotter, James C. (1 January 2005). The Human Tradition in the New South. Lanham, Maryland: Rowman & Littlefield. ISBN 978-0-7425-4476-5.
