= Tar: A Midwest Childhood =

1926 novel by Sherwood Anderson

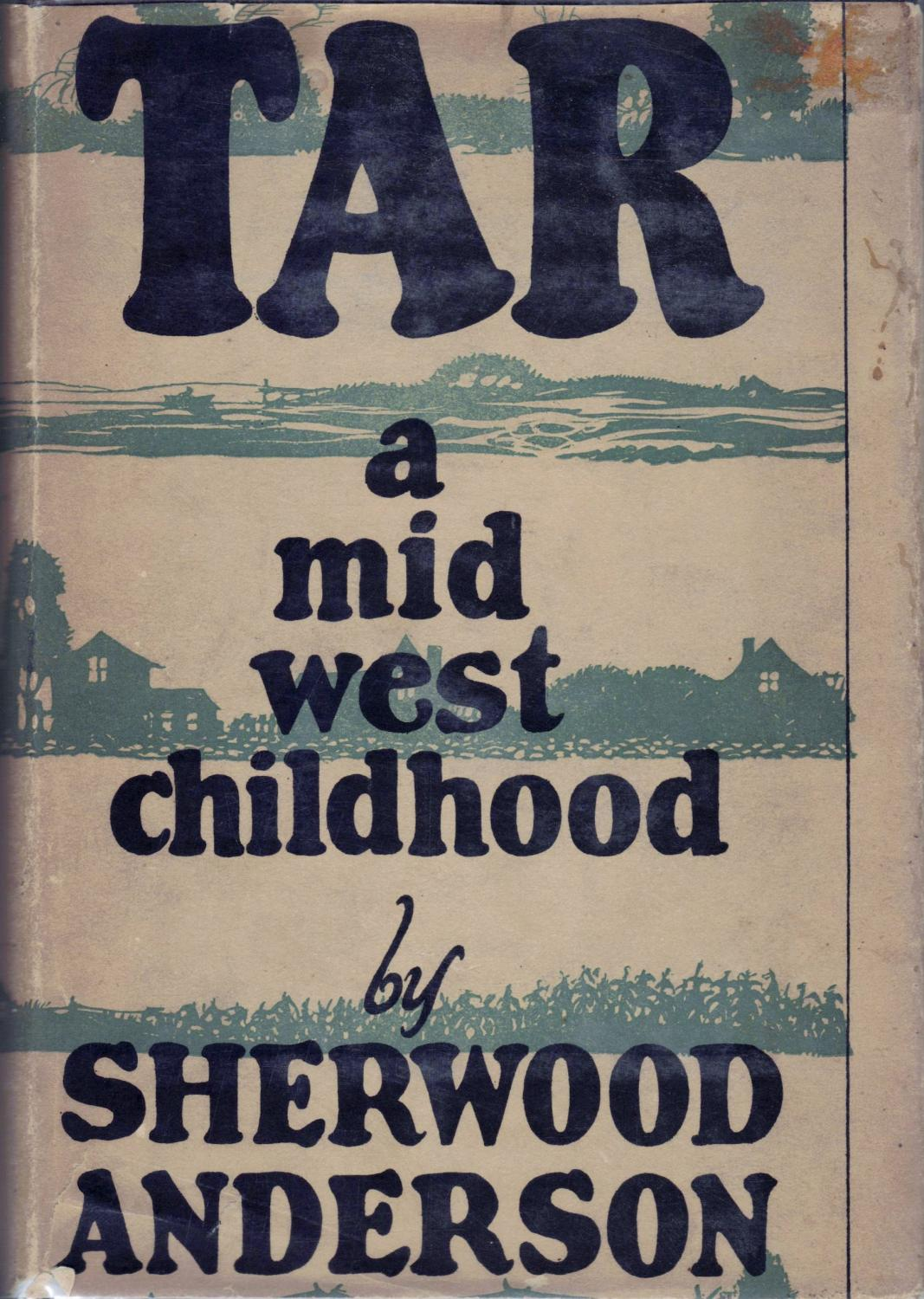
- Author: Sherwood Anderson
- Language: English
- Genre: Novel
- Publisher: Boni & Liveright, New York
- Publication date: November 20, 1926
- Publication place: United States
- Media type: Print (hardback)
- Pages: 346
- OCLC: 276744

Tar: A Midwest Childhood is a 1926 fictionalized memoir by American author Sherwood Anderson. It was originally published by Boni & Liveright and has since been republished several times including a 1969 critical edition. The book is made up of episodes in the childhood of Edgar Moorehead (nicknamed Tar-heel, or Tar, because of his father's North Carolina origin). The fictional location of Tar: A Midwest Childhood bears a resemblance to Camden, Ohio where Sherwood Anderson was born, despite him having spent only his first year there. An episode from the book later appeared, in a revised form, as the short story "Death in the Woods" (1933).

== Composition and publication ==
According to Sherwood Anderson scholar Ray Lewis White, it was 1919 when the author first mentioned in a letter to his publisher at the time, B.W. Huebsch, that he was interested in composing a series of stories based on "...country life at the edge of a middle-western small town." Nothing came of the idea, however, until around February 1925, when the popular monthly magazine The Woman's Home Companion expressed interest. Over that year, including the summer during which Anderson boarded with a family in Troutdale, Virginia and wrote in a log cabin, Tar: A Midwest Childhood was drafted. Though progress on the book was slower than expected over the summer, Anderson reported to his agent Otto Liveright in September 1925, that roughly two-thirds of the book was finished. This was enough that in February 1926, the installments for The Woman's Home Companion were sent off. They were published in the following order:

Story Title	Volume and Publication Date
"Tar Moorhead's Father"	LIII (June, 1926) pgs. 19-20, 154-55
"A Small Boy Looks at His World"	LIII (July, 1926) pgs. 19-20, 42, 45
"Worlds of Fancy and of Facts"	LIII (September, 1926) pgs. 27-28, 79
"Tar's Day of Bravery"	LIII (October, 1926) pgs. 25-26, 184-185
"Tar's Wonderful Sunday"	LIII (November, 1926) pgs. 29-30, 50
"What Makes a Boy Afraid"	LIV (January, 1927) pgs. 19-20, 96

That initial task done, Anderson set to finish the rest of the book, sending the completed manuscript to Boni & Liveright in June or July 1926. By September of that year, proofs mailed to Anderson by his publisher were returned with corrections and, by the beginning of November, bound copies of Tar: A Midwest Childhood were posted to the author. The book was released on November 20, 1926. The book has also been published under the title "A Story Teller's Story, Tar: A Midwest Childhood".

== Sources ==
- Burbank, Rex J. (1964). Twayne's United States Authors Series 65: Sherwood Anderson. New York: Twayne.
- Rideout, Walter B. (2006). Sherwood Anderson: A Writer in America, Volume 1. Madison, WI: University of Wisconsin Press. ISBN 978-0-299-21530-9
- White, Ray Lewis (1969). "Introduction". In Anderson, Sherwood. Tar: A Midwest Childhood. Cleveland, OH: Case Western Reserve University. ISBN 0-8295-0159-2
