= I'm a Fool =

1922 short story by Sherwood Anderson

"I'm a Fool" is a short story by American writer Sherwood Anderson. It was first published in the February 1922 issue of The Dial (followed the next month by the London Mercury), and later, in 1923 as the first story in Anderson's short-story collection Horses and Men. Of that collection, William Faulkner wrote that "...I think, next to Heart of Darkness by Conrad that the first story, 'I'm a Fool,' is the best short story I ever read."

The story is narrated in first person point of view and the setting is Ohio, where Sherwood Anderson was born.

== Adaptations ==
An adaptation of the story was performed by Orson Welles and Nancy Gates on the September 29, 1941, broadcast of CBS Radio's The Orson Welles Show.

James Dean, Natalie Wood and Eddie Albert starred in a live TV play on the series General Electric Theater, hosted by Ronald Reagan.

In 1977, Noel Black made a 38-minute film based on Anderson's story, keeping its title, "I'm a Fool". Released as part of PBS's "Short Story Collection", Ron Howard starred as Andy and Amy Irving played the role of the pretty girl Miss Lucy Wessen.
