= Svendborger Gedichte =

Poetry collection by Bertolt Brecht

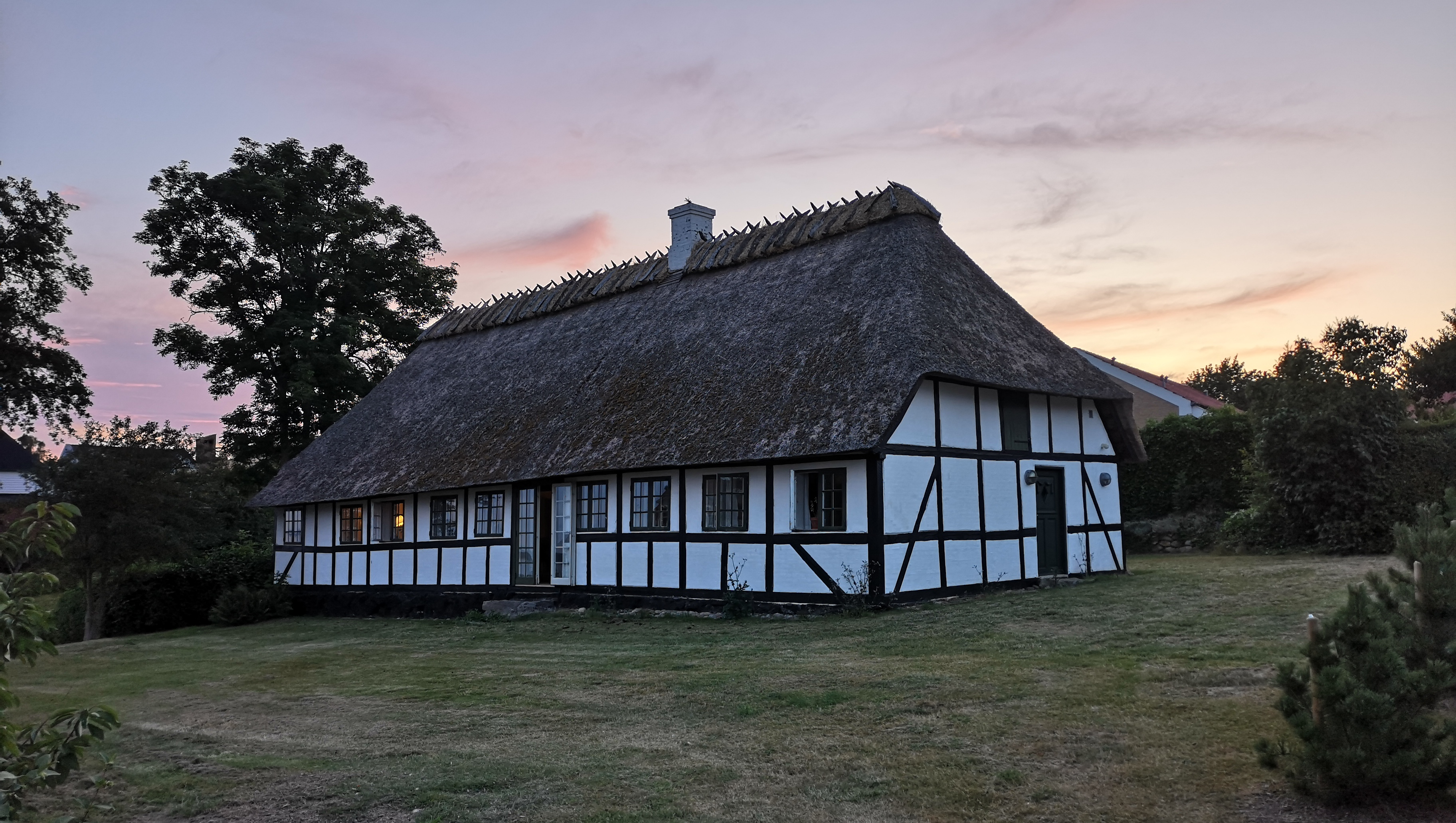
Brechts Hus, Skovsbostrand 8, Svendborg, Denmark. Brecht assembled the Svendborger Gedichte, as the title page says, 'refuged beneath this Danish thatched roof'.

Svendborger Gedichte ('Svendborg Poems') is a poetry collection by the German poet and playwright Bertolt Brecht, and the last collection of new poems to be published while he lived. The collection is named after the town of Svendborg on the Danish island of Funen, where Brecht lived during his exile from Nazi Germany. During this period, Hanns Eisler stayed several times to set a large group of the poems to music in collaboration with Brecht.

== Composition and publication ==
The first major poetry collection that Brecht wrote in exile was Lieder Gedichte Chöre. This was followed by the Svendborger Gedichte in 1939. This compilation was preceded by earlier publications, and individual poems followed, such that one can assume a period of origin from 1926 to 1938. Brecht worked on compiling the collection primarily during the winter of 1937-38 while living at Skovsbostrand outside Svendborg, in collaboration with Margarete Steffin, almost entirely completing the work by 22 July 1938. The title was initially Gedichte im Exil ('Poems in Exile'). The intention was to include the work in volume 4 of the edition of Brecht's work to be published by Wieland Herzfelde's press Malik-Verlag, nominally in London but in practice from Prague. Brecht wrote in May 1938: "you can now give me the decisive position that I have not had in emigrant literature so far. And you can simultaneously put the publisher [Malik] at the forefront."

By March 1939, galley proofs of the whole volume had been sent to Brecht from Prague, with the set type itself being in Prague. But in the wake of the events surrounding the Munich Agreement and the Nazi invasion of Czechoslovakia, Herzfelde had to flee from Prague; the finished set of Svendborg poems was lost. The galley proofs were then passed to Copenhagen, where in May 1939 the Danish printer Universal Trykkeriet printed the Gedichte im Exil section under the new title Svendborger Gedichte, with Herzfelde named as the publisher and London as the place of publication. The volume was billed as an 'advance printing from Brecht: Collected Works, volume 4'. The publication received significant support from Ruth Berlau, the American Guild for German Cultural Freedom, and apparently the Diderot Society (the latter of which Brecht was working to found around 1936).

There are only two copies of the so-called "Prague sequence" known, one of which is in the Brecht Archive, Berlin; the other copy was discovered in 2011 by the Rotes Antiquariat, Berlin, in New York.

The poems that comprised section 3, Chroniken ('chronicles'), were based on stories which Brecht encountered in his reading. For example, "Abbau des Schiffes Oskawa durch die Mannschaft" ("How the Ship 'Oskawa' was Broken up by her own Crew") is a subversive rewriting of an account of life on the ship by Louis Adamic in his 1931 Dynamite: The Story of Class Violence in America, while "Kohlen für Mike" ("Coal for Mike") was based on an incident in Sherwood Anderson's novel Poor White.

== Contents ==
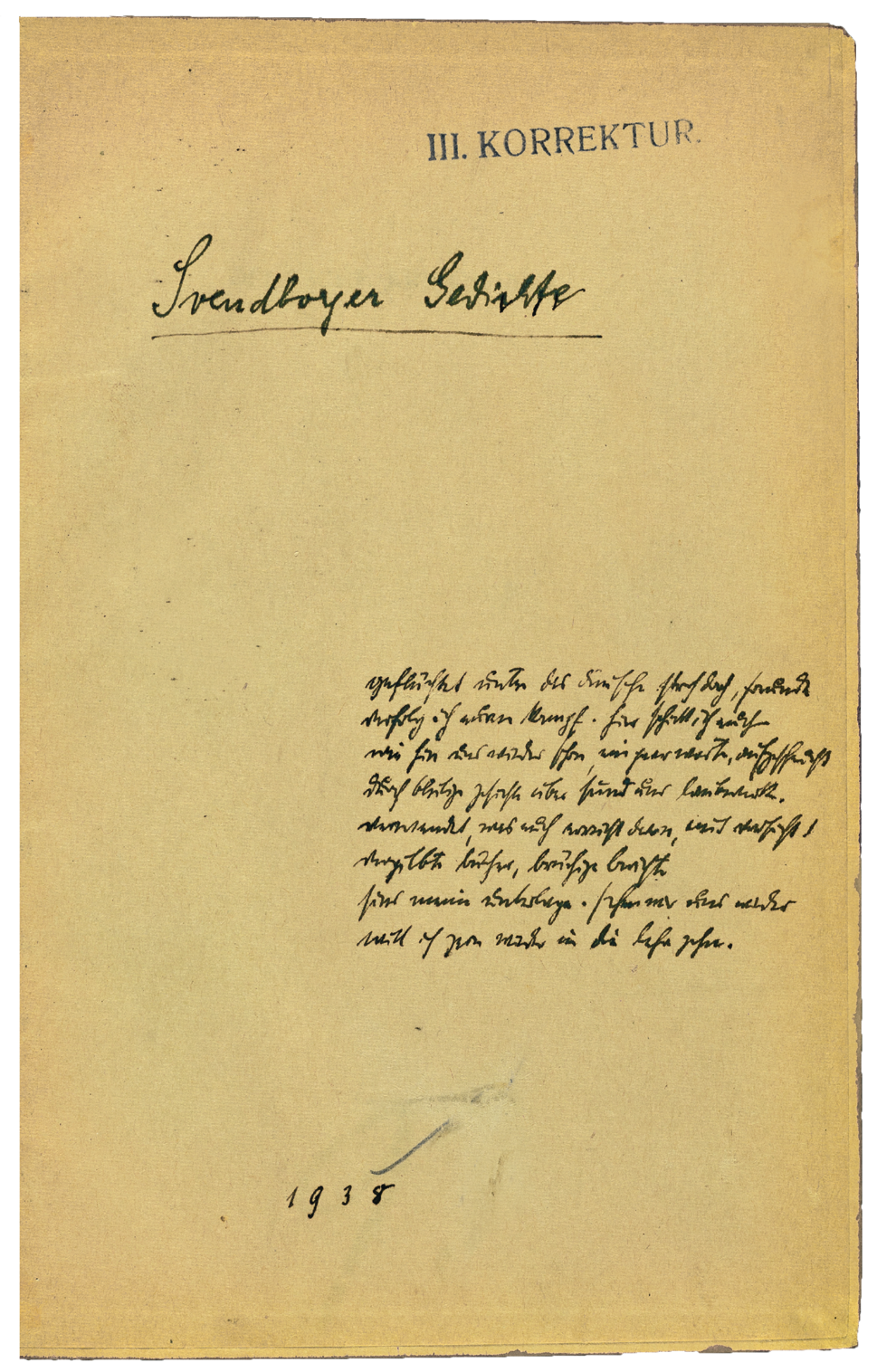
Manuscript of the title page, with motto.

The collection is divided into six sections. It opens with the following 'Motto to the Svendborg Poems' and contains the following poems, arranged in six sections.

Geflüchtet unter das dänische Strohdach, Freunde
Verfolg ich euren Kampf. Hier schick ich euch
Wie hin und wieder schon, ein paar Wort, aufgescheucht
Durch blutige Gesichte über Sund und Laubwerk.
Verwendet, was euch erreicht davon, mit Vorsicht!
Vergilbte Bücher, brüchige Berichte
Sind meine Unterlage. Sehen wir uns wieder
Will ich gern wieder in die Lehre gehen.

Translation:

Refuged beneath this Danish thatched roof, friends
I follow your struggle. I send you now
As from time to time in the past, my poems, frightened into existence
By deadly visions across Sound and foliage.
Use cautiously those that reach you.
Yellowed books, fragmentary reports
Are my sources. If we see one another again
I will gladly go back to learning with you.

=== I Deutsche Kriegsfibel ('German War Primer') ===
Bei den Hochgestellten; Das Brot der Hungernden ist aufgegessen; Der Anstreicher spricht von kommenden großen Zeiten; Im Kalender ist der Tag noch nicht verzeichnet; Die Arbeiter schreien nach Brot; Die das Fleisch wegnehmen vom Tisch; Die Oberen sagen: Frieden und Krieg; Wenn der Anstreicher durch die Lautsprecher über den Frieden redet; Wenn die Oberen vom Frieden reden; Die Oberen; Mann mit der zerschlissenen Jacke; Auf der Mauer stand mit Kreide; Die Oberen sagen; Der Krieg, der kommen wird; Die Oberen sagen, im Heer; Wenn es zum Marschieren kommt, wissen viele nicht; General, dein Tank ist ein starker Wagen; Wenn der Krieg beginnt; Der Anstreicher wird sagen, daß irgendwo Länder erobert sind; Wenn der Trommler seinen Krieg beginnt.

=== II ===
This series of poems begins with the famous motto

In den finsteren Zeiten,
wird da auch gesungen werden?
Da wird auch gesungen werden.
Von den finsteren Zeiten.

Translation:

In the dark times
Will there also be singing?
Yes, there will also be singing
About the dark times.

It contains: Deutsches Lied; Ballade von der Judenhure Marie Sanders; Ballade von den Osseger Witwen; Lied der Starenschwärme; Ulm 1592 (Der Schneider von Ulm); Vom Kind, das sich nicht waschen wollte; Kleines Bettellied; Der Pflaumenbaum; Mein Bruder war ein Flieger; Der Gottseibeiuns; Keiner oder alle; Lied gegen den Krieg; Einheitsfrontlied; Resolution der Kommunarden.

=== III Chroniken ('Chronicles') ===
Fragen eines lesenden Arbeiters; Legende von der Entstehung des Buches Taoteking auf dem Weg des Laotse in die Emigration; Besuch bei den verbannten Dichtern; Gleichnis des Budda vom brennenden Haus; Die Teppichweber von Kujan-Bulak ehren Lenin; Die unbesiegliche Inschrift; Kohlen für Mike; Abbau des Schiffes Oskawa durch die Mannschaft; Inbesitznahme der großen Metro durch die moskauer Arbeiterschaft am 27. April 1935; Schnelligkeit des sozialistischen Aufbaus; Der große Mai.

=== IV ===
An den Schwankenden; An die Gleichgeschalteten; Auf den Tod eines Kämpfers für den Frieden; Rat an die bildenden Künstler..; Ansprache des Bauern an seinen Ochsen; Bei der Geburt eines Sohnes; Rede eines Arbeiters an einen Arzt; Appell; Verhöhnung des Soldaten der Revolution; Kantate zu Lenins Todestag; Lob des Revolutionärs; Grabschrift für Gorki.

=== V Deutsche Satiren ('German Satires') ===
Die Bücherverbrennung; Traum von einer großen Miesmacherin; Der Dienstzug; Schwierigkeit des Regierens; Notwendigkeit der Propaganda; Die Verbesserungen des Regimes; Die Ängste des Regimes; Kanonen nötiger als Butter; Die Jugend und das Dritte Reich; Der Krieg soll gut vorbereitet sein; Die Liebe zum Führer; Was der Führer nicht weiß; Wörter, die der Führer nicht hören kann; Die Sorgen des Kanzlers; Trost vom Kanzler; Der Jude, ein Unglück für das Volk; Die Regierung als Künstler; Dauer des Dritten Reiches; Verbot der Theaterkritik.

=== VI ===
This series of poems begins with the motto

Du der du, sitzend im Buge des Bootes
Siehest am unteren Ende das Leck
Wende lieber den Blick nicht weg
Denn du bist nicht aus dem Auge des Todes.

Translation:

Seated up in the boat's bows, as you
Notice the leak down at the other end
Better not turn your eyes away, my friend
For you are not outside Death's field of view.

It contains: Über die Bezeichnung Emigranten; Gedanken über die Dauer des Exils; Zufluchtstätte; Und in eurem Land?; Verjagt mit gutem Grund; An die Nachgeborenen.

== Editions and translations ==
One English translation of most of the Svendborger Gedichte is Bertold Brecht, Poems 1913-1956, ed. by John Willett, Ralph Manheim, and Erich Fried (London: Eyre Methuen, 1976). The poems are scattered through this anthology; there is a guide to their published order on pp. 506–9.

The poems are also translated in Bertold Brecht, The Collected Poems of Bertolt Brecht, trans. by David Constantine and Tom Kuhn (New York: Liveright, 2018).

German editions include:

- Bertolt Brecht, Gedichte, 10 vols (Frankfurt am Main: Suhrkamp, 1960–76), IV, 5–142.
