= Nigger Heaven =

1926 novel by Carl Van Vechten

- Author: Carl Van Vechten
- Language: English
- Genre: Fiction
- Publisher: Alfred A. Knopf
- Publication date: October 1926
- Publication place: United States
- Media type: Hardback
- Pages: 286
- OCLC: 647060292

Nigger Heaven is a novel by Carl Van Vechten published in October 1926. The book is set during the Harlem Renaissance in the United States in the 1920s. The book and its title have been controversial since its publication.

The novel is a portrayal of life in the "great black walled city" of Harlem, part of New York City. It describes the interactions of African American intellectuals, political activists, bacchanalian workers, and other Harlem characters. The plot concerns two people, a quiet librarian and an aspiring writer, who try to keep their love alive as racism denies them every opportunity.

This roman à clef became an instant bestseller and served as an informal guide book to Harlem. It also split the Black literary community, as some including Langston Hughes and Nella Larsen appreciated it, while others like Countee Cullen and W. E. B. Du Bois regarded it as an "affront to the hospitality of black folks". The book fuelled a period of "Harlemania", during which the neighborhood became en vogue among White people, who then frequented its cabarets and bars.

== Author ==
By the 1920s, Van Vechten was a noted music and dance critic in New York. Knopf had already published several of his novels by the time Nigger Heaven was conceived. He first became fascinated with Harlem when he read a book by a young Black writer, Walter White. He sought out White, who worked for the NAACP, and White introduced him to many black artists, which stimulated Van Vechten's appreciation for blues music and for Harlem. Van Vechten wrote to Gertrude Stein that, "I have passed practically my whole winter in company with Negroes and have succeeded in getting into most of the important sets", and told her of his future plans for "my negro novel". "This will not be a novel about negroes in the South or white contacts or lynchings. It will be about NEGROES, as they live now in the new city of Harlem (which is part of New York)."

== Synopsis ==
=== Title ===
"Nigger heaven" was a term used in the 19th century to refer to church balconies, which were segregated for African Americans, as the white members of the congregation sat below; cf. the use of paradise for the upper seats of a theatre.

=== Plot ===
The short novel begins with a prologue about a violent pimp nicknamed the Scarlet Creeper. The main part of the book is structured as two novellas. The first novella is centered on Mary Love, a young librarian who is fascinated by the diverse cultures of Harlem in which she lives, as well as its different hierarchies, and wants to belong but is unsure of her place in it. She briefly has a relationship with a writer named Byron Kasson and they have extended conversations on literature and art.

The second novella is Byron's story. He greatly resents the segregated nature of New York. After his relationship with Mary, he takes up with a debauched socialite as they explore the wild side of Harlem. The socialite dumps him adding to his earlier negative views on the society in which they live. The novel ends with a violent confrontation involving the Scarlet Creeper and Byron, and although the Creeper is at fault, Byron faces punishment for it.

== Reception ==
The book, due in part to the inclusion of the pejorative "nigger" in its title, was met with a mixed reception. It was initially banned in Boston. Van Vechten's father was said to have written his son two letters imploring that he change the title to something less offensive. Van Vechten discussed the title with poet Countee Cullen, who was enraged by it, and they had several arguments over it. According to reviewer Kelefa Sanneh, one interpretation is that although he was a white man, he felt he had licence to use the pejorative because he had cultivated many professional and personal relationships in Harlem. Van Vechten suggested that he knew most would still be offended and not forgive him; he was not averse to using the controversy to boost publicity, and he knew at least some in Harlem would defend him.

The ambivalence about the book, its title, and what it signifies about the author, has continued into the 21st century. According to Sanneh, Van Vechten meant the book to be a celebration of Harlem, but the title expressed the ambivalence about the place in the context of a largely segregated society. Van Vechten put the titular expression in the dialogue of one of his characters, who explained that the denizens of Harlem were stuck in the balcony of New York City, while the whites in the "good seats" downtown only occasionally and cruelly acknowledged them to laugh or sneer, but not to know them.

Despite central characters who were young, cultured, and Black, many early reviews of the novel "focused on the supposed 'immorality' of the novel, the naked presentation of sex and crime." W. E. B. Du Bois attacked the novel in an article published in The Crisis, the official magazine of the NAACP, upon its publication. He later addressed the text in depth in the essay "On Carl Van Vechten's Nigger Heaven", where he called the novel "an affront to the hospitality of black folk and to the intelligence of white." Conversely, other prominent reviews by African Americans lauded the text. Among them was that of James Weldon Johnson, which appeared in Opportunity, the official journal of the National Urban League. Wallace Thurman condemned both the text and the reaction to it. According to him, the novel wavers between sophistication and sentimentality, but sentimentality regrettably wins out; however, he says the "sting" of the book "to certain Negroes" is also not praiseworthy. Poet Langston Hughes, a friend of Van Vechten's, would go on to write poems to replace the songs used in the original manuscript and in the first printings of the text.

Opinions of the novel also diverged along racial lines. Many white critics of the time had little to compare Nigger Heaven to and viewed the novel as an enlightening, forward-minded text.

The controversy cast a long shadow over the reputation of its author. Ralph Ellison condemned both the book and the author in the 1950s. Historian of the Harlem Renaissance David Levering Lewis found the book at best quaint, but calls it a "colossal fraud", with Van Vechten's motives being a "a mixture of commercialism and patronizing sympathy". The book was successfully marketed to white people to help explore their fascination with the "other side of town". Later biographers, Emily Bernard (who nonetheless calls the title an "open wound") and especially Edward White, express more admiration for what Van Vechten attempted to do by crossing boundaries.

== See also ==
- Other novels set in the Harlem Renaissance

== Bibliography ==
- Du Bois, W.E.B. (1995). W.E.B. Du Bois: A Reader. New York, New York: Henry Holt & Co. ISBN 0-8050-3264-9.
- Hart, Robert C. (1973). "Literary Relations in the Harlem Renaissance". American Literature. 44 (4): 612–28. doi:10.2307/2924308. JSTOR 2924308.
- Helbling, Mark (1976). "Carl Van Vechten and the Harlem Renaissance". Negro American Literature Forum. 10 (2): 39–47. doi:10.2307/3041204. JSTOR 3041204.
- Lewis, David Levering (1995). The Portable Harlem Renaissance Reader. New York, New York: Penguin. ISBN 0140170367.
- Perkins, Margo V. (1988). "The Achievement and Failure of Nigger Heaven: Carl Van Vechten and the Harlem Renaissance". CLA Journal. 42 (1): 1–23. JSTOR 44323176.
- Van Vechten, Carl (2000). Nigger Heaven. Champaign, IL: University of Illinois Press. ISBN 0-252-06860-2.
- Worth, Robert F. (1995). "Nigger Heaven and the Harlem Renaissance". African American Review. 29 (3): 461–73. doi:10.2307/3042395. JSTOR 3042395.
