= Dark Laughter =

Novel by Sherwood Anderson

- First edition cover
- Author: Sherwood Anderson
- Publisher: Boni & Liveright
- Publication date: 1925
- Publication place: United States
- Preceded by: Many Marriages
- Followed by: Tar: A Midwest Childhood

Dark Laughter is a 1925 novel by the American author Sherwood Anderson. It dealt with the new sexual freedom of the 1920s, a theme also explored in his 1923 novel Many Marriages and later works. The influence of James Joyce's Ulysses, which Anderson had read before writing the 1925 novel, is expressed in Dark Laughter.

Dark Laughter was Anderson's only best-seller during his life, but today he is better known and respected for Winesburg, Ohio. Out of print since the early 1960s, since the late twentieth century the novel has been considered a failure by some critics, including Kim Townsend, the author of a 1985 biography of Anderson.

Ernest Hemingway parodied Dark Laughter in his early short work The Torrents of Spring. Hemingway's novella mocked the pretensions of Anderson's style and characters. Gertrude Stein, his former mentor, objected to the young writer's parody of a writer who had helped him get published, and they had a falling-out.

The novel was included in Life Magazine's list of the 100 outstanding books of 1924–1944.
