= Alice and the Lost Novel =

1929 essay collection by Sherwood Anderson

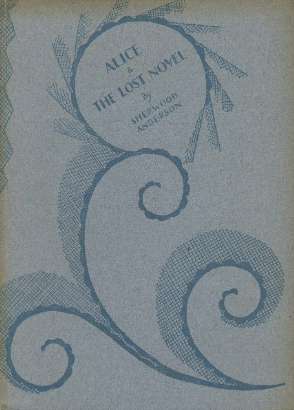
- Author: Sherwood Anderson
- Language: English
- Series: Short Novels of the Twentieth Century
- Genre: Essay collection; Autobiography
- Publisher: Elkin Mathews and Marrot
- Publication date: 1929
- Publication place: United States

Alice and The Lost Novel is a 1929 book containing a collection of two autobiographical essays by the American author Sherwood Anderson (1876–1941).

== Publication and description ==
Alice and The Lost Novel was issued as part of the “Short Novels of the Twentieth Century” series by the London publisher Elkin Mathews and Marrot, in a limited edition of 530 numbered and signed copies, making it one of Anderson’s rarest publications.

The volume consists of two autobiographical prose pieces, “Alice” and “The Lost Novel”, in which Anderson reflects on the creative process, the struggles of the writer’s life, and the emotional undercurrents that shaped his fiction. Both essays offer a deeply personal look into the author’s artistic philosophy and his preoccupation with authenticity, failure, and the search for meaning through art.

== Critical reception ==
The 1930 review in The Guardian stated, "As the authors in one of Mr. Sherwood Anderson's stories agree, "you almost get at something sometimes," but the aspiring writer can hardly hope for more than that. Mr. Anderson is a little disappointing; he writes almost as though he were telegraphing, and as in the telegram, he seems to try for the absolute and miss the warm, human modulations." The New Statesman critic stated, "One danger of the new, personal kind of short story is that it tends to droop away into the essay. This is a grave flaw in Mr. Anderson's two brief tales—he stops at times to insert such pure essay touches as: "I mean an artist, of course. They can be first-class lovers. It may be they are the only lovers. And they are absolutely ruthless about throwing direct personal love aside."
