= The Torrents of Spring =

1926 novella by Ernest Hemingway

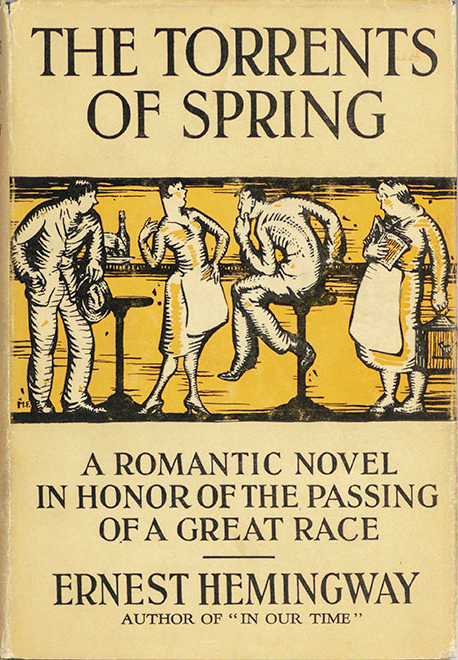
The Torrents of Spring front cover art

The Torrents of Spring is a novella written by Ernest Hemingway, published in 1926. Subtitled "A Romantic Novel in Honor of the Passing of a Great Race", Hemingway used the work as a spoof of the world of writers. It is Hemingway's first long work and was written as a parody of Sherwood Anderson's Dark Laughter.

== Synopsis ==
Set in northern Michigan, The Torrents of Spring concerns two men who work at a pump factory: World War I veteran Yogi Johnson, and writer Scripps O'Neill. Both are searching for the perfect woman, though they disagree over this ideal.

The story begins with O'Neill returning home from the library to find that his wife and small daughter have left him, explaining that "It takes a lot to mend the walls of fate." O'Neill, desperate for companionship, befriends a British waitress, Diana, at the restaurant where she works and immediately asks her to marry him.

Diana makes an attempt to impress her spouse by reading books from the lists of The New York Times Book Review, including many forgotten pot-boilers of the 1920s. But O'Neill soon leaves her (as she feared he would when she first met him) for another waitress, Mandy, who enthralls him with her store of literary (but possibly made up) anecdotes.

Yogi Johnson has a period during which he anguishes over the fact that he doesn't seem to desire any woman at all, even though spring is approaching, "which turns a young man's fancy to love." At last, he falls in love with an Indigenous American woman who enters a restaurant clothed only in moccasins, the wife of one of the two Indigenous Americans he befriends near the end of the story, in the penultimate chapter. Johnson is cured of his impotence when, viewing the naked woman, he is overcome by "a new feeling" which he hastens to attribute to Mother Nature, and together they "light out for the territories."

== Publication ==
It was widely believed that Hemingway wrote The Torrents of Spring in an effort to get out of his contract with his publisher Boni & Liveright, though Hemingway denied this. They held the right of first refusal for his next three books, one of which was to be a novel, with the proviso that the contract would be terminated if one of the three were rejected. By rejecting Torrents, Boni & Liveright terminated the contract. In his letters, Hemingway shows a passionate affection for his novella. He corresponded with Sherwood Anderson in May–July 1926, stating that the writing of his first long work was more motivated by his refusal to "pull punches" and encourage sub-par work out of Anderson—as his peer—and not to simply get out of a contract with Boni & Liveright.

The Torrents of Spring was a satirical treatment of pretentious writers. Written in ten days, at an average of 2,000 words a day, the work did not undergo Hemingway's typical editing process. Hemingway submitted the manuscript early in December 1925, and it was rejected by the end of the month. In January 1926, Max Perkins at Scribner's agreed to publish The Torrents of Spring in addition to Hemingway's future work. The Torrents of Spring was published by Scribner's in May of that year; the first edition had a print run of 1,250 copies.

== Critical reception ==
Mixed reaction greeted the novella, itself sharply critical of other writers. The work is generally dismissed by critics and seen as vastly less important than The Sun Also Rises, which was published in the same year. Hadley Richardson, Hemingway's wife at the time, believed his characterization of Anderson was "nasty", while John Dos Passos considered it funny but did not want to see it published. F. Scott Fitzgerald, on the other hand, considered the novella a masterpiece. Little scholarly criticism has been devoted to The Torrents of Spring, as it is considered less important than Hemingway's subsequent work. American readers would have recognized "a Great Race" in the subtitle as alluding to Madison Grant's The Passing of the Great Race, a eugenic history and argument for the superiority of Nordic blood, influential in the USA and Germany when first published (1916).

== Sources ==
- Baker, Carlos H. (1981). Ernest Hemingway: Selected Letters 1917-1961. New York: Charles Scribner's Sons. ISBN 0-684-17658-0.
- Berg, A. Scott (1979). Max Perkins: Editor of Genius. New York: Washington Square Press. ISBN 0-671-46847-2.
- Mellow, James R. (1992). Hemingway: A Life Without Consequences. New York: Houghton Mifflin. ISBN 0-395-37777-3.
- Meyers, Jeffrey (1985). Hemingway: A Biography. London: Macmillan. ISBN 0-333-42126-4.
- Oliver, Charles M. (1999). Ernest Hemingway A to Z: The Essential Reference to the Life and Work. New York: Checkmark. ISBN 0-8160-3467-2.
