= Poor White (novel) =

1920 novel by Sherwood Anderson

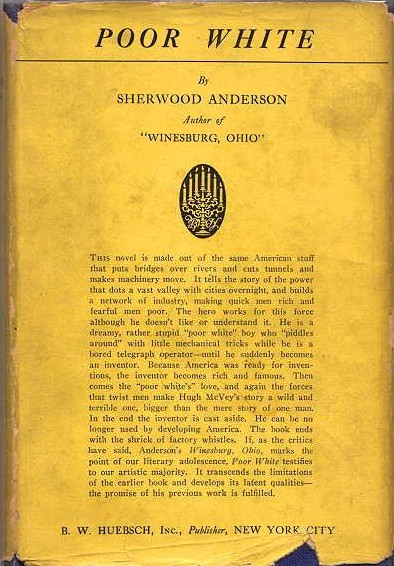
- First edition
- Author: Sherwood Anderson
- Language: English
- Publisher: B. W. Huebsch, Inc.
- Publication date: 1920
- Publication place: United States
- Media type: Print (hardback & paperback)
- OCLC: 544607

Poor White is an American novel by Sherwood Anderson, published in 1920. An episode in the novel inspired Bertold Brecht's poem "Kohlen für Mike" ("Coal for Mike"), published in his 1939 collected Svendborger Gedichte.

== Plot introduction ==
It is the story of an inventor, Hugh McVey, who rises from poverty on the banks of the Mississippi River. The novel shows the influence of industrialism on the rural heartland of America.
