= Troutdale, Virginia =

- Town
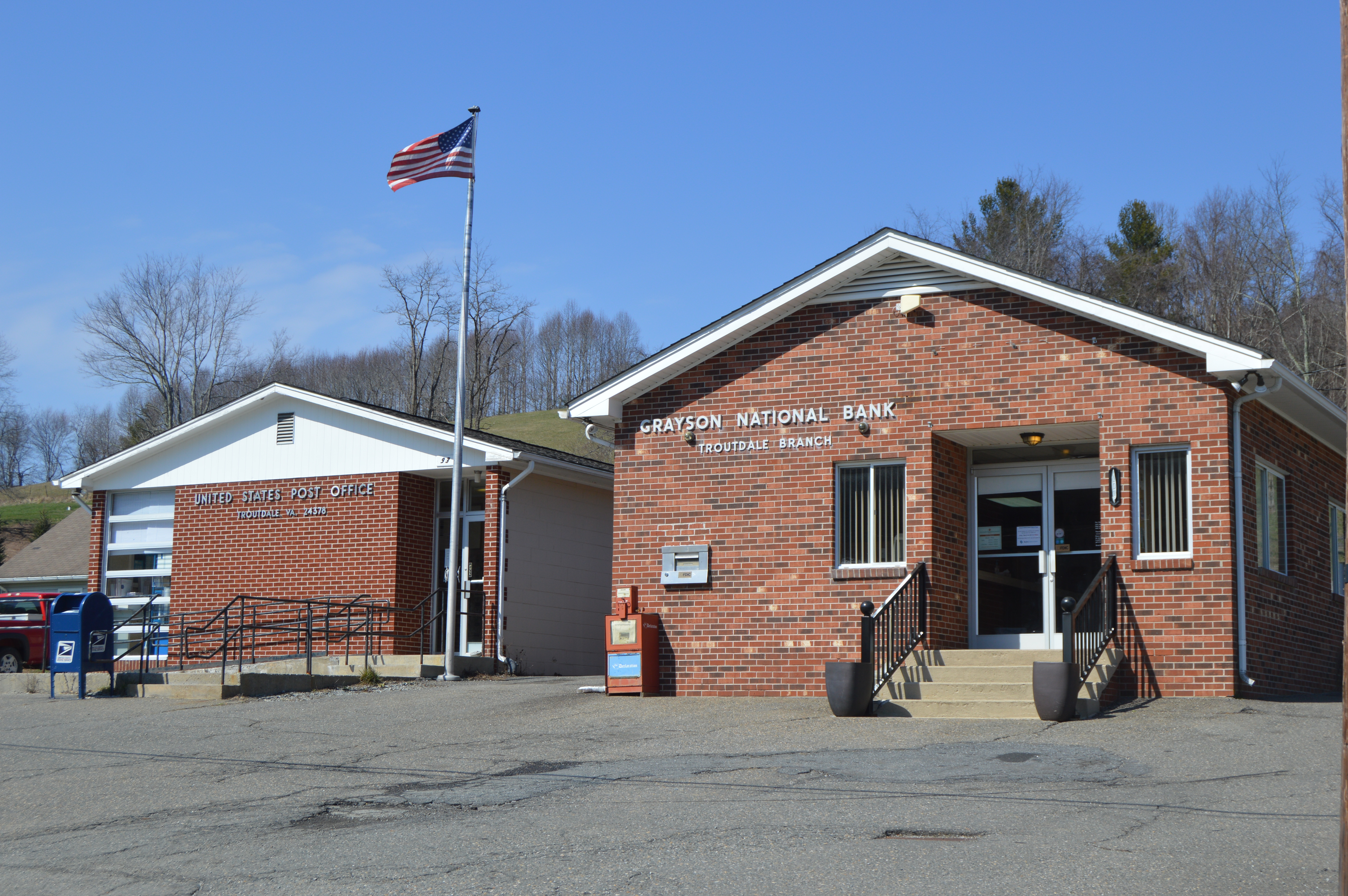
- Post office and bank

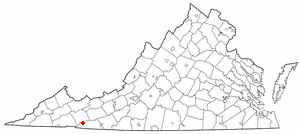
- Location of Troutdale, Virginia
- Coordinates: 36°42′3″N 81°26′41″W
- Country: United States
- State: Virginia
- County: Grayson

Area
  - Total: 3.13 sq mi (8.10 km^{2})
  - Land: 3.12 sq mi (8.09 km^{2})
  - Water: 0 sq mi (0.00 km^{2})
- Elevation: 3,127 ft (953 m)

Population (2020)
  - Total: 145 ▼
  - Estimate (2021): 140
  - Density: 53.1/sq mi (20.52/km^{2})
- Time zone: UTC-5 (Eastern (EST))
  - Summer (DST): UTC-4 (EDT)
- ZIP code: 24378
- Area code: 276
- FIPS code: 51-79456
- GNIS feature ID: 2391451

Troutdale is a town in Grayson County, Virginia, United States. The population was 140 at the 2020 census.

== Geography ==
Troutdale is located at 36°42′3″N 81°26′41″W (36.700963, -81.444823).

According to the United States Census Bureau, the town has a total area of 3.1 square miles (8.1 km^{2}), all land.

== Climate ==
The climate in this area has mild differences between highs and lows, and there is adequate rainfall year-round. According to the Köppen Climate Classification system, Troutdale has a marine west coast climate, abbreviated "Cfb" on climate maps.

== History ==
Troutdale was chartered as a town by the Virginia Legislature in 1906 and remains an incorporated town with a council and mayor. The Troutdale town limit is a circle of 1 mile radius. In 1930, Carrie Wright was elected as mayor, possibly the first female mayor in Virginia.

== Demographics ==
Historical population
Census	Pop.	Note	%±
1910	431		—
1920	636		47.6%
1930	357		−43.9%
1940	334		−6.4%
1950	250		−25.1%
1960	273		9.2%
1970	209		−23.4%
1980	248		18.7%
1990	196		−21.0%
2000	1,230		527.6%
2010	178		−85.5%
2020	145		−18.5%
2021 (est.)	140	▼	−3.4%
U.S. Decennial Census

The original 2000 census listed Troutdale with a population of 1,230, a very sharp increase from 192 in 1990. This, and the similarly anomalous figure of 30.89% black American population, was the result of a tabulation error in which much of the population of Wise County's correctional facilities were counted as Troutdale residents. census revision

As of the census of 2000, there were 1,230 people, 79 households, and 56 families living in the town. The population density was 395.5 inhabitants per square mile (152.7/km^{2}). There were 111 housing units at an average density of 35.7 per square mile (13.8/km^{2}). The racial makeup of the town was 67.80% White, 30.89% African American, 0.41% Asian, 0.81% from other races, and 0.08% from two or more races. Hispanic or Latino of any race were 0.89% of the population.

There were 79 households, out of which 21.5% had children under the age of 18 living with them, 54.4% were married couples living together, 11.4% had a female householder with no husband present, and 29.1% were non-families. 22.8% of all households were made up of individuals, and 7.6% had someone living alone who was 65 years of age or older. The average household size was 2.46 and the average family size was 2.93.

The median income for a household in the town was $38,438, and the median income for a family was $45,833. Males had a median income of $24,258 versus $16,250 for females. The per capita income for the town was $18,139. About 3.2% of families and 3.6% of the population were below the poverty line, including 5.6% of those under age 18 and 2.9% of those age 65 or over.

== Event ==
The Troutdale Fire Department sponsors "Troutdale Days" on the second Saturday of August each year, including a parade, contests, entertainment, and food.

== Notable person ==
- The American writer Sherwood Anderson lived here during the summers from 1927 and full-time in his later years. His Ripshin Farm has been designated as a National Historic Landmark.
