= Death in the Woods =

1933 short story collection by Sherwood Anderson

First edition (publ. Liveright)

Death in the Woods is a 1933 short story collection by Sherwood Anderson. It was the last of Anderson's books to be published by Boni & Liveright before the firm's financial collapse. Most of the stories in the collection were previously published either in magazines ("Why They Got Married" appeared in the March 1929 issue of Vanity Fair, for example, and "A Meeting South" was first published in The Dial of April 1925) and books (versions of "Death in the Woods" and "A Meeting South" were included in Tar: A Midwest Childhood and Sherwood Anderson's Notebook (both 1926), respectively). According to John Earl Bassett, most of the stories in Death in the Woods were written between 1926 and 1930 with four preceding that time and one following.

== The Stories ==
The collection is made up of 16 stories:

- "Death in the Woods"
- "The Return"
- "There She Is—She is Taking Her Bath"
- "The Lost Novel"
- "The Fight"
- "Like a Queen"
- "That Sophistication"
- "In a Strange Town"
- "These Mountaineers"
- "A Sentimental Journey"
- "A Jury Case"
- "Another Wife"
- "A Meeting South"
- "The Flood"
- "Why They Got Married"
- "Brother Death"

== Plot of the title story ==
"Death in the Woods" is presented as a first-person narrative by an unreliable narrator, who tells the story of an old woman, Mrs. Grimes. Mrs. Grimes lives on the edge of society and survives by selling eggs and using the proceeds to buy food for herself, her small family and the animals in her care. Her husband is considered to be a horse thief, and the couple is looked down on by others.

Mrs. Grimes' personal history, according to the narrator, is that she was abandoned by her mother and grew up as an indentured servant. It is suggested that there she received inappropriate attentions from her German master. The master's wife was suspicious and perhaps cruel toward her. Mrs. Grimes agrees to marry Jake Grimes, who "helps" her escape her German master and his wife.

Mrs. Grimes and Jake Grimes have a son and a daughter, but the daughter died in childhood. The narrator tells us that their son grows up to be like his father. Both of them verbally abused Mrs. Grimes and treat her in a manner similar to the way the German and his wife had treated her. She does not know life could be any different as this is all she ever experienced, according to the narrator. Her main concern in life is taking care of, and feeding the animals and people in her care. Her duty, she feels, is to feed animal life.

On the last day of her life, Mrs. Grimes walks into town to trade some eggs and buy some meager supplies. Her dogs follow her into town. According to the narrator, the butcher was unusually friendly and compassionate on this visit (because of the snowy, cold weather), giving her some extra liver and speaking to her kindly. She begins her walk home late in the day.

On her way home, she leaves the road and walks through the woods, probably a short cut. On this shortcut she reaches a clearing where she sits down to rest. While sitting down, she dies. The dogs, that had been following her, run around her in circles, then rip the pack away from her and devour the food inside.

The body is discovered by a hunter, who goes into town and tells everyone about the body in the woods. A group of men and some boys, including the narrator, walk into the woods to examine the body and bring it back.

When the narrator and his brother return home, the older brother tells the story. Our narrator set down his version of the story many years later, because he felt that his brother had not been able to properly and efficiently explain the events.

There are other stories that are re-tellings of events or stories told by unreliable narrators–meaning they do not necessarily give readers accurate, cold-hard facts. The stories are from their points-of-view, or how they interpret the events or happenings. It is their "working out" of their past experiences.

== Sources ==
- Bassett, John Earl (2005). Sherwood Anderson: An American Career. Plainsboro, NJ: Susquehanna UP. ISBN 1-57591-102-7
- Dardis, Tom (1995). Firebrand: The Life of Horace Liveright. New York: Random House. ISBN 978-0-679-40675-4
- Townsend, Kim (1987). Sherwood Anderson: A Biography. Boston: Houghton Mifflin. ISBN 0-395-36533-3
