= Windy McPherson's Son =

1916 novel by Sherwood Anderson

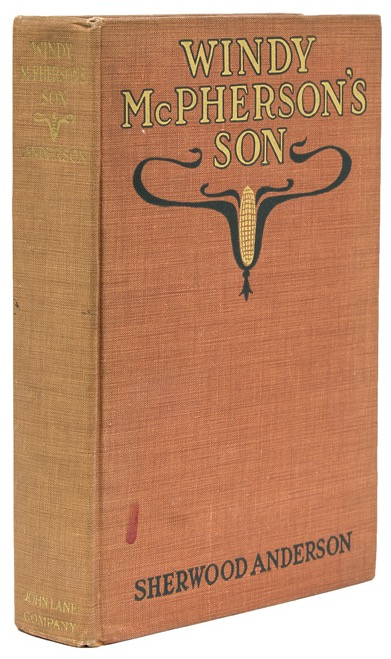
- First edition cover
- Author: Sherwood Anderson
- Language: English
- Genre: Novel
- Publisher: John Lane Company, New York
- Publication date: 1916
- Publication place: United States
- Media type: Print (hardcover)
- Pages: 347
- OCLC: 635768

Windy McPherson's Son is a 1916 novel by American author Sherwood Anderson. It was published by John Lane as part of a three-book contract. Windy McPherson's Son is Sherwood Anderson's first novel.

== Development history ==
In September 1907, the Anderson family (at that time just Sherwood, his wife Cornelia and son Robert) moved from Cleveland to Elyria, Ohio, where Anderson became head of the Anderson Manufacturing Company (name changed to American Merchants Company after 1911). As part of the family's new home, Anderson set aside an attic where he would escape the stresses of business and family life. It was during one winter between 1907 and 1912 that both this room and his office (where Frances Shute, his secretary, would sometimes stay late typing drafts of his first two novels) served as the settings in which Windy McPherson's Sons was composed. Though it is likely that most of his first novel was composed in Elyria, there is some evidence pointing to possible edits made between those early years and the novel's publication in 1916.

Obvious parallels can be drawn between the plot of Anderson's own life and that of his first novel. The beginning section of the novel is inspired by his youth, the second "...combined the ways he had tried to make money in Chicago and Ohio..." and the marriage between Sam and Sue resembles the one between Sherwood and Cornelia. The characters of Mary Underwood and Janet Eberly were likely inspired by Trillena White, a high school teacher that befriended Anderson while he attended the Wittenberg Academy in Springfield, Ohio between 1899 and June 4, 1900, and stayed for a time with the Andersons in Elyria.

In addition to the personal connections between Windy McPherson's Son and the author's life made by biographers and critics, the influence of other writers is also seen in the book. Anderson himself said of his early writing that he had, "come to novel writing by novel reading." In particular, William Dean Howells (whose writing Anderson disliked), Arnold Bennett, Thomas Hardy, Henry Fuller, Frank Norris, Theodore Dreiser, and George Borrow, are all mentioned by Anderson biographer Kim Townsend as authors Anderson would have been reading and discussing at the time he wrote Windy McPherson's Son. In his 1951 biography of Anderson, however, Irving Howe denies such influences, and contradicts Anderson's own statement, arguing that other than the "early social novels of H. G. Wells and the radical-adventure stories of Jack London... Anderson's early novels were all too much his own, reflecting in their style the natural inclination of a poorly educated writer to strain for the literary and lapse into the colloquial."

== Plot ==
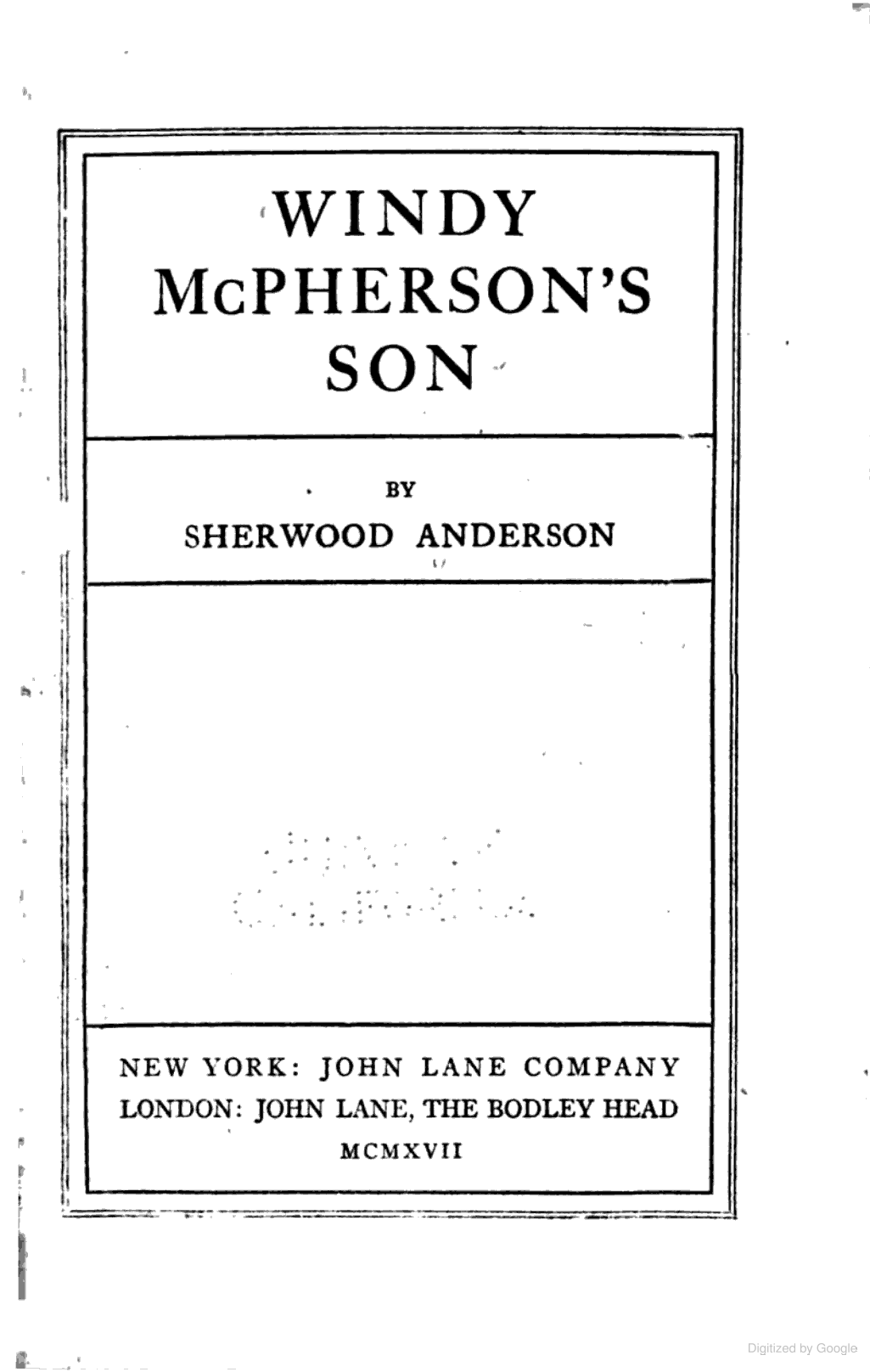
First edition title page of Windy McPherson's Son (1916)

Windy McPherson's Son is the story of Sam McPherson's rise in the world of business and search for emotional enlightenment in later life. McPherson starts out as an ambitious newsboy in Caxton, Iowa, with drunkard of a father who constantly embarrasses him. Eventually, after his mother's death and an episode with a middle-aged schoolteacher, McPherson leaves Caxton for Chicago. In Chicago, he gets a job as a buyer of farm implements and establishes his reputation in business. While his professional life is blossoming, his personal life suffers. After meeting Sue Rainey, the daughter of his boss Colonel Rainey, they get married and twice fail to have children. Following a business deal that forces his father-in-law out of his own company, McPherson and Sue Rainey separate.

One day, once McPherson had become quite wealthy, he gets a telegram saying that Colonel Rainey committed suicide. This causes Sam to realize that he is unhappy with his life. This feeling inspires him to leave Chicago and travel all over becoming involved in various adventures. Finally, McPherson comes across a promiscuous and alcoholic mother of three children. A deal is made and McPherson gets custody of the children. Showing up with the children at Sue's current place of residence, the five of them become family.

== Sources ==
- Duffey, Bernard (1966). "From The Chicago Renaissance in American Letters: A Critical History". in White, Ray Lewis (ed). The Achievement of Sherwood Anderson: Essays in Criticism. Chapel Hill, NC: University of North Carolina. OCLC 276748
- Howe, Irving (1951). Sherwood Anderson. New York: William Sloane Associates.
- Rideout, Walter (2006). Sherwood Anderson: A Writer in America. Vol. 1. Madison, WI: University of Wisconsin Press. ISBN 9780299215309
- Townsend, Kim (1987). Sherwood Anderson: A Biography. Boston: Houghton Mifflin. ISBN 0-395-36533-3
- White, Ray Lewis (1994). "Introduction". in Anderson, Sherwood. Windy McPherson's Son. Chicago, IL: Illinois UP. ISBN 978-0-252-06357-2
