= Many Marriages =

1923 novel by Sherwood Anderson

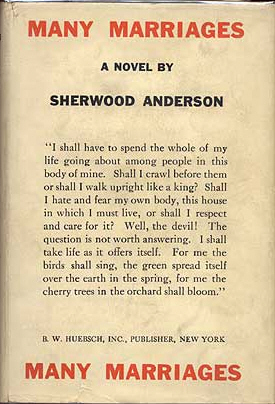
- First edition cover
- Author: Sherwood Anderson
- Language: English
- Genre: Novel
- Publisher: B.W. Huebsch
- Publication date: February 20, 1923
- Publication place: United States
- Media type: Print (hardback and paperback)
- OCLC: 1135265

Many Marriages is a novel by Sherwood Anderson published in 1923. In this novel, Anderson continued his use of new psychological insights to explore his characters.

Because Anderson explored the new sexual freedom in the novel, it was attacked in an American crusade against "dirty books", which also objected to D.H. Lawrence's Women in Love. Sales of Anderson's novel declined markedly after this unwelcome publicity.

F. Scott Fitzgerald considered Many Marriages to be Anderson's finest novel.

== Sources ==
- Fitzgerald, F. Scott (March 4, 1923). "Sherwood Anderson on the Marriage Question," New York Herald section 9: 5.
- Rideout, Walter (2006). Sherwood Anderson: A Writer in America. Vol. 1. Madison, WI: University of Wisconsin Press. ISBN 9780299215309
