= Marion College (Virginia) =

U.S. women's junior college (1873–1967)

Coordinates: 36.8323382°N 81.5234481°W

- Type: Junior College
- Active: 1873–1967
- Affiliations: Lutheran
- Location: Marion, Virginia, United States
- Colors: Purple and Gold

Marion College was a Lutheran junior women's college that operated in Marion, Virginia, from 1873 to 1967.

Roanoke College, a sister Lutheran college, adopted Marion's alumnae and maintains their records. Marion's alumnae have a reunion every other year on the Roanoke campus. Roanoke's Marion Hall, constructed in 1968 as a women's residence hall, is named in honor of Marion College.

== Notable alumnae ==
- Brenda Holsinger Schwarzkopf, wife of Gen. Norman Schwarzkopf
