= Sherwood Anderson =

American writer (1876–1941)

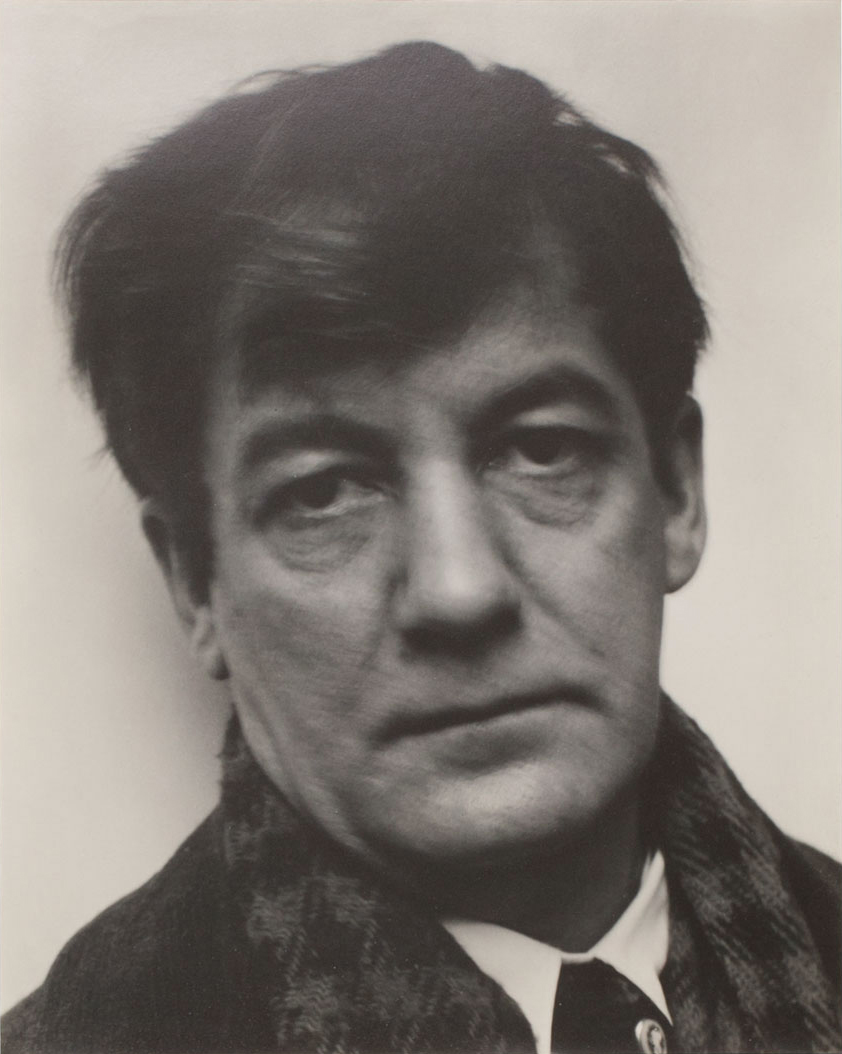
- Anderson in 1923
- Born: September 13, 1876; Camden, Ohio, U.S.
- Died: March 8, 1941 (aged 64); Colón, Panama
- Occupation: Author
- Spouse(s): Cornelia Pratt Lane (1904–1916); Tennessee Claflin Mitchell (1916–1924); Elizabeth Prall (1924–1932); Eleanor Copenhaver (1933–1941)
- Writing career
- Notable work: Winesburg, Ohio

Signature
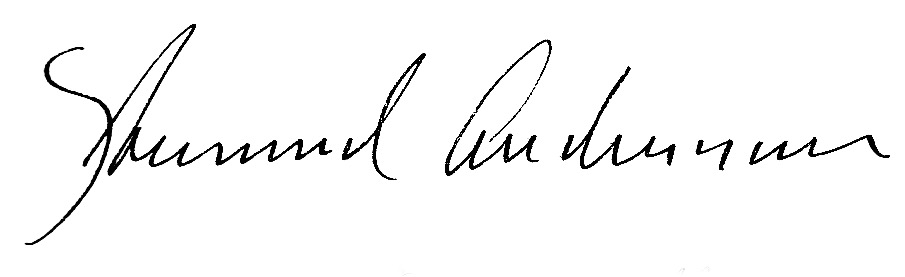

Sherwood Anderson (September 13, 1876 – March 8, 1941) was an American novelist and short story writer, known for subjective and self-revealing works. Self-educated, he rose to become a successful copywriter and business owner in Cleveland and Elyria, Ohio. In 1912, Anderson had a nervous breakdown that led him to abandon his business and family to become a writer.

At the time, he moved to Chicago and was eventually married three additional times. His most enduring work is the short-story sequence Winesburg, Ohio, which launched his career. Throughout the 1920s, Anderson published several short story collections, novels, memoirs, books of essays, and a book of poetry. Though his books sold reasonably well, his only bestseller was Dark Laughter (1925), a novel inspired by Anderson's time in the American army in Cuba, his residing in New Orleans during the 1920s, his employment as a factory worker and in advertising, and his life in the small-town midwest. Dark Laughter remains of contemporary interest with its Joyce-influenced shifting points of view.

== Early life ==
Sherwood Berton Anderson was born on September 13, 1876, at 142 S. Lafayette Street in Camden, Ohio, a farming town with a population of around 650 (according to the 1870 census). He was the third of seven children born to Emma Jane (née Smith) and former Union soldier and harness-maker Irwin McLain Anderson. Considered reasonably well-off financially, Anderson's father was seen as an up-and-comer by his Camden contemporaries, but the family left town just before Sherwood's first birthday. Reasons for the departure are uncertain; most biographers note rumors of debts incurred by either Irwin or his brother Benjamin. The Andersons headed north to Caledonia by way of a brief stay in a village of a few hundred called Independence (now Butler). Four or five years were spent in Caledonia, years that formed Anderson's earliest memories. This period later inspired his semi-autobiographical novel Tar: A Midwest Childhood (1926). In Caledonia Anderson's father began drinking excessively, which led to financial difficulties, eventually causing the family to leave the town.

With each move, Irwin Anderson's prospects dimmed; while in Camden he was the proprietor of a successful shop and could employ an assistant, but by the time the Andersons finally settled down in Clyde, Ohio, in 1884, Irwin could get work only as a hired man to harness manufacturers. That job was short-lived, and for the rest of Sherwood Anderson's childhood, his father barely supported the family as an occasional sign-painter and paperhanger, while his mother took in washing to make ends meet. Partly as a result of these misfortunes, young Sherwood became adept at finding various odd jobs to help his family, earning the nickname "Jobby".

Though he was a decent student, Anderson's attendance at school declined as he began picking up work, and he finally left school for good at age 14 after about nine months of high school. From the time he began to cut school to the time he left town, Anderson worked as a "newsboy, errand boy, waterboy, cow-driver, stable groom, and perhaps printer's devil, not to mention assistant to Irwin Anderson, Sign Painter", in addition to assembling bicycles for the Elmore Manufacturing Company. Even in his teens, Anderson's talent for selling was evident, a talent he would later draw on in a successful career in advertising. As a newsboy he was said to have convinced a tired farmer in a saloon to buy two copies of the same evening paper.

In addition to participating in local events and spending time with his friends, Anderson was a voracious reader. Though there were only a few books in the Anderson home, the youth read widely by borrowing from the school library (there was not a public library in Clyde until 1903) and the personal libraries of a school superintendent and of John Tichenor, a local artist, who responded to Anderson's interest.

By Anderson's 18th year in 1895, his family was on shaky ground. His father had started to disappear for weeks. Two years earlier, in 1893, Karl, Sherwood's elder brother, had left Clyde for Chicago. On May 10, 1895, his mother succumbed to tuberculosis. Sherwood, now essentially on his own, boarded at the Harvey & Yetter's livery stable where he worked as a groom—an experience that would translate into several of his best-known stories. (Irwin Anderson died in 1919 after having been estranged from his son for two decades.) Two months before his mother's death, in March 1895, Anderson had signed up with the Ohio National Guard for a five-year hitch, while he was going steady with Bertha Baynes, an attractive girl and possibly the inspiration for Helen White in Winesburg, Ohio, and he was working a secure job at the bicycle factory. But his mother's death precipitated his leaving Clyde. He settled in Chicago around late 1896 or the spring or summer of 1897, having worked a few small-town factory jobs along the way.

== Chicago and war ==
Anderson moved to a boardinghouse in Chicago owned by a former mayor of Clyde. His brother Karl lived in the city and was studying at the Art Institute. Anderson moved in with him and quickly found a job at a cold-storage plant. In late 1897, Karl moved away, and Anderson relocated to a two-room flat with his sister and two younger brothers newly come from Clyde. Money was tight—Anderson earned "two dollars for a day of ten hours"— but with occasional support from Karl, they got by. Following the example of his Clyde confederate and lifelong friend Cliff Paden (later to become known as John Emerson) and Karl, Anderson took up the idea of furthering his education by enrolling in night school at the Lewis Institute. He attended several classes regularly including "New Business Arithmetic" earning marks that placed him second in the class. It was also there that Anderson heard lectures on Robert Browning and was possibly first introduced to the poetry of Walt Whitman. Soon, however, Anderson's first stint in Chicago would come to an end as the United States prepared to enter the Spanish–American War.

Although he had limited resources while in Chicago, Anderson bought a new suit and returned to Clyde to join the military. Once home, the company he joined mustered into the army at Camp Bushnell, Ohio on May 12, 1898. Several months of training followed at various southern encampments until early in 1899, when his company was sent to Cuba. Fighting had ceased four months prior to their arrival. On April 21, 1899, they left Cuba having seen no combat. According to Irving Howe, "Sherwood was popular among his army comrades, who remembered him as a fellow given to prolonged reading, mostly in dime westerns and historical romances, and talented at finding a girl when he wanted one. For the first of these traits he was frequently teased, but the second brought him the respect it usually does in armies."

After the war, Anderson resided briefly in Clyde performing agricultural work before deciding to return to school. In September 1899 Anderson joined his siblings Karl and Stella in Springfield, Ohio where, at the age of twenty-three he enrolled for his senior year of preparatory school at the Wittenberg Academy, a preparatory school located on the campus of the Wittenberg University. In his time there he performed well, earning good marks and participating in several extracurricular activities. In the spring of 1900 Anderson graduated from the academy, offering a discourse on Zionism as one of the eight students chosen to give a commencement speech.

== Business, marriage and family ==
During his time in Springfield, Anderson stayed and worked as a "chore boy" in a boardinghouse called The Oaks among a group of businessmen, educators, and other creative types, many of whom became friendly with the young Anderson. In particular, a high school teacher named Trillena White and a businessman Harry Simmons played a role in the author's life. The former, who was ten years Anderson's senior, would walk—raising eyebrows among the other boarders—with the young man in the evenings. More importantly, according to Anderson, she "first introduced me to fine literature" and would later serve as inspiration for a number of his characters including the teacher Kate Swift in Winesburg, Ohio. The latter, who worked as the advertising manager for Mast, Crowell, and Kirkpatrick (later Crowell-Collier Publishing Company, publishers of the Woman's Home Companion) and occasionally took meals at The Oaks, was so impressed by Anderson's commencement speech that he offered him a job on the spot as an advertising solicitor at his company's Chicago office. Thus, in the summer of 1900, Anderson returned to Chicago where most of his siblings were now living, intent on achieving success in his new white-collar occupation.

Though he performed well, problems with his boss and a dislike for the office routine and for the style of correspondence, which caused the ultimate rift, caused Anderson to leave Crowell in mid-1901 for a position set up for him by Marco Marrow, another friend from The Oaks, at the Frank B. White Advertising Company (later the Long-Critchfield Agency). There the author stayed until 1906, selling ads and writing advertising copy for manufacturers of farming implements and articles for the trade journal, Agricultural Advertising. In this latter magazine Anderson published his first professional work, a February 1902 piece called "The Farmer Wears Clothes." What followed were approximately 29 articles and essays for his company's magazine, and two for a small literary magazine published by the Bobbs-Merrill Company called The Reader. According to scholar Welford Dunaway Taylor, the two monthly columns ("Rot and Reason" and "Business Types") Anderson wrote for Agricultural Advertising exemplified the "character writing" (or character sketches) that would later become a notable part of the author's approach in Winesburg, Ohio and other works.

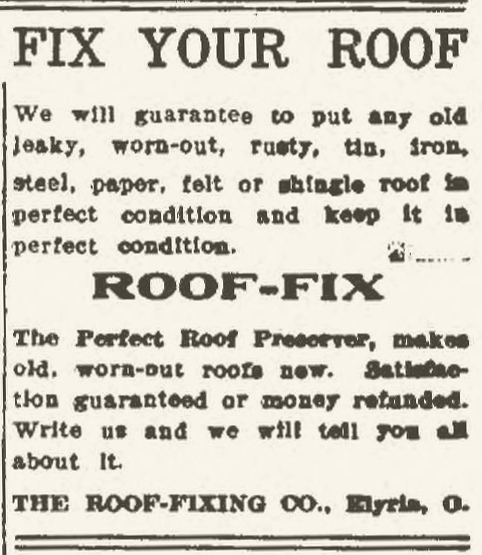
"Roof-Fix carried us to Elyria" wrote Sherwood Anderson's wife, Cornelia Lane, of the product her husband started a company to sell.

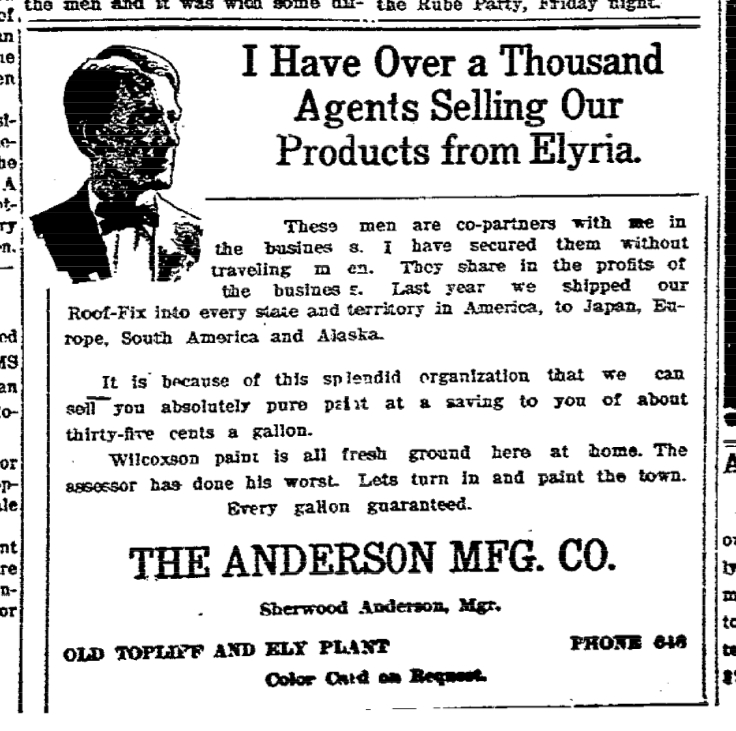
Advertisement for the Anderson Manufacturing Co., a company owned by Sherwood Anderson from 1907 to 1913, almost a decade before he became a well-known author

Part of Anderson's job in those early years of his career was making trips to solicit potential clients. On one of these trips around May 1903 he stopped in the home of a friend from Clyde, Jane "Jennie" Bemis, then living in Toledo, Ohio. It was there that he met Cornelia Pratt Lane (1877–1967), the daughter of wealthy Ohio businessman Robert Lane. The two were married a year later, on the 16th of May, in Lucas, Ohio. They would go on to have three children—Robert Lane (1907–1951), John Sherwood (1908–1995), and Marion (aka Mimi, 1911–1996). After a short honeymoon, the couple moved into an apartment on the south side of Chicago. For two additional years, Anderson worked for Long-Critchfield until an opportunity came along from one of the accounts he managed and so on Labor Day 1906, Sherwood Anderson left Chicago for Cleveland to become president of United Factories Company, a mail-order firm selling various items from surrounding firms.

While his new job, which amounted to the position of sales manager, could be stressful the happy home life Cornelia had fostered in Chicago continued in Cleveland; "his wife and he entertained frequently. They went to church on Sundays, with Anderson decked out in morning clothes and top hat. On occasional Sunday afternoons Cornelia taught him French. She also helped with his advertising work." His home life could not sustain him when one of the manufacturers United Factories marketed produced a large batch of defective incubators. Soon, letters addressed to Anderson (who personally guaranteed all products sold) began to arrive from customers both desperate and angry. The strain from months of answering hundreds of these letters while continuing his demanding schedule at work and home led to a nervous breakdown in the summer of 1907 and eventually his departure from the company.

His failure in Cleveland did not delay him for long, however, because in September 1907, the Andersons moved to Elyria, Ohio, a town of approximately ten thousand residents, where he rented a warehouse within sight of the railroad and began a mail-order business selling (at a markup of 500%) a preservative paint called "Roof-Fix". The first years in Elyria went very well for Anderson and his family; two more children were added for a total of three in addition to a busy social life for their parents. So well, in fact, did the Anderson Manufacturing Co. do that Anderson was able to purchase and absorb several similar businesses and expand his firm's product-lines under the name Anderson Paint Company. Carrying on that momentum, in late 1911 Anderson secured the financial backing to merge his companies into the American Merchants Company, a profit-sharing/investment firm operating in part on a scheme he developed around that time called "Commercial Democracy".

== Nervous breakdown ==
It was then, at what seemed the pinnacle of his business achievements, when the stresses of Anderson's professional life collided with his social responsibilities and his writing, that Anderson suffered the breakdown that has remained central to the "myth" or "legend" of his life.

On Thursday, November 28, 1912, Anderson came to his office in a slightly nervous state. According to his secretary, he opened some mail, and in the course of dictating a business letter became distracted. After writing a note to his wife, he murmured something along the lines of, "I feel as though my feet were wet, and they keep getting wetter." (Note: The quote above comes from the Frances Shute, Anderson's secretary at the time, as cited in Rideout (2006), 155. In Anderson (1924), it was remembered as, "I have been wading in a long river and my feet are wet. My feet are cold, wet and heavy from long wading in a river. Now I shall go walk on dry land", whereas in Anderson (1942), it was, "My feet are cold and wet. I have been walking too long on the bed of a river.") He then left the office. Four days later, on Sunday, December 1, a disoriented Anderson entered a drug store on East 152nd Street in Cleveland and asked the pharmacist to help figure out his identity. Unable to make out what the incoherent Anderson was saying, the pharmacist discovered a phone book on his person and called the number of Edwin Baxter, a member of the Elyria Chamber of Commerce. Baxter came, recognized Anderson, and promptly had him checked into the Huron Road Hospital in downtown Cleveland, where Anderson's wife, whom he would hardly recognize, went to meet him.

But even before returning home, Anderson began his lifelong practice of reinterpreting the story of his breakdown. Despite news reports in the Elyria Evening Telegram and the Cleveland Press following his admittance into the hospital that ascribed the cause of the breakdown to "overwork" and that mentioned Anderson's inability to remember what happened, on December 6 the story changed. All of a sudden, the breakdown became voluntary. The Evening Telegram reported (possibly spuriously) that "As soon as he recovers from the trance into which he placed himself, Sherwood Anderson ... will write a book of the sensations he experienced while he wandered over the country as a nomad." This same sense of personal agency is alluded to 30 years later in Sherwood Anderson's Memoirs (1942) where the author wrote of his thought process before walking out: "I wanted to leave, get away from business. ... Again I resorted to slickness, to craftiness...The thought occurred to me that if men thought me a little insane they would forgive me if I lit out...." This idea, however, that Anderson made a conscious decision on November 28 to make a clean break from family and business is unlikely. In the first place, contrary to what Anderson later claimed, his writing was no secret. It was known to his wife, secretary, and some business associates that for several years Anderson had been working on personal writing projects both at night and occasionally in his office at the factory. Secondly, although some of the notes he wrote were to himself during his journey, notes he mailed to his wife on Saturday, addressing the envelope "Cornelia L. Anderson, Pres., American Striving Co.", show that he had some semblance of memory. The general confusion and frequent incoherence the notes exhibit is unlikely to be deliberate. While diagnoses for the four days of Anderson's wanderings have ranged from "amnesia" to "lost identity" to "nervous breakdown", his condition is generally characterized today as a "fugue state." Anderson himself described the episode as "escaping from his materialistic existence," and was admired for his action by many young male writers who chose to be inspired by him. Herbert Gold wrote, "He fled in order to find himself, then prayed to flee that disease of self, to become 'beautiful and clear.'" After having moved back to Chicago, Anderson formally divorced Cornelia.

== Novelist ==
Anderson's first novel, Windy McPherson's Son, was published in 1916 as part of a three-book deal with John Lane. This book, along with his second novel, Marching Men (1917), are usually considered his "apprentice novels" because they came before Anderson found fame with Winesburg, Ohio (1919) and are generally considered inferior in quality to works that followed.

Anderson's most notable work is his collection of interrelated short stories, Winesburg, Ohio (1919). In his memoir, he wrote that "Hands", the opening story, was the first "real" story he ever wrote.

"Instead of emphasizing plot and action, Anderson used a simple, precise, unsentimental style to reveal the frustration, loneliness, and longing in the lives of his characters. These characters are stunted by the narrowness of Midwestern small-town life and by their own limitations."

In addition, Anderson was one of the first American novelists to introduce new insights from psychology, including Freudian analysis.

Although his short stories were very successful, Anderson wanted to write novels, which he felt allowed a larger scale. In 1920, he published Poor White, which was rather successful. In 1923, Anderson published Many Marriages; in it he explored the new sexual freedom, a theme which he continued in Dark Laughter and later writing. Dark Laughter had its detractors, but the reviews were, on the whole, positive. F. Scott Fitzgerald considered Many Marriages to be Anderson's finest novel.

Beginning in 1924, Sherwood and Elizabeth Prall Anderson moved to New Orleans, where they lived in the historic Pontalba Apartments (540-B St. Peter Street) adjoining Jackson Square in the heart of the French Quarter. For a time, they entertained William Faulkner, Carl Sandburg, Edmund Wilson and other writers, for whom Anderson was a major influence. Critics trying to define Anderson's significance have said he was more influential through this younger generation than through his own works.

Anderson referred to meeting Faulkner in his ambiguous and moving short story, "A Meeting South." His novel Dark Laughter (1925) drew from his New Orleans experiences and continued to explore the new sexual freedom of the 1920s. Although the book was satirized by Ernest Hemingway in his novella The Torrents of Spring, it was a bestseller at the time, the only book of Anderson's to reach that status during his lifetime.

== Marriage ==
Anderson and Cornelia Lane married in 1904, had his only 3 children, and divorced in 1916. Anderson quickly married the sculptor Tennessee Claflin Mitchell (1874–1929), obtaining a divorce from her in Reno, Nevada in 1924.

In 1924, Anderson married Elizabeth Norma Prall (1884–1976), a friend of Faulkner's whom he had met in New York before his divorce from Mitchell. After several years, they divorced in 1932.

In 1928 Anderson became involved with Eleanor Gladys Copenhaver (1896–1985), whom he married in 1933. They traveled and often studied together, and were both active in the trade union movement.

== Later work ==
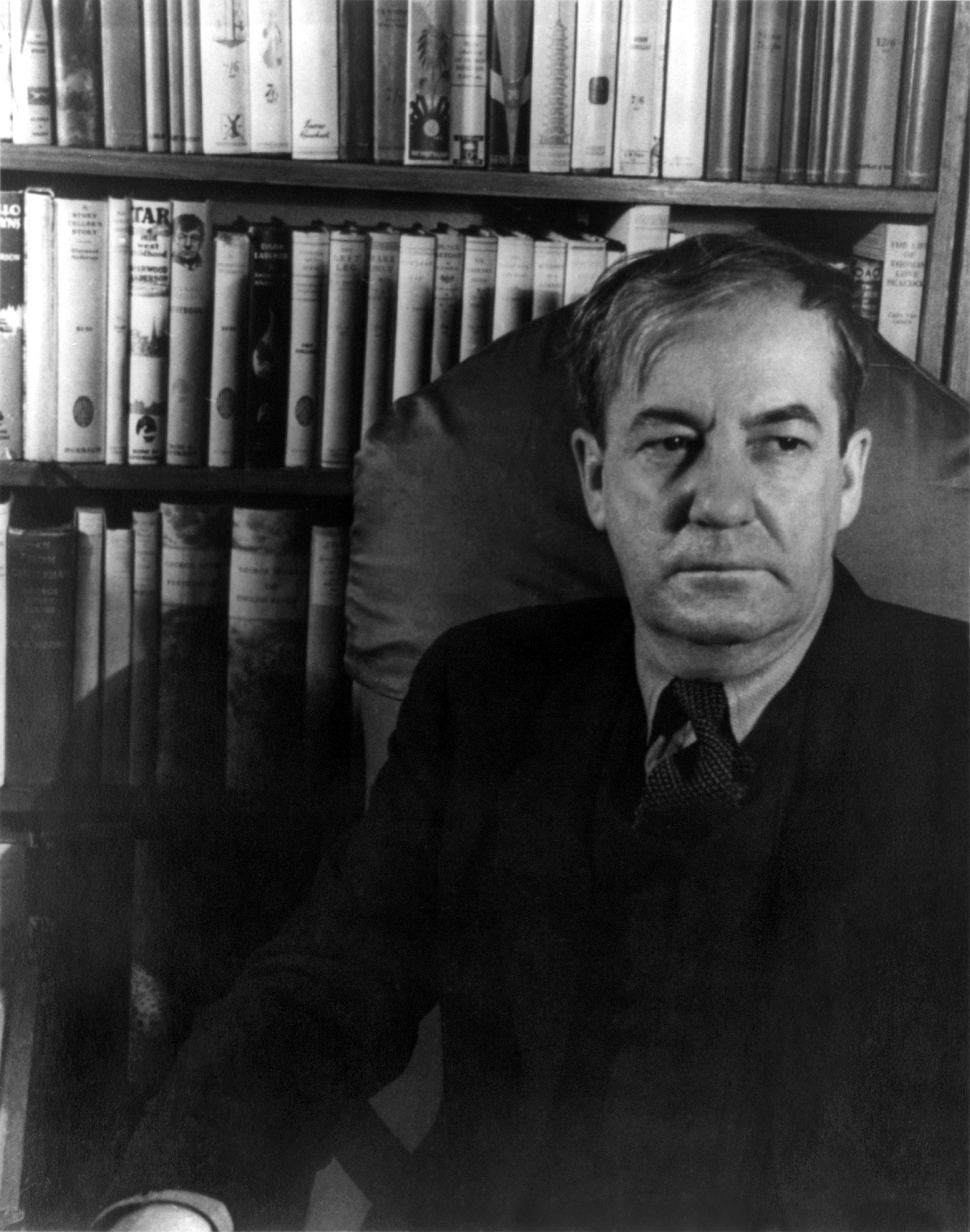
Anderson in 1933

Anderson frequently contributed articles to newspapers. In 1935, he was commissioned to go to Franklin County, Virginia to cover a major federal trial of bootleggers and gangsters, in what was called "The Great Moonshine Conspiracy". More than 30 men had been indicted for trial. In his article, he said Franklin was the "wettest county in the world," a phrase used as a title for a 21st-century novel by Matt Bondurant. In the 1930s, Anderson published Death in the Woods (short stories), Puzzled America (essays), and Kit Brandon: A Portrait (novel). In 1932, Anderson dedicated his novel Beyond Desire to Copenhaver. Although by this time he was considered to be less influential overall in American literature, some of what have become his most quoted passages were published in these later works. The books were otherwise considered inferior to his earlier ones.

Beyond Desire built on his interest in the trade union movement and was set during the 1929 Loray Mill Strike in Gastonia, North Carolina. Hemingway referred to it satirically in his novel, To Have and Have Not (1937), where he included as a minor character an author working on a novel of Gastonia.

In his later years, Anderson and Copenhaver lived on his Ripshin Farm in Troutdale, Virginia, which he purchased in 1927 for use during summers. While living there, he contributed to a country newspaper, columns that were collected and published posthumously.

Just weeks before his death, Anderson started on a radio script for The Free Company, a group of which Anderson was a founding member in early 1941. The Free Company consisted of "a group of prominent writers and Hollywood and stage stars which is presenting a series of thirteen radio plays dealing with Civil Liberties over the Columbia Broadcasting System". Anderson drafted the story titled "Above Suspicion", but died before finishing the radio play. Members of the company completed the script, and produced it May 4, 1941, in tribute to his memory.

== Death ==
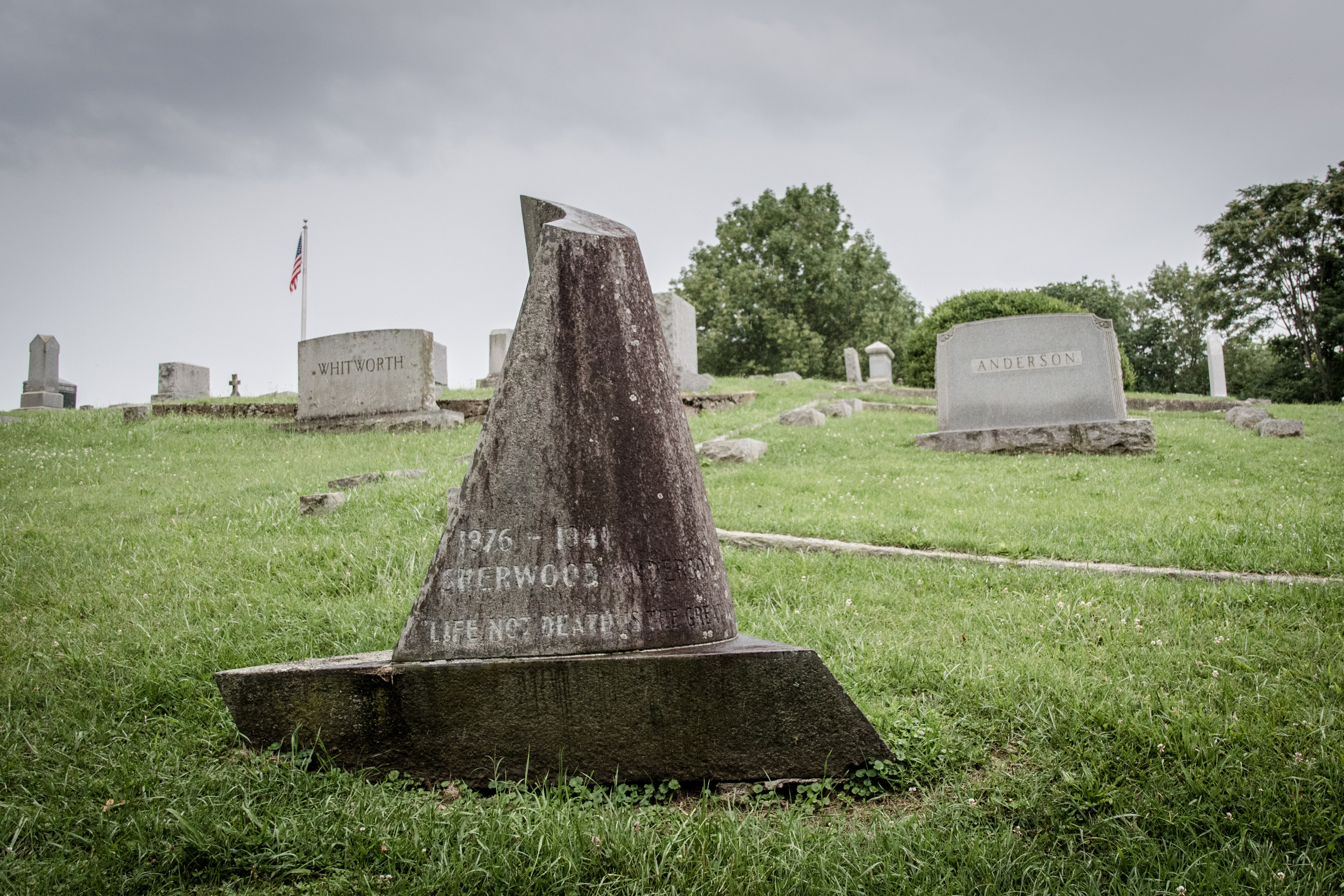
Anderson's grave marker at Round Hill Cemetery in Marion, Virginia. Designed by Wharton Esherick and executed in black granite by Victor Riu.

During a cruise to South America, Anderson had been feeling abdominal discomfort for a few days. He and his wife debarked from the cruise liner Santa Lucia and went to the hospital in Colón, Panama where he died on March 8, 1941, at the age of 64. An autopsy revealed that a swallowed toothpick had done internal damage resulting in peritonitis. Anderson's body was returned to the United States, where he was buried at Round Hill Cemetery in Marion, Virginia. His epitaph reads, "Life, Not Death, Is the Great Adventure".

== Legacy and honors ==
- In 1971, Anderson's final home in Troutdale, Virginia, known as Ripshin Farm, was designated as a National Historic Landmark.
- In 2012, Anderson was inducted into the Chicago Literary Hall of Fame.
- In 1988 the Sherwood Anderson Foundation was created by the author's children and grandchildren. It gives grants to emerging writers. The most notable of these is the annual Sherwood Anderson Foundation Writers Award. As of 2009, the Foundation's co-presidents were Anderson's grandsons David M. Spear and Michael Spear, and Anderson's granddaughter, Karlyn Spear Shankland was Secretary. Also, some great-grandchildren of Anderson served terms in S.A.F. as officers and boardmembers: Tippe Miller, Paul Shankland, Susie Spear, Anna McKean, Margo Ross Sears, Abe Spear.
- In 2008 Philip Roth published the novel Indignation (novel) set in Anderson's Winesburg in the 1950s, with street names and names of other locales taken from Anderson's book. Roth's novel shares some themes with Anderson's Winesburg, Ohio including the main character's alienation and isolation as well as sexual fears.

== Works ==
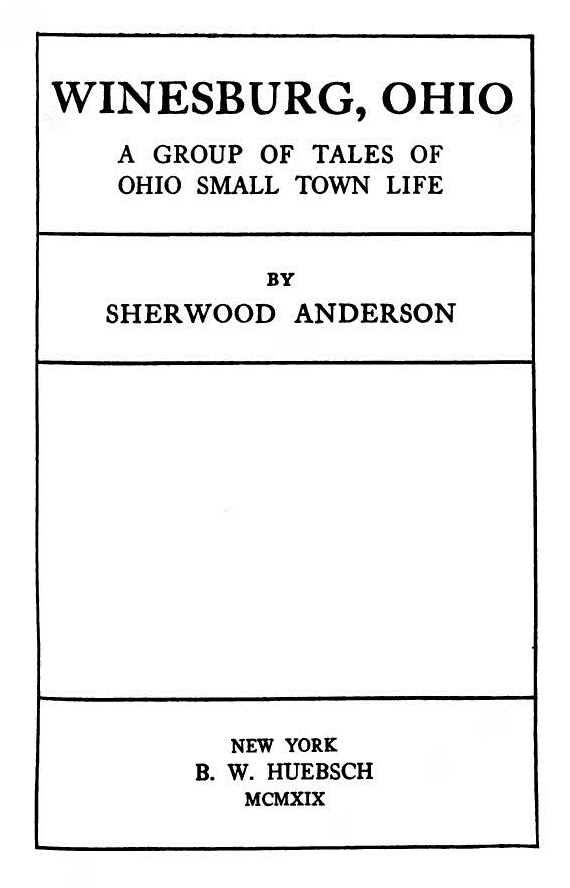
First edition title page of Winesburg, Ohio

=== Novels ===
- Windy McPherson's Son (1916)
- Marching Men (1917)
- Poor White (1920)
- Many Marriages (1923)
- Dark Laughter (1925)
- Tar: A Midwest Childhood (1926, semi-autobiographical novel)
- Beyond Desire (1932)
- Kit Brandon: A Portrait (1936)

=== Short story collections ===
- Winesburg, Ohio (1919)
- The Triumph of the Egg: A Book of Impressions From American Life in Tales and Poems (1921)
- Horses and Men (1923)
- Death in the Woods and Other Stories (1933)

=== Poetry ===
- Mid-American Chants (1918)
- A New Testament (1927)

=== Drama ===
- Plays, Winesburg and Others (1937)

=== Nonfiction ===
- A Story Teller's Story (1922, memoir)
- The Modern Writer (1925, essays)
- Sherwood Anderson's Notebook (1926, memoir)
- Alice and The Lost Novel (1929)
- Hello Towns! (1929, collected newspaper articles)
- Nearer the Grass Roots (1929, essays)
- The American County Fair (1930, essays)
- Perhaps Women (1931, essays)
- No Swank (1934, essays)
- Puzzled America (1935, essays)
- A Writer's Conception of Realism (1939, essays)
- Home Town (1940, photographs and commentary)

=== Published posthumously ===
- Sherwood Anderson's Memoirs (1942)
- The Sherwood Anderson Reader, edited by Paul Rosenfeld (1947)
- The Portable Sherwood Anderson, edited by Horace Gregory (1949)
- Letters of Sherwood Anderson, edited by Howard Mumford Jones and Walter B. Rideout (1953)
- Sherwood Anderson: Short Stories, edited by Maxwell Geismar (1962)
- Return to Winesburg: Selections from Four Years of Writing for a Country Newspaper, edited by Ray Lewis White (1967)
- The Buck Fever Papers, edited by Welford Dunaway Taylor (1971, collected newspaper articles)
- Sherwood Anderson and Gertrude Stein: Correspondence and Personal Essays, edited by Ray Lewis White (1972)
- The "Writer's Book," edited by Martha Mulroy Curry (1975, unpublished works)
- France and Sherwood Anderson: Paris Notebook, 1921, edited by Michael Fanning (1976)
- Sherwood Anderson: The Writer at His Craft, edited by Jack Salzman, David D. Anderson, and Kichinosuke Ohashi (1979)
- A Teller's Tales, selected and introduced by Frank Gado (1983)
- Sherwood Anderson: Selected Letters: 1916–1933, edited by Charles E. Modlin (1984)
- Letters to Bab: Sherwood Anderson to Marietta D. Finely, 1916–1933, edited by William A. Sutton (1985)
- The Sherwood Anderson Diaries, 1936–1941, edited by Hilbert H. Campbell (1987)
- Sherwood Anderson: Early Writings, edited by Ray Lewis White (1989)
- Sherwood Anderson's Love Letters to Eleanor Copenhaver Anderson, edited by Charles E. Modlin (1989)
- Sherwood Anderson's Secret Love Letters, edited by Ray Lewis White (1991)
- Certain Things Last: The Selected Stories of Sherwood Anderson, edited by Charles E. Modlin (1992)
- Southern Odyssey: Selected Writings by Sherwood Anderson, edited by Welford Dunaway Taylor and Charles E. Modlin (1997)
- The Egg and Other Stories, edited with an introduction by Charles E. Modlin (1998)
- Collected Stories, edited by Charles Baxter (2012)

== Sources ==
- Anderson, Elizabeth and Gerald R. Kelly (1969). "Miss Elizabeth". Boston: Little, Brown and Company.
- Anderson, Sherwood (1924). A Story Teller's Story. New York: B.W. Huebsch.
- Anderson, Sherwood (1942). Sherwood Anderson's Memoirs. New York: Harcourt, Brace and Company.
- Anderson, Sherwood (1984). Sherwood Anderson: Selected Letters. Edited by Charles Modlin. Knoxville, TN: Tennessee UP. ISBN 9780870494048
- Anderson, Sherwood (1989). Early Writings. Ed. Ray Lewis White. Kent and London: Kent State UP, 1989. ISBN 0873383745
- Anderson, Sherwood (1991). Sherwood Anderson's Secret Love Letters. Edited by Ray Lewis White. Baton Rouge, LA: LSU Press. ISBN 9780807125021
- Bassett, John Earl (2005). Sherwood Anderson: An American Career. Plainsboro, NJ: Susquehanna UP. ISBN 1-57591-102-7
- Cox, Leland H. Jr. (1980), "Sherwood Anderson", American Writers in Paris, 1920–1939, Dictionary of Literary Biography, vol. 4, Detroit, Mich.: Gale Research Co.
- Daugherty, George H. (December 1948). "Anderson, Advertising Man". The Newberry Library Bulletin. Second Series, No. 2.
- Gold, Herbert (Winter, 1957–1958). "The Purity and Cunning of Sherwood Anderson". The Hudson Review 10 (4): 548–557.
- Howe, Irving (1951). Sherwood Anderson. New York: William Sloane Associates.
- Rideout, Walter B. (2006). Sherwood Anderson: A Writer in America, Volume 1. Madison, WI: University of Wisconsin Press. ISBN 978-0-299-21530-9
- Schevill, James (1951). Sherwood Anderson: His Life and Work. Denver, CO: University of Denver Press.
- Sutton, William A. (1967). Exit to Elsinore. Muncie, IN: Ball State UP.
- Townsend, Kim (1987). Sherwood Anderson: A Biography. Boston: Houghton Mifflin. ISBN 0-395-36533-3
- White, Ray Lewis (1972). "Introduction". in White, Ray Lewis (ed). Marching Men. Cleveland, OH: Case Western Reserve University. ISBN 0-8295-0216-5
