= B. W. Huebsch =

American publisher

Benjamin W. Huebsch
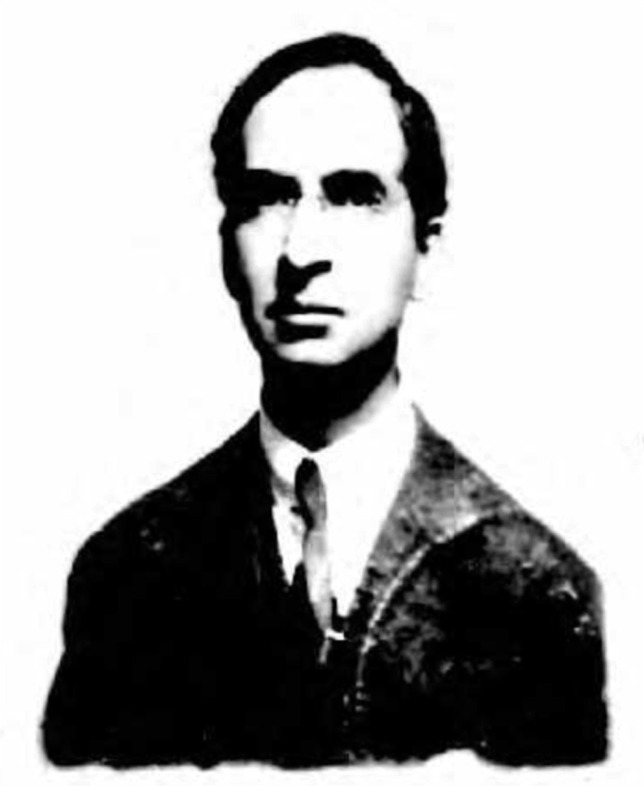
- US Passport Photo 1919
- Born: March 21, 1876; New York City, New York
- Died: August 7, 1964 (aged 88); London, England
- Occupation: Publisher
- Known for: publishing German émigré authors
- Spouse: Alfhild Lamm
- Relatives: Edward Huebsch

Benjamin W. Huebsch (March 21, 1876 – August 7, 1964) was an American publisher in New York City in the early 20th century.

== Background ==
Huebsch was the son of Rabbi Adolphus Huebsch, who had immigrated to the United States from Hungary in 1866 and died in New York, 1884. He played violin and studied under composer and pianist Sam Franko.

== Career ==
Huebsch began work in his older brother's small print shop, which he gradually transformed into a publishing house.

=== B. W. Huebsch (1900–1924) ===
In 1900, Huebsch established the publishing house B. W. Huebsch.

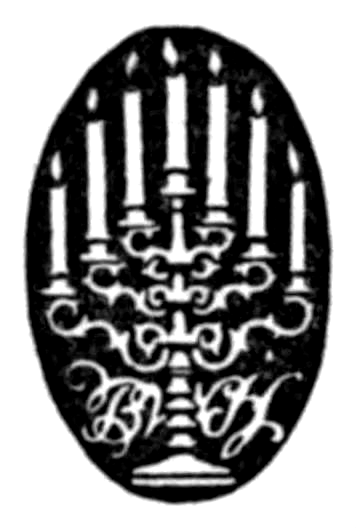
B. W. Huebsch's publishing logo circa 1916 (from James Joyce's Portrait of the Artist as a Young Man

He was the first publisher in the United States of D. H. Lawrence's Sons and Lovers (1913), James Joyce's Dubliners (1916) and Portrait of the Artist as a Young Man (1916), and Sherwood Anderson's Winesburg, Ohio (1919).

In 1914, he published Georges Sorel's Réflexions sur la violence (1908) as Reflections on Violence, translated by T. E. Hulme.

Circa January 1918, B. W. Huebsch published The Poets of Modern France by Ludwig Lewisohn. This is a translation of major French poets into English. Quoting from its preface: "In every age the critical conservatives have protested in the name of eternal principles which, alas, are not eternal at all."

=== The Freeman magazine (1920–1924) ===
Huebsch published The Freeman magazine from 1920 to 1924.

The magazine's co-editors were Francis Neilson (a former British MP) and Albert Jay Nock (a Libertarian whose autobiography Memoirs of a Superfluous Man influenced William F. Buckley Sr. and William F. Buckley Jr. among others). Neilson's wealthy wife, Helen Swift Neilson, financed the magazine.

Contributors included Charles A. Beard, William Henry Chamberlin, Thomas Mann, Lewis Mumford, Bertrand Russell, Lincoln Steffens, Louis Untermeyer, Thorstein Veblen and Suzanne La Follette (the more Libertarian cousin of Senator Robert M. La Follette).

=== Viking Press (1925–1964) ===
In 1925 he merged his publishing house with the Viking Press, where he worked as an editor and vice president.

At Viking, he published numerous German-speaking authors, including: Lion Feuchtwanger, Franz Werfel (though not Werfel's later controversial Class Reunion, published by Simon & Schuster in 1929 and translated by Whittaker Chambers), Arnold Zweig, and Stefan Zweig.

Additional authors he published include Irwin Edman, Rumer Godden, William White, Patrick White.

== Associations ==
Huebsch was a member of the Henry Ford Peace Plan Commission (1915–1916).

He was a signatory member of the Committee of Forty-Eight in 1919. (This was an American liberal political association to create a new political party for social reform in opposition to the increasingly conservatism in both the Republican and Democratic parties. The name reflect the 48 states of the time, as well as the desire for a broad, national movement of moderate progressives. The committee failed to form a third party, despite sympathetic activists from the labor movement in 1920. The "Forty-Eighters") then became constituents in the Conference for Progressive Political Action in 1922, a movement culminating in the independent candidacy of Robert LaFollete for President of the United States in 1924.

He may have been a communist, as some have stated. Diana Trilling wrote in her memoir The Beginning of the Journey (1993) that Huebsch refused to ever republish her husband Lionel Trilling's only novel, The Middle of the Journey (1947) because he was a communist. Whittaker Chambers: A Biography (1997) claims "Unbeknownst to Trilling, Viking's publisher [sic] Ben Huebsch was a Communist and had quietly offered his services to the Hiss defense", based on an unsigned memo dated January 27, 1949, from Meyer Zeligs, further cited by Twilight of the Intellectuals(1999) In 1934, Huebsch did help celebrate the tenth anniversary of Alexander Trachtenberg's International Publishers, the (un)official publisher for the CPUSA—along with other publishers, including Bennet Cerf of Random House, Alfred Knopf of Knopf Publishing, W. W. Norton of W. W. Norton & Company, John Chamberlain of The New York Times, and Lewis Gannett of the Herald Tribune. Huebsch joined the League of American Writers, a Popular Front group organized by the Communist Party in 1935 and disbanded in 1943. (His relative Edward Huebsch was also a member.)

He was a long-time member of P.E.N. and served on numerous boards there.

He began serving as a board member of the American Civil Liberties Union (ACLU) upon its founding by Roger Nash Baldwin and served as its treasurer from 1926 until his death in 1964. (The ACLU supported Free Speech in the U.S., and so would have supported Huebsch's earlier publications of books by Lawrence, Joyce, and Anderson amidst controversial Free Speech issues of the time.)

He represented the book industry on a U.S. National Committee for Unesco in 1949.

He helped establish the National Association of Book Publishers.

== Personal and death ==
In 1920, Huebsch married Alfhild Lamm.

Huebsch had a close relationship with James Joyce, documented in correspondence.

He died in London on August 7, 1964.

== Awards ==
- 1964 - Irita Van Doren Award (first ever)

== Legacy ==
Huebsch's papers are archived at the Library of Congress, with documentation completed in 2013. It contains correspondence with an extraordinary range of writers and intellectuals.

Marshall A. Best started as apprentice to Huebsch at B. W. Huebsch in 1923, right after graduating from Harvard University, continued with Huebsch at Viking Press in 1925, became one of Viking's chief editors and eventually chairman of its executive committee. Best worked with numerous American authors, including Erskine Caldwell (a client of Maxim Lieber), Sheldon Cheney, Malcolm Cowley, Howard Mumford Jones, Rex Stout, Theodore Morrison, Dorothy Parker, Alexander Woollcott, Wallace Stegner, and Lionel Trilling. He also worked with many British authors, including Graham Greene, Rebecca West, Sylvia Townsend Warner, Rumer Godden, and Iris Murdoch. Other authors include R.K. Narayan of India and Patrick White of Australia. With Pascal Covici in 1943, he developed the "Viking Portable Library" and served as its general editor (75 titles of comprehensive anthologies of works by an established author, period, or subject). He also served as treasurer of the American P.E.N. Center. During World War II, he served on the Council on Books in Wartime and the Armed Services Editions.
