= List of fiction set in Chicago =

This is a list of fiction set in or near the city of Chicago.

== Novels ==
Author	Title	Year	Comments
Achy Obejas	Memory Mambo	1996	
Adam Langer	Crossing California	2004	
Adam Langer	The Washington Story	2005	
Adam Selzer	Just Kill Me	2016	
Aden Polydoros	The City Beautiful		
Aleksandar Hemon	Nowhere Man	2002	ISBN 0-375-72702-7
Andy Van Slyke and Rob Rains	The Curse: Cubs Win! Cubs Win! Or Do They?	2010	
Arthur Hailey	Airport	1968	
Audrey Niffenegger	The Time Traveler's Wife	2003	ISBN 0-15-602943-X
Bayo Ojikutu	47th Street Black	2003	ISBN 0-7394-3326-1
Blue Balliett	Chasing Vermeer	2004	
Blue Balliett	The Wright 3	2006	
Bob Hartley	Following Tommy		ISBN 978-0983104186
Bob Hartley	North and Central		ISBN 978-0986092282
Brandy Colbert	The Revolution of Birdie Randolph	2019	
Brandy Colbert	Pointe	2014	
Brian J.P. Doyle	Chicago		ISBN 978-1-25006-199-7
Carolyn Keene	The Case of the Rising Stars	1989	87th volume in the Nancy Drew mystery series
Charles Blackstone	The Week You Weren't Here	2005	
Chloe Neill	Chicagoland Vampires	2009 - 2017	
Chris Ware	Building Stories	2012	
Chris Ware	Jimmy Corrigan, the Smartest Kid on Earth	2000	
Daniel Pinkwater	The Education of Robert Nifkin	1998	Recognizably Chicago, even if never explicitly stated.
Daniel Pinkwater	The Snarkout Boys and The Avocado of Death	1982	Recognizably Chicago, even if never explicitly stated.
Daniel Pinkwater	The Snarkout Boys and the Baconburg Horror	1984	Recognizably Chicago, even if never explicitly stated.
Don De Grazia	American Skin	1998	
Doug Cummings	Deader by the Lake		
Doug Cummings	Every Secret Crime		
Ed Wagemann	The Panty Thief of Bridgeport		
Edna Ferber	So Big	1924	
Elliot Perlman	The Street Sweeper	2012	
Eoin Colfer	Artemis Fowl: The Eternity Code	2003	
Erika Sánchez	I Am Not Your Perfect Mexican Daughter	2017	National Book Award Finalist
Frank Norris	The Pit: A Chicago Story	1903	Set in the wheat speculation trading pits at the Chicago Board of Trade Building
Fredric Brown	The Fabulous Clipjoint	1947	
Graham Masterton	Headlines	1986	
Halle Butler	The New Me	2019	ISBN 978-1474612296
Harry Stephen Keeler	The Riddle of the Traveling Skull	1934	ISBN 1-932416-26-9
James Patterson and David Ellis	The Black Book	2017	ISBN 978-1-4555-4267-3
James T. Farrell	Studs Lonigan trilogy	1932 - 1935	In 1998, the Modern Library ranked the Studs Lonigan trilogy 29th on its list of the 100 best English-language novels of the 20th century.
Jami Attenberg	The Middlesteins	2012	
Jean Toomer	Cane	1923	
Jennette Lee	Mr. Achilles	1912	
Jerry Ahern	The Survivalist Series	1981 - 2019	The early books of the series feature Chicago frequently as the Soviets build their HQ in Chicago, with Varakov setting up his HQ in the Museum of Natural History.
Jim Butcher	The Dresden Files series	2000–present	
Joe Meno	Hairstyles of the Damned	2004	
John Green	An Abundance of Katherines	2006	
John Grisham	The Litigators	2011	(a #1 New York Times Best Seller in 2011)
John M. Ford	The Last Hot Time	2000	ISBN 0-312-87578-9
John Malcolm	Mortal Ruin		ISBN 0-684-18958-5
Joseph G. Peterson	Beautiful Piece	2009	
Joshua Ferris	Then We Came to the End	2007	ISBN 978-0-316-01638-4
Kathy Reichs	206 Bones	2009	
Kevin Gen	Coldren's Prison	2022	ISBN 979-8352373293
Leonard Pitts, Jr.	Grant Park	2015	
Marcus Sakey	The Blade Itself	2007	
Matthew Rettenmund	Boy Culture	1995	
Meyer Levin	Compulsion	1924	Inspired by the real-life Leopold and Loeb trial
Miami Mitch (Glazer)	The Blues Brothers	1980	
Mia P. Manansala	Tita Rosie's Kitchen Mystery series	2021–present	
Mord McGhee	Murder Red Ink	2014	ISBN 978-1501041174
Nella Larsen	Passing	1929	ISBN 0-14-243727-1
Nella Larsen	Quicksand	1928	ISBN 0-14-118127-3
Nelson Algren	The Man With the Golden Arm	1949	ISBN 1-58322-008-9
Paul Krueger	Last Call at the Nightshade Lounge		ISBN 978-1594747595
Peter Cheyney	Dark Hero	1946	
Philip Roth	Letting Go	1962	
Richard Peck	Fair Weather	2001	
Richard Powers	Generosity: An Enhancement	2009	
Richard Wright	Native Son	1940	#20 on Modern Library's 100 Best Novels
Robert Goldsborough	A Death in Pilsen	2007	
Robert Goldsborough	A President in Peril	2009	ISBN 978-1-59080-616-6
Robert Goldsborough	Shadow of the Bomb	2006	
Robert Goldsborough	Terror at the Fair	2011	ISBN 978-1-59080-672-2
Robert Goldsborough	Three Strikes You're Dead	2005	
Robert Shea and Robert Anton Wilson	Illuminatus!	1975	
Robert Wright Campbell	Jimmy Flannery mystery series		
Sandra Cisneros	The House on Mango Street	1984	ISBN 0-679-43335-X
Sara Paretsky	V.I. Warshawski		thrillers featuring private eye V. I. Warshawski, most recently 2020: Overboard
Saul Bellow	Dangling Man	1944	
Saul Bellow	Humboldt's Gift	1975	
Saul Bellow	Ravelstein	2000	
Saul Bellow	The Adventures of Augie March	1953	ISBN 0-14-018941-6
Saul Bellow	The Actual	1997	
Scott Spencer	Endless Love	1979	
Shawn Shiflett	Hey, Liberal!		
Sherwood Anderson	Windy McPherson's Son	1916	
Somerset Maugham	The Razor's Edge	1944	ISBN 1-4000-3420-5
Stuart Dybek	The Coast of Chicago	1990	ISBN 0-312-42425-6
Stuart Dybek	Childhood and Other Neighborhoods	1980	
Stuart Dybek	I Sailed with Magellan	2003	
Terrance L. Smith	The Thief Who Came to Dinner		
Theodore Dreiser	Sister Carrie	1900	ISBN 0-451-52760-7, on Modern Library's 100 Best Novels
Theodore Dreiser	The Titan	1914	
Tim LaHaye and Jerry B. Jenkins	Apollyon	1998	
Tracy Clark	Echo	2025	Third book in Detective Harriet Foster series.
Upton Sinclair	The Jungle	1906	ISBN 1-884365-30-2
Veronica Roth	Divergent	2011	Set in post-apocalyptic Chicago - #1 on the Children's Paperback list in 2012
Veronica Roth	Insurgent	2012	
Veronica Roth	Allegiant	2013	
Ward Just	An Unfinished Season	2004	
Willa Cather	The Song of the Lark	1915	

== Short stories ==
- Chicago Invaded by Hordes of Prehistoric Monsters Dealing Death and Destruction, an anonymous 9000 word short story published by the Chicago Tribune and other newspapers as an April Fools prank in 1906.
- "Deadly City," March, 1953 issue of If magazine under the pseudonym Ivar Jorgensen (later made into the motion picture Target Earth; the story is about an alien invasion and evacuation of Chicago)
- "About Boston" by Ward Just. pp. 12–39 in Legal Fictions edited by Jay Wishingrad, 1992, reprinted from 21 Selected Stories by Just (1990). The story contrasts Boston and Chicago.
- "Big Boy," pp. 97–99 in Me Talk Pretty One Day by David Sedaris begins "It was Easter Sunday in Chicago....", 2000
- Chicago Stories: 40 Dramatic Fictions by Michael Czyzniejewski, Jacob S Knabb and Rob Funderburk, 2012
- The Coast of Chicago: Stories by Stuart Dybek, 2004
- Chicago Style Novella by R. Felini, 2013
- "The Box of Robbers" a fairy tale by Lyman Frank Baum, reprinted in American Fairy Tales by Lyman Frank Baum, English Classical Literature, KAPO, 2015. Original, 1901. ISBN 978-5-9925-1039-3.

== Plays and musicals ==
- American Buffalo
- Be Like Water
- Bleacher Bums
- Chicago - musical, nominated for ten Tony Awards in 1976
- Chicago - play
- Clybourne Park
- Do Black Patent Leather Shoes Really Reflect Up?
- The Front Page
- Glengarry Glen Ross
- Happy End
- In the Jungle of Cities
- Ma Rainey's Black Bottom
- Mean Girls - musical, nominated for 12 Tony Awards in 2018
- Proof
- A Raisin in the Sun - nominated for four Tony Awards in 1960
- The Resistible Rise of Arturo Ui
- Sexual Perversity in Chicago
- Show Boat
- Superior Donuts

== Films ==
- About Last Night (1986)
- Above the Law (1988)
- The Accountant (2016) - partly in Chicago (box office #1 film in the U.S.)
- Adventures in Babysitting (1987)
- The Adventures of Lucky Pierre (1961)
- Against All Hope (1982)
- Air (2023)
- Al Capone (1959) (mob film)
- Ali (2001)
- Allah Tantou (1989)
- American Gun (2005)
- American Reel (1999)
- Angel Eyes (2001)
- Anything's Possible (1999)
- April Fools (2007)
- Archive (2020)
- August Rush (2007)
- The Babe (1992)
- Baby on Board (2009)
- Baby's Day Out (1994)
- Backdraft (1991) (box office #1 film in the U.S.)
- Bad Boys (1983)
- Barbershop (2002) (box office #1 film in the U.S.)
- Barbershop 2: Back in Business (2004) (#1 film in U.S.)
- Barbershop: The Next Cut (2016)
- Batman (1989)
- The Batman (2022)
- Batman Begins (2005)
- Batman: Gotham Knight (2008)
- Batman v Superman: Dawn of Justice (2016)
- Beats (2019)
- Beginning of the End (1957) – set in downstate Illinois and Chicago
- Betrayed (1988)
- The Big Brawl (1980)
- Big Shots (1987)
- Blankman (1994)
- Blind (1994)
- Blink (1994)
- The Blues Brothers (1980)
- Blues Brothers 2000 (1998)
- The Boss (2016) (#1 film in U.S.)
- Brannigan (1975)
- The Break-Up (2006) (#1 in the U.S.)
- The Breakfast Club (1985)
- Breed of Men (1919)
- Bridesmaids (2011) (partly in Chicago)
- Bridge (1988)
- The Brute (1920)
- Bugsy Malone (1976) (partly in Chicago) (mob film)
- Butterfly on a Wheel (2007)
- Call Northside 777 (1948)
- Candyman (1992) - based on a book originally set in Liverpool
- Candyman (2021), sequel to the original, (box office #1 film in the U.S.)
- Capone (1975) (mob film)
- Carrie (1952)
- Casino (1995) - scenes labeled as "Back Home" are in Chicago (mob film)
- Category 6: Day of Destruction (2004) - partly in Chicago (CBS mini series)
- Chain Reaction (1996)
- Chicago (1927)
- Chicago (2002) (Academy Award for Best Picture)
- Chicago Cab (1997)
- Chicago Deadline (1949) (film noir)
- Chicago Overcoat (2009) (mob film)
- Child's Play (1988) (#1 in U.S.)
- Child's Play 2 (1990) (#1 in U.S.)
- Chi-Raq (2015)
- Christmas...Again?! (2021)
- City That Never Sleeps (1953) (film noir)
- Class (1983)
- Code of Silence (1985)
- Colombiana (2011)
- The Company (2003)
- Continental Divide (1981)
- Cooley High (1975)
- Curly Sue (1991)
- Damien: Omen II (1978) (#1 film in the U.S.)
- Danger Lights (1930) (partly in Chicago)
- The Dark Knight (2008) (#1 film in the U.S.)
- The Dark Knight Rises (2012)
- Death of a President (2006)
- Death Wish (2018)
- Dhoom 3 (2013) (Hindi film)
- The Dilemma (2011)
- Divergent (2014) (box office #1 film in the U.S.)
- The Divergent Series: Insurgent (2015) (#1 in the U.S.)
- Derailed (2005)
- Dick Tracy (1990)
- Dragonfly (2002)
- The Dumb Girl of Portici (1916)
- Eagle Eye (2008) (#1 film in U.S.)
- Eight Men Out (1988)
- The Express: The Ernie Davis Story (2009)
- Ferris Bueller's Day Off (1986)
- Flatliners (1990)
- The Flash (2023)
- The Fugitive (1993) (#1 film in the U.S.)
- The Fury (1978)
- Girls Just Want to Have Fun (1985)
- Go Fish (1994)
- The Great Ziegfeld (1936)
- The Grudge 2 (2006) (#1 film in U.S.)
- The Grudge 3 (2009)
- Guilty as Sin (1993)
- Hardball (2001) (#1 film in U.S.)
- Harry and Tonto (1974)
- Heaven is a Playground (1991)
- Henry: Portrait of a Serial Killer (1986) - partly in Chicago
- Hero (1992)
- High Fidelity (2000) - based on a book originally set in London
- His New Job (1915)
- Home Alone (1990) (set in Chicago suburb Winnetka; #1 film in the U.S.)
- Home Alone 2: Lost in New York (1992) (partly in Chicago) (#1 film in U.S.)
- Home Alone 3 (1997)
- The Homesteader (1919)
- Hoodlum (1997)
- Hope Floats (1998) - partly in Chicago
- The Hunter (1980) - partly in Chicago
- I Love Trouble (1994)
- I, Robot (2004) (#1 in U.S.)
- I Want Someone to Eat Cheese With (2007)
- In the Depth of Our Hearts (1920)
- It's the Rage (1999)
- Judgment Night (1993)
- Jupiter Ascending (2015) directed by the Wachowskis
- Just Visiting (2001)
- Justice League (2021)
- King of the Rodeo (1929)
- Kissing A Fool (1998)
- Kong: Skull Island (2017) (#1 in U.S.)
- The Lake House (2006)
- A League of Their Own (1992) (#1 in the U.S.)
- Light It Up (1999)
- Little Fockers (2010) (#1 in the U.S.)
- Looking for Mr. Goodbar (1977)
- Love and Action in Chicago (1999)
- Love Jones (1997)
- Love Language (2026)
- Lucas (1986)
- Man of Steel (2013)
- The Man with the Golden Arm (1955)
- Mean Girls (2004) (#1 film in U.S.) - set in Evanston
- Medium Cool (1969)
- Meet the Parents (2000) (#1 in the U.S.) - partly set in Chicago
- Mercury Rising (1998)
- Message in a Bottle - partly set in Chicago
- Michael (1996) - partly in Chicago (#1 film in U.S.)
- Mickey One (1965)
- Midnight Run (1988) - partly in Chicago (mob film)
- Miracle on 34th Street (1994) - partly in Chicago
- Mission Impossible (1996)
- Mo' Money (1992)
- The Monkey Hustle (1976)
- Music Box (1989)
- My Best Friend's Wedding (1997)
- My Big Fat Greek Wedding (2002)
- My Bodyguard (1980)
- National Lampoon's Christmas Vacation (1989) (#1 film in U.S.)
- National Lampoon's European Vacation (1985) - starts in Chicago
- National Lampoon's Vacation (1983) - partly in Chicago (#1 film in U.S.)
- Natural Born Killers (1994) - partly in Chicago
- The Negotiator (1998)
- Never Been Kissed (1999)
- Next of Kin (1989) - set in Chicago and Kentucky (mob film)
- A Night in the Life of Jimmy Reardon (1988)
- Nothing in Common (1986) - partly in Chicago
- Office Christmas Party (2016)
- On the Line (2001)
- Only the Lonely (1991)
- Opportunity Knocks (1990)
- Ordinary People (1980) (Academy Award for Best Picture)
- The Package (1989)
- Planes, Trains & Automobiles (1987)
- Poltergeist III (1988)
- Prelude to a Kiss (1992)
- Primal Fear (1996)
- Prime Cut (1972) – set in Chicago and in Kansas City, Kansas
- The Princess Bride (1987) (Modern Scenes set in Evanston, Illinois)
- Prodigal Girl (2016), also called Trust Fund)
- Proof (2005)
- The Public Enemy (1931) (mob film)
- Public Enemies (neo-noir, mob film) (2009)
- Raisin in the Sun (1961)
- Rampage (2018)
- Random Encounter (1998)
- Rapid Fire (1992)
- Raw Deal (1986)
- The Razor's Edge (1946) - based on Maughaum's novel of the same title
- Red Heat (1988)
- The Relic (1997) - based on a book originally set in New York City (#1 film in the U.S.)
- Return to Me (2000)
- Ri¢hie Ri¢h (1994) - scenes filmed in Chicago
- Risky Business (1983) - set in the North Shore
- Road to Perdition (2002) (#1 film in the U.S.) (mob film)
- Robin and the 7 Hoods (1964)
- Roll Bounce (2005)
- Rookie of the Year (1993)
- Running Scared (1986)
- The St. Valentine's Day Massacre (1967) (mob film)
- Save the Last Dance (2001) (#1 film in the U.S.)
- Scarface (1932) (mob film)
- Scooby-Doo! Stage Fright (2013)
- Shall We Dance? (2004)
- Sheba, Baby (1975) - partly in Chicago
- She's Having a Baby (1988)
- Silver Streak (1976) - partly in Chicago
- Sleepless In Seattle (1993) - partly in Chicago
- Slim (1937) - partly in Chicago
- Some Like It Hot (1959) - partly in Chicago (mob film)
- Somewhere in Time (1980) - partly in Chicago
- Soul Food (1997)
- A Sound of Thunder (2005)
- Source Code (2011)
- Spider-Man 2 (2004) (#1 film in U.S.) - partly in Chicago
- The Sting (1973) - partly in Chicago; Academy Award for Best Picture (mob film)
- Stir of Echoes (1999)
- Stolen Summer (2001)
- Straight Talk (1992)
- Stranger than Fiction (2006)
- Strawberry Fields (1997)
- Streets of Fire (1984)
- Suicide Squad (2016)
- Surviving Christmas (2003)
- That Royle Girl (1925)
- Thief (1981)
- The Thief Who Came to Dinner (1973)
- Three to Tango (1999)
- Tommy Boy (1995) (#1 film in U.S.) - partly in Chicago and Wisconsin
- Transformers: Dark of the Moon (2011) (#1 film in U.S.)
- Transformers: Age of Extinction (2014) (#1 in the U.S.)
- Transformers: The Last Knight (2017) (#1 in the U.S.)
- Two Fathers: Justice for the Innocent (1994)
- Ultraviolet (2006)
- The Unborn (2009)
- Uncle Buck (1989) (#1 film in U.S.)
- The Untouchables (1987) (mob film)
- U.S. Marshals (1998) - partly in Chicago
- Vegas Vacation (1997) - starts in Chicago
- V.I. Warshawski (1991)
- Wanted (2008)
- The Watcher (2000) (#1 in the U.S.)
- Wayne's World (1992) (#1 film in the U.S.) - partly in Chicago and the suburb Aurora
- Wayne's World 2 (1993) (#1 in the U.S.) - partly in Chicago
- We Grown Now (2024)
- The Weather Man (2005)
- A Wedding (1978)
- What Women Want (2000) (#1 in the U.S.)
- When Harry Met Sally... (1989) - partly in Chicago
- While You Were Sleeping (1995) (#1 in the U.S.)
- The Whole Nine Yards (2000) (#1 in the U.S.)
- Wicker Park (2004)
- Wildcats (1986)
- Within Our Gates (1920)

Although not set in the city's limits, the John Hughes directed films Sixteen Candles, The Breakfast Club, Pretty in Pink (1986) (#1 film in U.S.), and Weird Science take place in the fictional town of Shermer, Illinois, which is based on Northbrook, Illinois. A scene of Weird Science was filmed at Northbrook Court mall.

In The Matrix (1999, directed by the Wachowskis from Chicago), the subway sets were based on the CTA. One of the trains is clearly a Brown Line train, which in reality, barring construction, never goes underground.

=== Chicago destroyed on film ===
- In Old Chicago (1938) - destroyed by the Great Chicago Fire
- Beginning of the End (1957) - city attacked by giant mutant grasshoppers
- Independence Day (1996) - mentioned
- Chain Reaction (1996) - parts of the city destroyed by an explosion caused by a hydrogen reactor
- Category 6: Day of Destruction (2004) - destroyed by a series of tornadoes and a category 6 hurricane over the Great Lakes
- Transformers: Dark of the Moon (2011) - seriously damaged by the Decepticons' assault on the city as well as the final battle between the Autobots and Decepticons (#1 film in U.S.)
- Transformers: Age of Extinction (2014) - the city was rebuilt five years later, where it was used for KSI first (#1 in U.S.)

== Music videos ==
- "Hard to Handle" by Black Crowes 1990, blues rock
- "Jam" 1992, by Michael Jackson from Gary, he plays Michael Jordan in an abandoned indoor basketball court
- "I Used to Love H.E.R." by Common (rapper) 1994, shows clips from the Southside, jazz rap
- "I'll be Missing You" by Puff Daddy 1997, filmed at the United Terminal at O'Hare Airport
- "Cha Cha Slide" by Chicago's DJ Casper 2000, shows the Marina City towers; house and hip hop
- "I Wish" by R. Kelly 2001, nominated for Best R&B Video at the 2001 MTV Video Music Awards, video start shows the "L" train
- "The Game of Love" by Santana feat. Michelle Branch 2002, filmed in Pilsen
- "Step in the Name of Love" by R. Kelly 2003, filmed on a yacht on Lake Michigan
- "Lyric (song)" by Zwan (Billy Corgan) 2003
- "Overnight Celebrity by Twista feat. Kanye West 2004, video has cameos by Chicago rappers like Da Brat, shows Chicago landmark buildings like the Tribune Tower
- "The Corner (song)" by Common (rapper) feat. Kanye West 2005, video start shows Navy Pier by a frozen Lake Michigan, song is about Chicago
- "Give It All" by Rise Against 2005, they have a mosh pit inside an "L" train
- "Swing Life Away" by Rise Against 2005, video start shows the "L" train
- "Kick Push" by Lupe Fiasco 2006, video shows skateboarding in the city
- "Homecoming" by Kanye West feat Chris Martin of Coldplay 2008, nominated for Best Hip-Hop Video at the 2008 MTV Video Music Awards, video shows the Millennium Park "bean", Cloud Gate, song is about Chicago
- "Re-Education (Through Labor)" by Rise Against 2008
- "You Found Me" by The Fray 2009, filmed on top of skyscrapers
- "The video for 'Zawsze Tam Gdzie Ty', one of Polish rock band Lady Pank greatest hits is set on Chicago's 'L', the Quincy Station in particular. Directed by Tom Kuznar.
- "1,2,3,4" by Plain White T's 2009, on the VH1 Top 40 Videos of 2009
- "Angels" by Chance the Rapper feat Saba (rapper) 2016, nominated for Best Hip-Hop Video at the 2016 MTV Video Music Awards, video shows Chance rapping on top of the "L" train
- "City in a Garden" by Fall Out Boy 2018, shows Wrigley Field and other city landmarks, song is about Chicago

== Television shows ==
- 61st Street (2022)
- 100 Days of Summer (2014)
- According to Jim (2001–2009). ABC
- Against the Wall (2011)
- Animaniacs (2020)
- Barbershop: The Series (2005)
- Batman: The Animated Series (1992–1995)
- Batwoman (2019–2022)
- The Bear (2022–) Hulu
- The Beast (2009)
- Betrayal (2013–2014)
- Better than Us (2018–2019)
- Biker Mice from Mars (1993–1996)
- Biker Mice from Mars (2006)
- The Bob Newhart Show (1972–1978). CBS
- The Boondocks (2005–2014) Adult Swim
- Boss (2011–2012)
- Buck Rogers in the 25th Century (1979–1981) - in its first season (1979–1980), "New Chicago" functioned as Earth's capital city
- The Building (1993)
- The Casagrandes (2019–2022) - as the "Great Lakes City"
- Charlie & Co. (1985–1986)
- The Chicago Code (2011) Billy Corgan did the theme song. FOX
- Chicago Fire (2012–present). NBC
- Chicago Hope (1994–2000). Emmy-winner for Mandy Patinkin. CBS
- Chicago Med (2015–present). NBC
- Chicago P.D. (2014–present). NBC
- Chicago Party Aunt (2021). Netflix, animated
- Chicago Sons (1997)
- Chicago Story (1982)
- Coupling (2003) - US version only
- The Conners (2018-) (Lanford) - a sequel spin-off of Roseanne.
- The Crazy Ones (2013–2014) with Robin Williams. CBS
- Crime Story (1986–1988)
- Crisis (2014)
- Cupid (1998)
- Defiance (2013–2015)
- The Dresden Files (2007)
- Due South (1994–1996, 1997–1999) - some filming in Toronto, Canada
- Early Edition (1996–2000)
- Easy (2016)
- E/R (1984–1985)
- ER (1994–2009). Won 23 Emmy Awards. Most nominated drama show ever. NBC
- Exosquad (1993–1995) - Chicago, renamed to Phaeton City, was one of the central locations of the show
- Family Matters (1989–1998) Emmy-nominated. ABC
- The Flash (2014–2023)
- The Forgotten (2009–2010). ABC
- Generations (1989–1991). NBC
- The Girlfriend Experience (2016) Starz
- The Good Fight (2017–present) CBS All Access/Paramount Plus
- Good Times (1974–1979) Golden Globe nominated. CBS
- The Good Wife (2009–2016) 5-time Emmy winner for Julianna Margulies. CBS
- Gotham (2014–2019)
- Happy Endings (2011–2013)
- Hell on Wheels (2011–2016)
- The Hogan Family (1986–1991)
- Humans (2015–2018)
- I Didn't Do It (2014–2015)
- It Takes Two (1982–1983). ABC
- Invincible (2021–present)
- Ironheart (2025-)
- Kenan & Kel (1996–2000) on Nickelodeon
- Kolchak: The Night Stalker (1974–1975)
- Lady Blue (1985–1986)
- The League (2009–2015)
- Legally Mad (2009)
- Leverage (2008–2012) - pilot episode only
- Life Goes On (1989–1993)
- Life With Bonnie (2002–2004)
- The Loop (2006–2007)
- Lovecraft Country (2021)
- M Squad (1957–1960)
- Married... with Children (1987–1997). FOX
- The Man in the High Castle (2015–2019)
- Mike and Molly (2010–2016) Emmy winner in 2011 for Melissa McCarthy. CBS
- Mind Games (2014)
- Modern Men (2006)
- Moon Knight (2022)
- My Boys (2006–2010)
- Milagros de Navidad (2017). Telemundo
- Night Sky (2022)
- Ozark (2017-2022) - Begins in Chicago and later returns for an eispode.
- Pantheon (2022)
- Paper Girls (2022)
- Pepper Dennis (2006)
- Perfect Strangers (1986–1993)
- The Playboy Club (2011)
- Postcards from Buster (2004–2012) - One episode set in Chicago, also where Buster Baxter and his dad ride a CTA Brown Line train in the theme song.
- The Real O'Neals (2016)
- Prison Break (2005–2009) - partly set in Chicago
- Punky Brewster (1984–1986). NBC
- Punky Brewster (2021), Peacock
- Raven's Home (2017–present) - Seasons 1-4 are set in Chicago.
- Revolution (2012–2014)
- Roseanne (1988-1997, 2018) (Lanford)
- Samantha Who? (2007–2009)
- The Santa Clauses (2022–present)
- Saturdays (2023)
- Sense8 (2015–2018) Netflix (directed by the Wachowskis)
- Shake It Up (2010–2013) Disney Channel
- Shameless (2011–2021) Emmy-winner in 2015 for Joan Cusack. Showtime
- Shining Girls (2022–present)
- Sirens (2014–2015)
- Sisters (1991–1996)
- Skull Island (2023–present)
- Soul Food: The Series (2000–2004). Emmy-nominated. Showtime
- South Side (2019–2021). Comedy Central/HBO Max
- Special Unit 2 (2001–2002)
- Starting Over (2003–2004 season)
- Station Eleven (2021–2022) HBO Max
- The Steve Harvey Show (1996–2002). The WB
- Still Standing (2002–2006). CBS
- Superman & Lois (2021–)
- Supernatural (2005-2020)
- Terra Nova (2011)
- The Time Traveler’s Wife (2022)
- Traffic Light (2011)
- Trust Me (2009)
- Turks (1999)
- Two of a Kind (1998–1999). ABC
- The Untouchables (1959–1963) Emmy winner. ABC
- Webster (1983–1987)
- What About Joan? (2001)
- Whitney (2011–2013)
- Wild Card (2003–2005)

=== Reality TV ===
- The Real World: Chicago (2002)
- Real World: Skeletons (2014–2015)

== Video games ==
This is a list of video games in which a major part of the action takes place in the city. This list does not count sports games or flight simulators, save for Pilotwings 64 and Tom Clancy's H.A.W.X.

- 18 Wheels of Steel series
- BattleTanx
- Ben 10: Protector of Earth
- Blues Brothers 2000
- The Bureau: XCOM Declassified
- Call of Duty: Infinite Warfare
- Call of Duty Modern Warfare II
- Chicago 90
- Chicago 1930
- Chicago Enforcer
- Chicago Syndicate
- The Crew
- Crimson Skies: High Road to Revenge
- Cruisin' USA
- The Dark Pictures Anthology: The Devil in Me
- Deus Ex: Invisible War
- Driver 2
- Emergency Call Ambulance
- Empire of Sin
- Grid 2
- Grid Autosport
- Grid Legends
- Hitman: Absolution
- Lethal Enforcers
- Michael Jordan in Chaos in the Windy City
- Midtown Madness
- Mob Enforcer
- Need for Speed: ProStreet
- Need for Speed: The Run
- Need for Speed Unbound
- Nocturne
- Perfect Dark
- Pilotwings 64
- Project Gotham Racing 2
- Rampage 2: Universal Tour
- Rampage: Total Destruction
- Rampage World Tour
- Resistance 2
- Shadow Hearts: From the New World
- Still Life
- Still Life 2
- Stranglehold
- Stuntman: Ignition
- Tekken
- TimeSplitters 2
- Tom Clancy's H.A.W.X.
- Tom Clancy's Splinter Cell: Blacklist
- Tony Hawk's Pro Skater 4
- Wanted: Weapons of Fate
- Watch Dogs
- We Are Chicago
- Wolfenstein II: The New Colossus

== Comics, manga, and cartoons ==
- Biker Mice from Mars
- Blue Beetle
- Bojack Horseman Season 6 splits time, with much of the season taking place in Chicago
- Cage, volume 1 (April 1992-November 1993) - ongoing series by Marvel Comics featuring the superhero Luke Cage; 20 issues were published
- C.O.W.L.
- Ghost
- Gunsmith Cats
- Kremin 1-4 Grey Productions Inc 1991-1992
- Nightwing Vol 3., Issue #18-ongoing
- Plastic Man (DC)
- Riding Bean
- Savage Dragon
- Tintin in America

=== Miniseries, specials or individual episodes ===
- Agents of S.H.I.E.L.D.
  - "The End"
- Ben 10
  - "Monster Weather"
- The Legend of Tarzan
  - "The Mysterious Visitor"
- Danger Rangers
  - "Fires and Liars"
- Scooby-Doo and Guess Who?
  - "The Hot Dog Dog!"
- Godzilla vs. America
  - Godzilla: Chicago This upcoming issue will feature Toho's Godzilla attacking Chicago.

== See also ==
- Chicago literature
- List of songs about Chicago
