= Chicago literature =

Writing that reflects the culture of the city

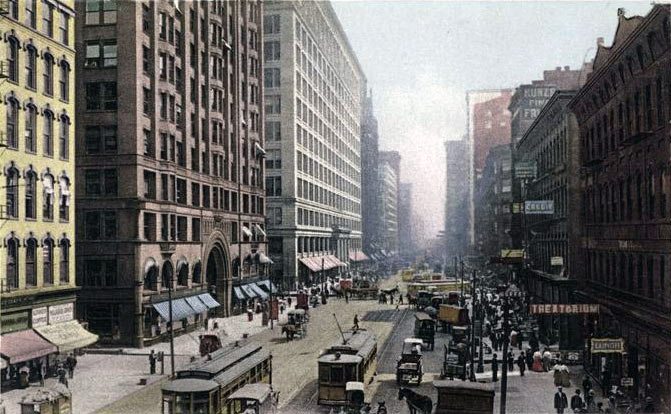
State Street around the turn of the 20th century, the period of one of the major waves of Chicago literature

Chicago literature is writing, primarily by writers born or living in Chicago, that reflects the culture of the city.

== Themes and movements ==
James Atlas, in his biography of Chicago writer Saul Bellow, suggests that "the city's reputation for nurturing literary and intellectual talent can be traced to the same geographical centrality that made it a great industrial power." When Chicago was incorporated in 1837, it was a frontier outpost with about 4,000 people. The population rose rapidly to approximately 100,000 in 1860. By 1890, the city had over 1 million people. Chicago's dynamic growth, as well as the manufacturing, economics, and politics that fueled this growth, can be seen in the works of writers like Carl Sandburg, Theodore Dreiser, Sherwood Anderson, Hamlin Garland, Frank Norris, Upton Sinclair, Willa Cather, and Edna Ferber.

Due to these rapid changes, Chicago writers of the late nineteenth and early twentieth centuries faced the challenge of how to depict this potentially disorienting new urban reality. Narrative fiction of that time, much of it in the style of "high-flown romance" and "genteel realism", needed a new approach to describe Chicago's social, political, and economic conditions. Chicagoans worked hard to create a literary tradition that would stand the test of time, and create a "city of feeling" out of concrete, steel, vast lake, and open prairie. Among the new techniques and styles embraced by Chicago writers were "naturalism", "imagism", and "free verse". Themes often centered on an exciting but dirty urbanism, as well as the quaint but dark and sometimes stultifying small town.

Chicago's early twentieth-century writers and publishers were seen as producing innovative work that broke with the literary traditions of Europe and the Eastern United States. In 1920, the critic H. L. Mencken wrote in a London magazine, The Nation, that Chicago was the "Literary Capital of the United States". Expressing the attitude that Chicago writers were creating a distinctive, new, and far from genteel literary idiom, he wrote, "Find a writer who is indubitably an American in every pulse-beat, snort, and adenoid, an American who has something new and peculiarly American to say and who says it in an unmistakable American way, and nine times out of ten you will find that he has some sort of connection with the gargantuan and inordinate abattoir by Lake Michigan."

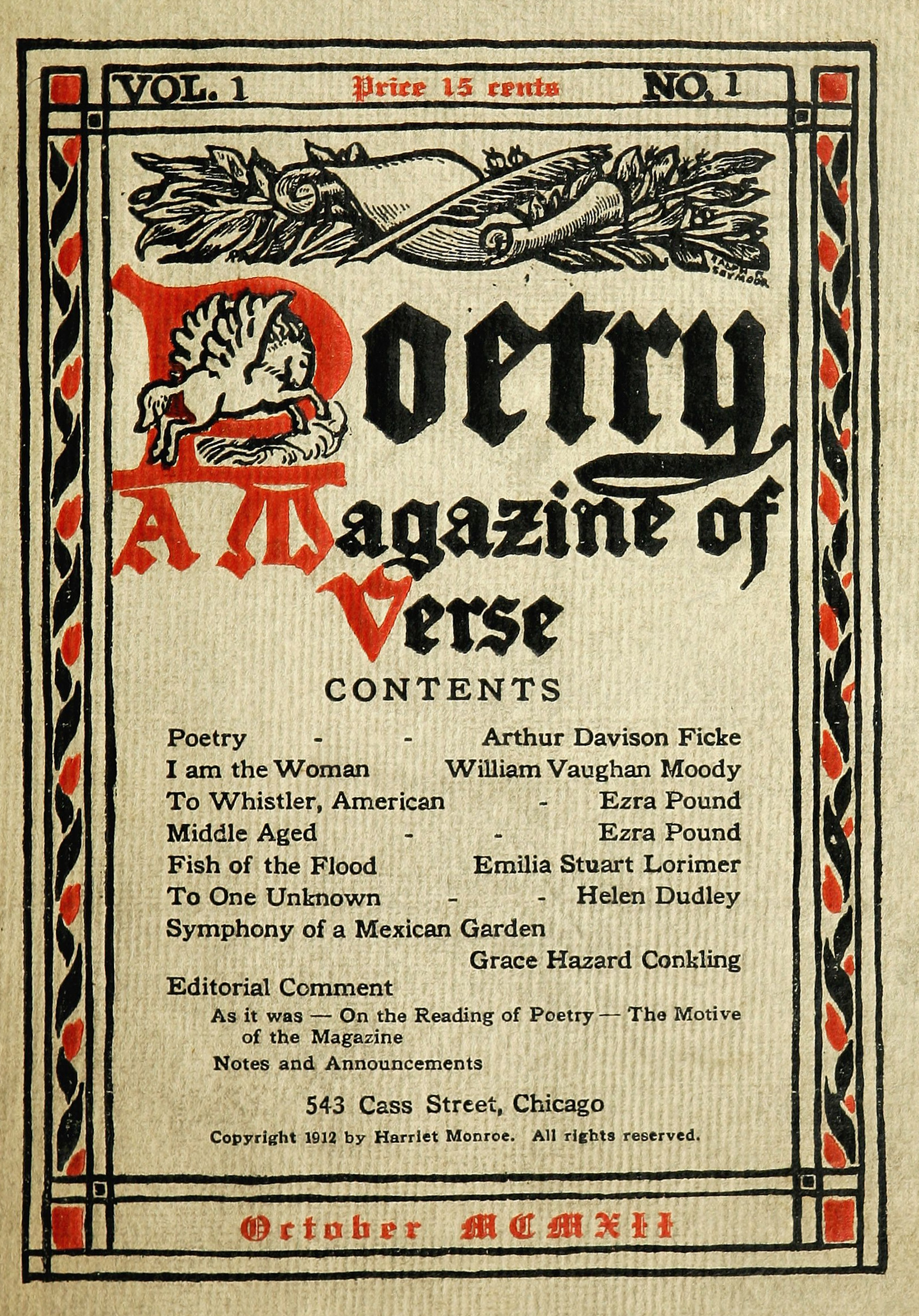
The first issue of Chicago-based Poetry magazine appeared in 1912.

While Chicago produced much realist and naturalist fiction, its literary institutions also played a crucial role in promoting international modernism. The avant-garde Little Review (founded 1914 by Margaret Anderson) began in Chicago, though it later moved elsewhere. The Little Review provided an important platform for experimental literature, famously it was the first to publish James Joyce's novel Ulysses, in serial form until the magazine was forced to discontinue the novel due to obscenity charges. Similarly, the publication that became Poetry magazine (founded 1912 by Harriet Monroe) was instrumental in launching the Imagist and Objectivist poetic movements. T. S. Eliot's first professionally published poem, "The Love Song of J. Alfred Prufrock", appeared in Poetry. Contributors have included Ezra Pound, W. B. Yeats, William Carlos Williams, Langston Hughes and Carl Sandburg, among others. The magazine also discovered such poets as Gwendolyn Brooks, James Merrill, and John Ashbery. Poetry and the Little Review were "daring" in their editorial championship of the modernist movement. Later editors also made substantial contributions in poetry, as did Chicago's university and performance venues.

Chicago's universities also have a strong reputation for developing literary talent. In the second half of the 20th century, the University of Chicago served as a hub for many emerging postmodern writers such as Saul Bellow, Kurt Vonnegut, Philip Roth, and Robert Coover. Bellow received his Bachelor's from nearby Northwestern University, which has also produced acclaimed authors such as George R.R. Martin, Tina Rosenberg and Kate Walbert.

Today, Chicago is home to the world's largest youth poetry festival, Louder Than a Bomb. Since its founding in 2001, Louder Than a Bomb has grown into a multi-week celebration that includes competitions, workshops, and other poetry-related events. By 2018, the festival was drawing over 100 teams for a total of more than 1000 young poets competing in spoken word tournaments. The festival is credited with influencing contemporary Chicago poets like Nate Marshall and José Olivarez.

According to Bill Savage in The Encyclopedia of Chicago, today's Chicago writers are still interested in the same social themes and urban landscapes that compelled earlier Chicago writers: "the fundamental dilemmas presented by city life in general and by the specifics of Chicago's urban spaces, history, and relentless change."

== Periodization ==
The Encyclopedia of Chicago identifies three periods of works from Chicago which had a major influence on American Literature:

- A period around the turn of the 20th century, which featured "Midland realism" of authors such as Henry Blake Fuller, Theodore Dreiser and Eugene Field;
- A period in the 1910s and 1920s in which literary works were published by newspapers and new literary magazines based in Chicago. Sometimes called the "Chicago Renaissance" which includes the later works of Dreiser and the work of authors such as Sherwood Anderson, Floyd Dell, Carl Sandburg, Harriet Monroe, and Margaret Anderson.
- A period in the 1940s featuring what it calls "neighborhood novels". Authors in this period include James T. Farrell, Richard Wright, Gwendolyn Brooks and Saul Bellow.

Literature scholar Robert Bone argues for the existence of an overlapping fourth period:

- A second "Chicago Renaissance", this time lasting approximately 1935 to 1950 and referring to a wave of creativity from Chicago's African American writers. Bone suggests that this Chicago Renaissance was comparable in influence and importance to the earlier Harlem Renaissance. Bone's list of Chicago Renaissance writers includes fiction writers like Richard Wright, William Attaway, and Willard Motley along with poets like Frank Marshall Davis and Margaret Walker. The term "Chicago Black Renaissance" is often used to denote creativity in all the arts, not just in literature, during the 1930s–1950s.

== Works about Chicago or set in Chicago ==
Much notable Chicago writing focuses on the city itself, with social criticism keeping exultation in check. Here is a selection of Chicago's most famous works about itself:

=== Fiction, drama, and poetry ===
- Nelson Algren's Chicago: City on the Make (1951) is a prose poem about the alleys and the El tracks, the neon and the dive bars, the beauty and cruelty of Chicago.
- David Auburn's play Proof (2000 New York debut) is set on the porch of a house in Hyde Park. The play focuses on the emotional turmoil experienced by Catherine, a young woman who recently lost her father, a prominent University of Chicago mathematician who suffered from an unspecified mental illness.
- Saul Bellow's The Adventures of Augie March (1953) charts the long, drifting life of a Jewish Chicagoan and his myriad eccentric acquaintances throughout the early 20th century: growing up in the then Eastern European neighborhood of Humboldt Park, cavorting with heiresses on Chicago's Gold Coast, studying at the University of Chicago, fleeing union thugs in the Loop, and taking the odd detour to hang out with Trotsky in Mexico while eagle-hunting giant iguanas on horseback. Novelist Martin Amis describes the book as "An epic about the so-called ordinary", a remark that indicates the text's sprawling, episodic structure. Amis also goes so far as to claim that "The Adventures of Augie March is the Great American Novel."
- Gwendolyn Brooks' A Street in Bronzeville (1945) is the collection of poems that launched the career of the famous Chicago poet, focusing on the aspirations, disappointments, and daily life of African-Americans living in 1940s Bronzeville.
- Frank London Brown's powerful debut novel, Trumbull Park (1959) fictionalizes the real-life ordeals of the first black families to integrate South Side Chicago's Trumbull Park public housing project in the 1950s. First published 1959. Henry Regnery Company, Chicago. Re-published 2004, 2005 by Northeastern University Press (Northeastern Library of Black Literature).
- Sandra Cisneros's The House on Mango Street (1983) is a Mexican-American coming-of-age novel, dealing with a young Latina girl, Esperanza Cordero, growing up in a neighborhood modeled on Chicago's Humboldt Park. It commonly appears in American high school reading lists.
- Theodore Dreiser's Sister Carrie (1900) tells the tale of a country girl who leaves home to seek her fortune, first in Chicago and later in New York. Its descriptions of Chicago include a portrait of Loop department stores at the end of the nineteenth century. According to the Dictionary of Literary Biography, Dreiser was an important figure in American naturalism.
- Stuart Dybek's The Coast of Chicago (2004), written in a style blending the gritty with the dreamlike, is a collection of fourteen short stories about growing up in Chicago, largely in neighborhoods such as Pilsen and Little Village populated by Eastern European and Latino immigrant communities.
- Eve Ewing's poetry collection 1919 (2019), a follow-up to her 2017 volume Electric Arches, uses poetry to depict the Chicago race riot of 1919 and grapple with its legacy a century after the Red Summer of 1919.
- James T. Farrell's Studs Lonigan: A Trilogy (1935) focuses on the often bitter lives of Chicago's South Side Irish-Americans during the 1920s and 30s, tying their fates to larger cultural narratives like the American Dream and to historical events like Prohibition and the Great Depression.
- Lorraine Hansberry's play A Raisin in the Sun (1959 Broadway debut) depicts the struggles faced by a working-class family of black Chicagoans who attempt to purchase a home in a segregated white neighborhood. The play echoes a real event: in 1938, Hansberry's father challenged the restrictive covenant that enforced racial segregation in Chicago's Washington Park Subdivision.
- Audrey Niffenegger's science fiction love story The Time Traveler's Wife (2003) takes place largely in North Side Chicago settings, including the Newberry Library.
- Frank Norris's The Pit (1903) is a naturalistic novel about greed and speculation at the early 20th-century Chicago Board of Trade. It is the second installment in The Epic of Wheat, a never-finished trilogy in which Norris planned to depict the economic life cycle of this crucial commodity from production to consumption.
- Carl Sandburg's Chicago Poems (1916) depicts scenes from early-twentieth-century Chicago, often focusing on working-class characters and commenting on the class divide. With this early volume, Sandburg established his reputation as the poet of the common American.
- Upton Sinclair's The Jungle (1906) belongs to the canons of both Chicago literature and US labor history for its muckraking depiction of the desolation experienced by Lithuanian immigrants working in the Union Stock Yards on Chicago's Southwest Side.
- Richard Wright's Native Son (1940), set in Depression-era Bronzeville and Hyde Park, is about a doomed, young, black man warped by the racism and poverty that define his surroundings.

=== Nonfiction ===
- Karen Abbott's Sin in the Second City (2007) provides a history of Chicago's vice district, the Levee, and some of the early twentieth-century personalities involved: gangsters, corrupt politicians, crusading reformers, and two sisters who ran the most elite brothel in town.
- Jane Addams' Twenty Years at Hull-House (1910), written by a social reformer who won the 1931 Nobel Peace prize, is an autobiography combined with firsthand investigation of poverty, immigrant communities, and political activism in turn-of-the-20th-century Chicago.
- Erik Larson's Devil in the White City (2003) is a best-selling popular history about the 1893 Colombian Exposition; it's also about the serial killer who was stalking the city at the same time. Straight history of the Exposition and also the workers' paradise in Pullman is found in James Gilbert's Perfect Cities: Chicago's Utopias of 1893.
- Mike Royko's Boss (1971), written by a Chicago Daily News columnist, is a biography of the powerful mayor Richard J. Daley. The book provides a critical look at Daley's rise to power and at Chicago's political culture of "clout". American Pharaoh (Cohen and Taylor) is a scholarly treatment of the same subject.
- Studs Terkel's Working (1974) is a series of interviews with American workers. Although Terkel interviewed people in other cities, most of his material comes from Chicago, and the book uses interviews to paint a composite portrait of Chicago as a laboring town.

=== Alternate Chicagos ===
Alternative versions of Chicago sometimes appear in fantasy and science fiction novels.

- Rena Barron's Maya and the Rising Dark (2020) is the start of a middle-grade fantasy series set in contemporary Chicago.
- Jim Butcher's The Dresden Files (begun 2000) is a series set in Chicago about Harry Dresden, Chicago's first (and only) Wizard PI, who protects the city from supernatural attack.
- C. L. Polk's Even Though I Knew the End (2022), which won the Nebula Award for Best Novella, is set in a fantasy version of 1940s Chicago.
- Veronica Roth's Divergent trilogy (2011–2013) is a young-adult series set in a dystopian future Chicago.

=== Other ===
Other noted writers, who were from Chicago or who spent a significant amount of their careers in Chicago include, David Mamet, Ernest Hemingway, Ben Hecht, John Dos Passos, Edgar Rice Burroughs, Edgar Lee Masters, Sherwood Anderson, Eugene Field, and Hamlin Garland.

== See also ==
- American Writers Museum
- Culture of Chicago
- List of fiction set in Chicago
- List of songs about Chicago
- Printers Row Lit Fest
