= Blues Brothers (disambiguation) =

The Blues Brothers are a rhythm and blues band founded in 1978 by comedians Dan Aykroyd and John Belushi in character as Elwood and Jake Blues.

Blues Brothers or The Blues Brothers may also refer to:

- The Blues Brothers (film), 1980 musical/comedy film starring Aykroyd and Belushi
- The Blues Brothers (novel), movie novelization by Mitch Glazer, published in 1980
- The Blues Brothers (video game), a video game where the object is to evade police in order to make it to a blues show
- "Blues Brothers" (Drake & Josh episode), a season two episode of Drake & Josh
- Blues Brothers 2000, 1998 musical/comedy film and sequel to the 1980 film
- Blues Brothers 2000 (soundtrack), the soundtrack album to the 1998 film
- Blues Brothers 2000 (video game), a video game for the Nintendo 64
- Blues Brothers: Private, tie-in book by Judith Belushi Pisano and Tino Insana, published in 1980

== See also ==
- Blues Brothers & Friends: Live from House of Blues, a 1997 live album by The Blues Brothers
