= Joseph Peterson =

Joseph Peterson may refer to:

- Joseph Peterson (psychologist) (1878–1935), American psychologist
- Joseph G. Peterson (born 1965), American novelist and poet
- Joseph R. Peterson (1904–1967), American lawyer and politician
- Joseph Peterson, American tobacco merchant, builder of Peterson–Dumesnil House
- Joe Peterson, American academic

== See also ==
- Peterson Joseph (born 1990), Haitian footballer
- Joseph Peters (disambiguation)
