= Joseph Peters =

Joseph Peters may refer to:

- J. Peters, American communist
- Josef Peters (racing driver) (1914-2001), racing driver from Düsseldorf, Germany,
- Joe Peters, American glass artist

== See also ==
- Joseph Peterson (disambiguation)
