= Gerald Stanley Lee =

American minister and writer (1862–1944)

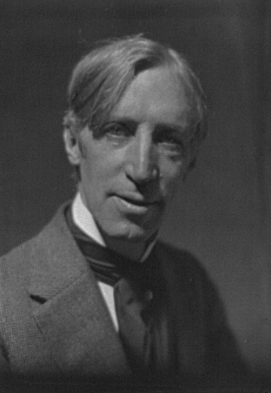
- Portrait of Gerald Stanley Lee by Arnold Genthe, 1922
- Born: October 4, 1862; Brockton
- Died: April 3, 1944 (aged 81); Northampton
- Spouse(s): Jennette Lee

Gerald Stanley Lee (October 4, 1862 – April 3, 1944) was an American writer and minister. He began his career as a clergyman in New England and the Midwest, becoming a full-time writer in 1896. Lee's writing focused on contemporary cultural developments such as the rise of mass media and technology.

== Early life and education ==
Gerald Stanley Lee was born on October 4, 1862, in Brockton, Massachusetts. He attended Oberlin College, Middlebury College (graduating in 1885), and Yale Divinity School.

== Career ==
Until 1896, Lee worked as a minister in New England and Minnesota. After 1896, he was a full-time writer. His first book, The Shadow Christ, was published that year. According to critic Ryan Jay Friedman, Lee's writing in the 1910s argued that Christian education was similar to mass media including advertising, in that both attempted to persuade people to "choose a particular 'good'".

Jo-Anne Pemberton compares Lee's The Voice of the Machines: An Introduction to the Twentieth Century (1906) with the works of Filippo Tommaso Marinetti and futurism.

Crowds: A Moving-Picture of Democracy (1913) argues that media can be used to develop a more cohesive polity. When Crowds was released in 1913, Lee wrote in a letter to Theodore Roosevelt that he hoped that it would be "the text-book of the Progressive Movement". According to Russ Castronovo, who calls Crowds a "crazy sort of book", the book argues for modern mass media as tools for democracy because they prioritize the present and thereby fuel modernization.

Lee opposed U.S. entry into World War I, writing essays and editorials characterizing the war as a clumsy effort of the nations involved to communicate their desires and one that could be settled without any U.S. intervention. This drew a harsh rebuke from G. K. Chesterton, who criticized Lee for imagining that the war then underway could be ended by mere discussion and for treating the warring forces as if they were on equal moral footing.

Lee was "a frequent contributor of reviews to the Critic and other periodicals and wrote books on religion, modern culture, and physical fitness". He published a magazine called Mount Tom in Northampton, Massachusetts.

According to Leonidas Warren Payne Jr., Lee was "a milder, saner sort of twentieth-century Carlyle, interpreting human nature in new terms for the new age".

== Personal life ==
Lee married Jennette Barbour Perry in 1896. A 1909 profile of Gerald and Jennette described him as a "dreamer", "philosopher", and "wit" who had yet to "come into his own". He died on April 3, 1944, in Northampton.

== Bibliography ==
- The Shadow Christ (1896)
- The Lost Art of Reading (1902)
- The Voice of the Machines (1906)
- The Child and the Book (1907)
- Inspired Millionaires (1908)
- Crowds: A Moving-Picture of Democracy (1913)
- We: A Confession of Faith for the American People During and After War (1916)
- The Air-Line to Liberty (1918)
- The Ghost in the White House (1920)
- Invisible Exercise; Seven Studies in Self Command With Practical Suggestions and Drills (1922)
- Heathen Rage (1931)
- Mount Tom (magazine) (1905–1917)

== Sources ==
- Bush, Gregory Wallace (1991). Lord of Attention: Gerald Stanley Lee and the Crowd Metaphor in Industrializing America. University of Massachusetts Press. ISBN 0-585-21758-0. OCLC 44962103.
- Friedman, Ryan Jay (February 4, 2019). "Enlightened Public Opinion: Postreform Progressivism, Mental Science, and Gerald Stanley Lee's "Moving-Pictures"". The Movies as a World Force: American Silent Cinema and the Utopian Imagination. Rutgers University Press. pp. 23–43. doi:10.36019/9780813593630-002. ISBN 978-0-8135-9363-0. S2CID 242167097.
