= American Writers Museum =

Museum in Chicago

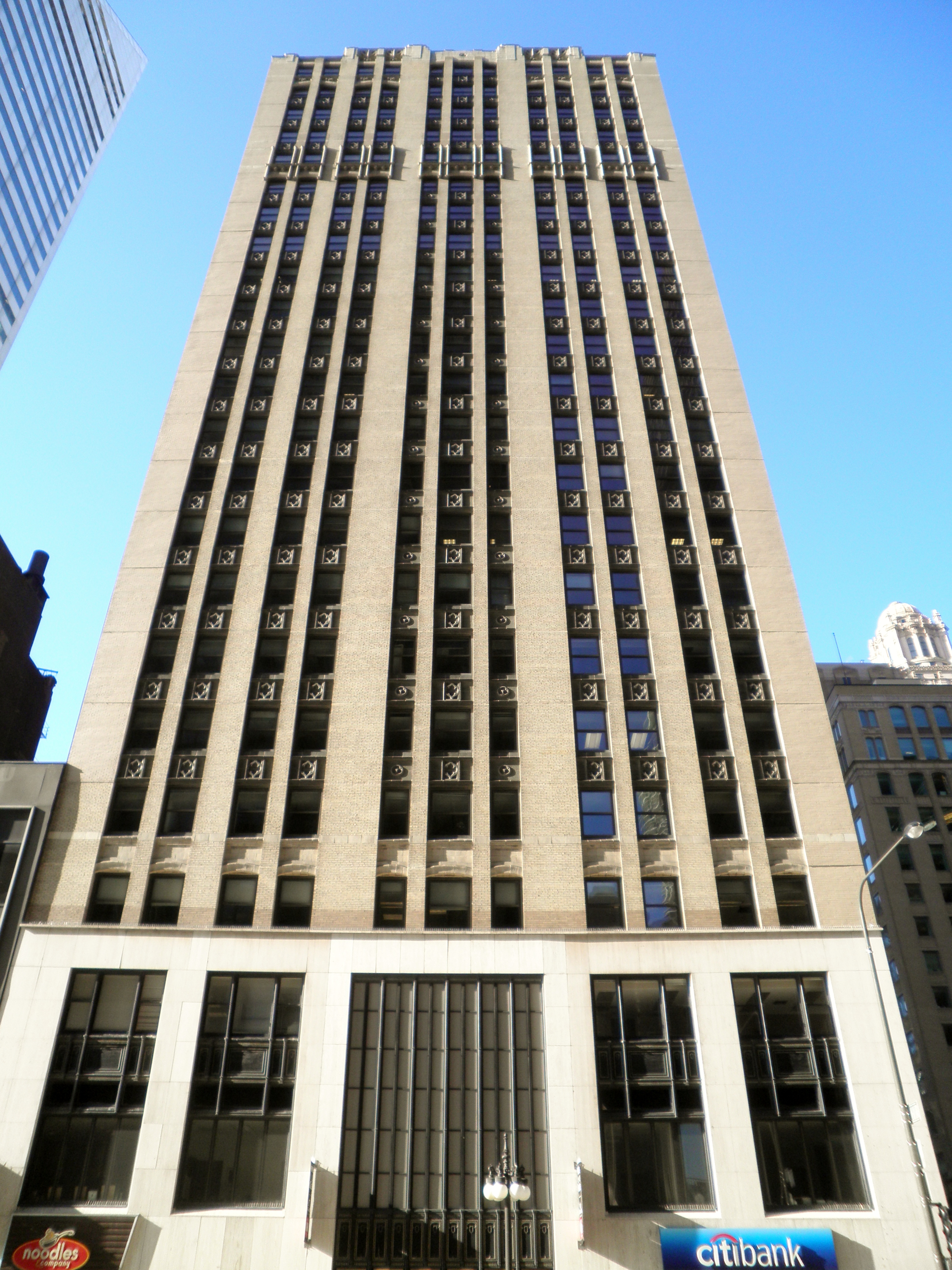
- The museum is located on the second floor of 180 N. Michigan
- Established: 2010 (space opened in 2017)
- Location: Chicago, Illinois, United States
- Coordinates: 41.885553°N 87.624831°W
- Type: Culture
- Founder: Malcolm E. O'Hagan
- President: Carey Cranston
- Website: americanwritersmuseum.org

The American Writers Museum is a museum of American Literature and writing that opened in Chicago in May 2017. The museum was designed by Amaze Design of Boston.

The American museum was inspired by the Dublin Writers Museum.

== Permanent exhibits ==
=== Nation of Writers Gallery ===
This gallery celebrates the breadth and depth of American writing through the following three exhibits.

==== American Voices ====
A 60-foot-long timeline featuring 100 authors that represent the evolution and flourishing of American writing. The exhibit shows the evolution of the American literary voice over time.

==== Surprise Bookshelf ====
This wall features 100 works representing dozens of writing categories. Visitors can open boxes in the wall to reveal a sensory connection to that work, including smells, sounds, writing, and dioramas.

==== Word Waterfall ====
An immersive light experience in the Nation of Writers gallery. A wall of random words are revealed to be literary quotes on perspectives on being American through light projections.

=== Readers Hall ===
The American Writers Museum primary event and programming space, this large room features information on the walls about libraries and the history of reading in the United States, as well as a space to read the provided books. Visitors can also vote for their favorite books at two kiosks that update leaderboards visible above the voting stations.

=== The Mind of Writer ===
A gallery designed to illustrate how writers think and what the writing process is like by showing how writers use language and giving visitors a chance to write themselves. The gallery includes large touch tables that feature insights on 35 works of American writing, wall displays with writing advice, an interactive dialogue generator, and touch screen facts and games. Visitors can also write a story on vintage typewriters, taking or leaving their work for others to continue.

=== Chicago Gallery ===
A gallery that features the many writers lived in Chicago during their lives. Hanging banners give biographical information about each writer. A touch screen map also allows visitors to explore literary locations throughout the city.

- Writers Hall
- A Writer's Room
- Children's Gallery
- Changing Exhibits Gallery

== American Writers Festival ==
On May 15, 2022, the American Writers Museum hosted the American Writers Festival at the Chicago Cultural Center and the American Writers Museum. All events at the Festival were free to attend. Featured panelists at the Festival included Joy Harjo, Viet Thanh Nguyen, Jacqueline Woodson, Peter Sagal, Marc Lamont Hill, Elie Mystal, and Natalie Moore.
