= Rob Rains =

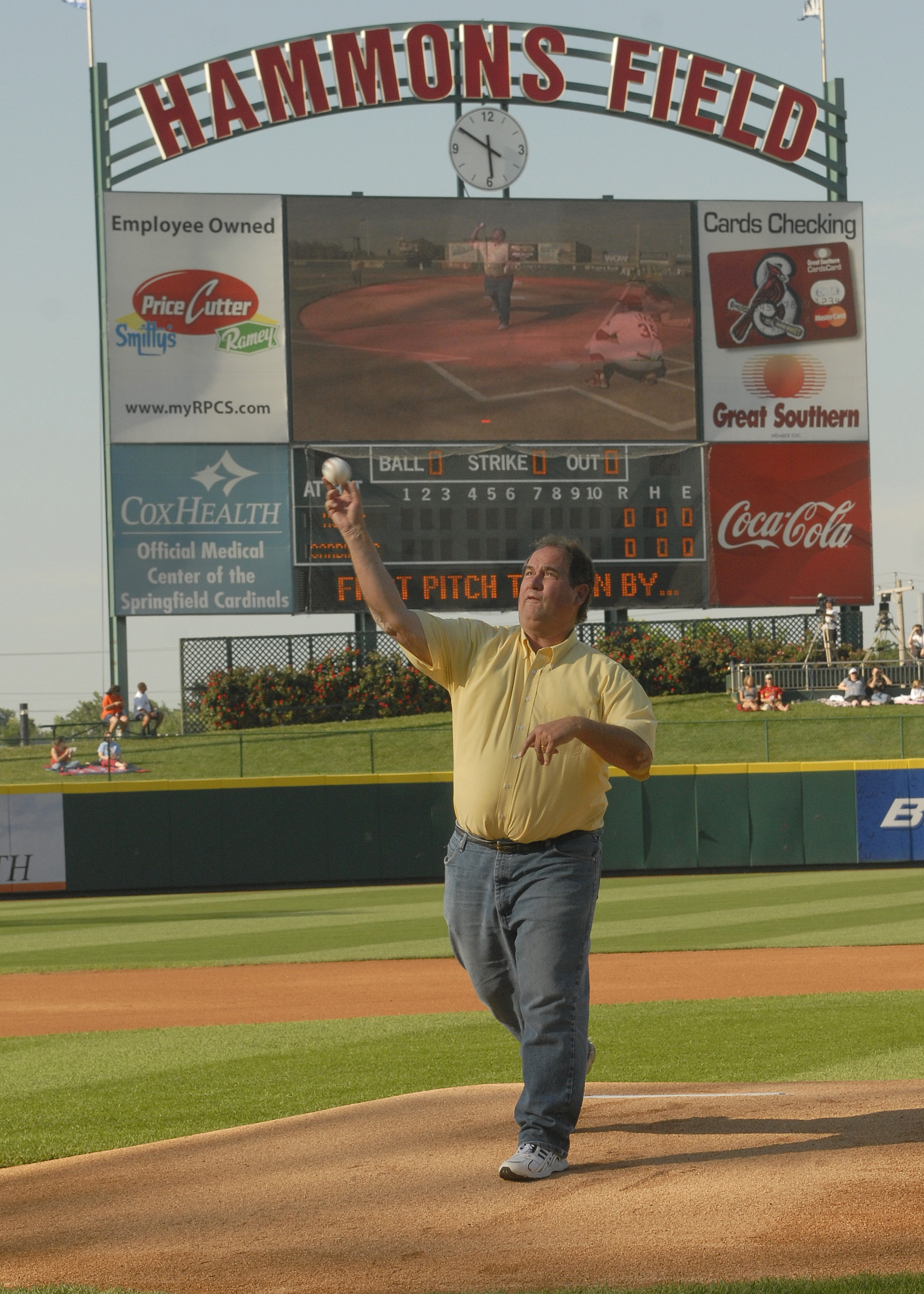
- Rob Rains Throws Out First Pitch- Springfield Cardinals 2010
- Writing career
- Notable works: 'Mark McGwire; Home Run Hero' (St. Martin's Publishing), 'Jack Buck; That's a Winner' (Sports Publishing), 'Intentional Walk' (Thomas Nelson Publishers),'The Curse: Cubs Win! Cubs Win! Or Do They?' 'James Naismith: The Man Who Invented Basketball'
- Notable awards: The Freedom Forum Grant, 'Missouri Sports Hall of Fame'
- Website: stlsportspage.com

Rob Rains is the editor of STLSportsPage.com and former National League beat writer for USA Today's Baseball Weekly and for three years covered the St. Louis Cardinals for the St. Louis Globe-Democrat until its collapse in the 1980s. He was awarded the Freedom Forum Grant to teach Journalism for a year at the Walter Cronkite School of Journalism at Arizona State. Rains has been writing books, magazine articles, and doing radio for the past 10 years. He is based in St. Louis, Missouri.

Rains has written or co-written more than 30 books, most on baseball, including autobiographies or biographies of Mark McGwire, Ozzie Smith, Jack Buck, Red Schoendienst, and Dave Phillips. Rains is also the co-author of The Curse: Cubs Win! Cubs Win! Or Do They? which he wrote with former St. Louis Cardinal Andy Van Slyke. The Curse is a novel that describes a tragic plane crash that kills almost the entire Chicago Cubs roster, and the new players that soldier on to take the Cubs to their first World Series in decades. Rains is also the author of James Naismith: The Man Who Invented Basketball, co-written with Naismith's granddaughter Hellen Carpenter.

== Publications by date ==
- Intentional Walk: An Inside Look at the Faith That Drives the St. Louis Cardinals. 2013 ISBN 978-0-8499-6458-9
- Tony La Russa: Man on a Mission. 2011 ISBN 1-60078-557-3
- The Curse: Cubs Win! Cubs Win! or Do They? (With Andy Van Slyke) 2010 ISBN 0-9841130-5-3
- Albert Pujols: Simply The Best (with John Rooney) 2009 ISBN 1-60078-351-1
- James Naismith: The Man Who Invented Basketball. 2009 ISBN 1-4399-0133-3
- Where Have All the Cardinals Gone? Sports Publishing. 2005. ISBN 1-58261-155-6
- Albert the Great: the Albert Pujols Story Sports Publishing. 2005. ISBN 1-60078-351-1
- My One Big Break: Inspiring Stories of Successful Business and Professional Leaders With Jack Grimm and Clark Johnson. Spotlight Press. 2004. ISBN 1-58261-906-9
- Centerfield on Fire: An Umpire’s Tales of Spitballs, Pine Tar Bats and Corked Personalities (with Dave Phillips). Triumph Books. 2004 ISBN 1-57243-569-0
- Big Stix: The Greatest Hitters in the History of Baseball Sports Publishing, 2004 ISBN 1-58261-757-0
- Beyond X’s and O’s, My Thirty Years in the NFL (with Jim Hanifan). Sports Publishing Inc., 2003. ISBN 1-58261-670-1
- A Special Season. Sports Publishing 2003. ISBN 1-58261-657-4
- Whitey’s Boys Triumph Books, 2002. ISBN 1-57243-485-6
- Ozzie Smith, the Road to Cooperstown Sports Publishing, 2002. ISBN 1-58261-598-5
- Cardinal Nation The Sporting News, 2002. ISBN 0-89204-888-3
- Baseball Samurais, Ichiro Suzuki and the Japanese Invasion St. Martin's Press, 2001. ISBN 0-312-98257-7
- The Mighty ‘Mox, the 75th Anniversary History of KMOX Radio (with Sally Rains). Diamond Communications, 2000. ISBN 1-888698-35-7
- Marshall Faulk, Rushing to Glory Sports Publishing, 1999. ISBN 1-58261-191-2
- Find A Way, Valpo’s Sweet Season Diamond Communications, 1999. ISBN 1-888698-23-3
- Mac Attack Sports Publishing, 1998. ISBN 1-58261-004-5
- Slugger Sports Publishing, 1998. ISBN 1-58261-005-3
- Mark McGwire, Home Run Hero St. Martin’s Press, 1998. ISBN 0-312-97109-5
- Red: A Baseball Life (with Red Schoendienst). Sports Publishing, 1998. ISBN 1-57167-200-1
- Jack Buck, That’s A Winner Sports Publishing, 1997. ISBN 1-58261-135-1
- Playing On His Team (with Sally Rains). CrossTraining Publishing, 1996. ISBN 978-1-887002-57-8
- The Cardinal Fans Little Book of Wit and Wisdom Diamond Communications, 1994. ISBN 1-888698-49-7
- The St. Louis Cardinals’ 100th Anniversary History St. Martin's Press, 1992. ISBN 0-312-07089-6
- Top 150 Minor League Prospects The Sporting News, 1990. ISBN 0-89204-335-0
- Wizard (with Ozzie Smith). Contemporary Books, 1988. ISBN 0-8092-4594-9
