= Mr. Achilles =

1912 novel by Jennette Lee

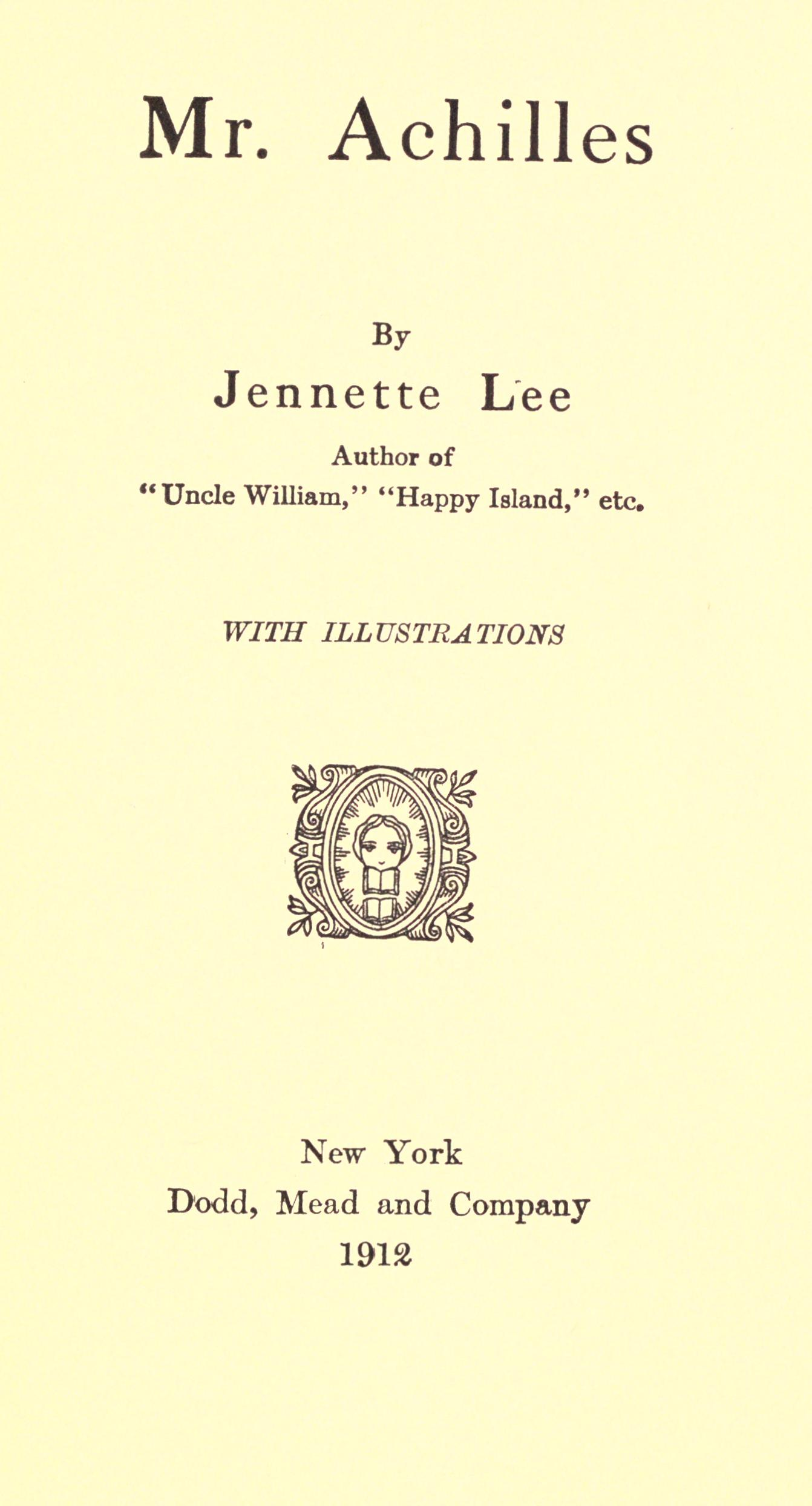
- Author: Jennette Lee
- Language: English
- Publisher: Dodd, Mead & Co.
- Publication date: 1912
- Publication place: United States
- Pages: 261

Mr. Achilles is a novel by Jennette Lee. It was first published in 1912 by Dodd, Mead & Co. In Mr. Achilles, the eponymous Achilles Alexandrakis, a fruitseller, befriends Betty Harris, the daughter of a meatpacking magnate, and rescues her when she is kidnapped.

== Composition and publication ==
Mr. Achilles is set in Chicago, where Lee lived for three years. Lee got the idea for the novel's protagonist from a story she heard Jane Addams tell of a Greek person who came to Chicago, looking forward to telling Americans about Greek mythology and ruins. She did not start writing the novel until a year or two later. Its first part was published in Harper's Magazine; later chapters were serialized in The Outlook in 1911. The complete novel was published by Dodd, Mead & Co. in 1912.

== Synopsis ==
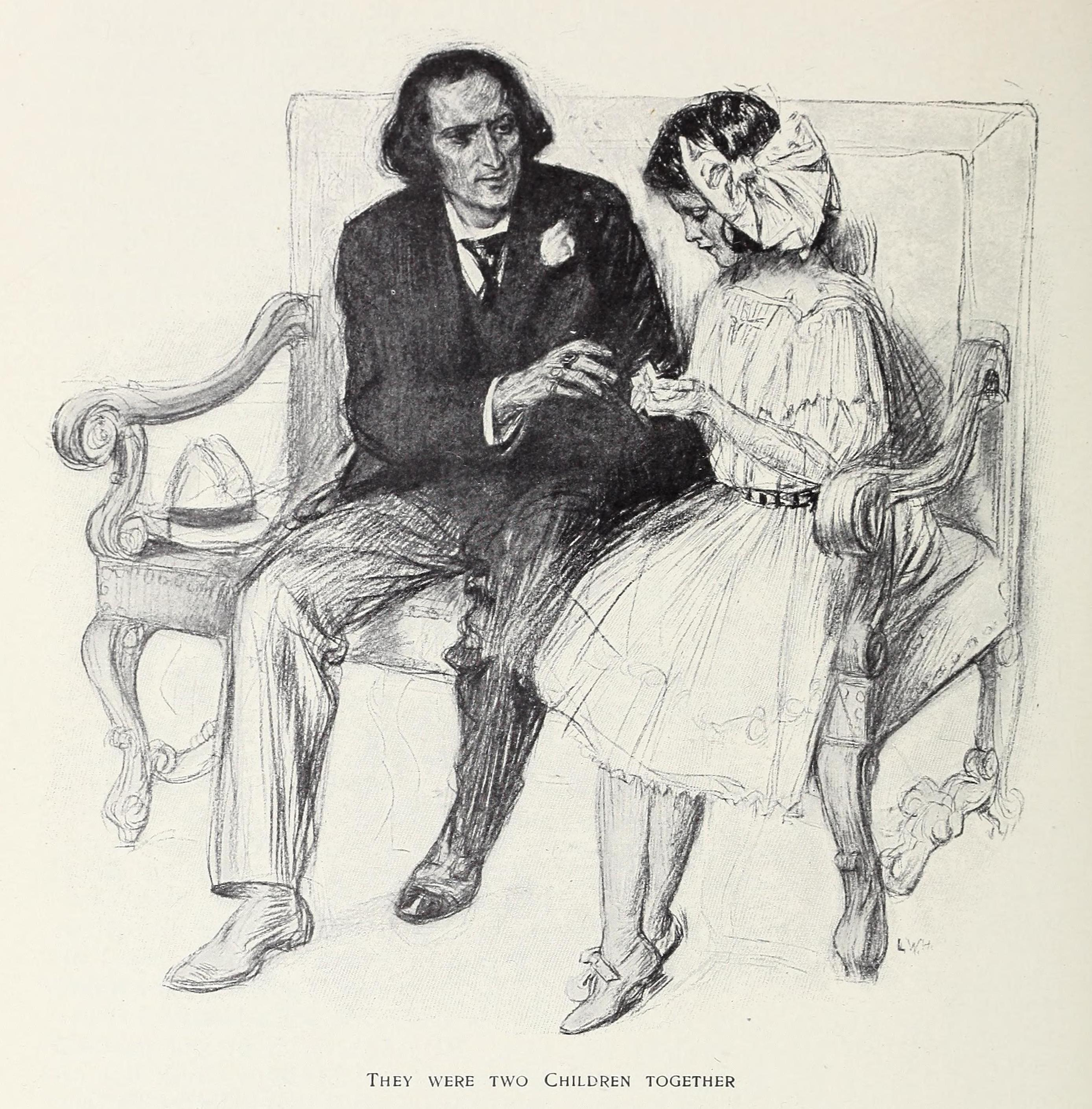
Achilles and Betty in Harper's Magazine, 1907, by Lucius Wolcott Hitchcock

Mr. Achilles is the first American novel in which a Greek immigrant, fruit stand owner Achilles Alexandrakis, appears as a protagonist. Achilles, who is from Athens, meets Betty Harris, the 12-year-old daughter of a millionaire meat magnate, when she is trying to find her way home after a music lesson. She asks him about Greek culture and listens attentively to his stories. Achilles befriends and subsequently rescues Betty when she is kidnapped.

== Reception ==
A review in The Continent, a journal affiliated with the Presbyterian church, described Mr. Achilles as "a trifle overidealistic" but nonetheless "uncommonly pretty". The Pittsburgh Daily Post, although it noted that the plot was not "plausible", said that the novel should be "praised" because it was "prettily told, even at times with much art". The Brooklyn Eagle suggested that, in writing Mr. Achilles, Lee intended to "teach us that we are trampling pearls under our feet in our neglect of our Greek immigrants".

Critic James A. Kaser describes Mr. Achilles as "melodramatic". He argues that the novel attempted to tackle prejudice against immigrants and nouveaux riches, and also addressed the "epidemic of kidnappings" targeting the wealthy in the United States around the turn of the century.
