= Mob Enforcer =

2004 video game

- Developer: Touchdown Entertainment
- Publishers: ValuSoft (PC); Kemco U.S.A. (Xbox)
- Platforms: Windows, Xbox
- Release: Windows; 11 June 2004; Xbox; 23 February 2005
- Genre: First-person shooter
- Modes: Single player, multiplayer

Mob Enforcer is a 2004 Mafia-related PC game developed by Touchdown Entertainment. It was released on the Xbox a year later with multiplayer capabilities under the title Chicago Enforcer. Multiplayer on Xbox Live was available to players until April 2010. Chicago Enforcer is now playable online again on the replacement Xbox Live servers called Insignia.

== Reception ==
GameZone had a mixed review for the PC version, finding it entertaining for the effective gameplay, non-linear approach and authentic 1920s recreation, but criticized the lack of creativity and unforgiving enemies, stating that "the game gets repetitive and frustrating." The Xbox port, however, had a much more negative reception. GameSpot gave the game a 2.3 out of 10, finding it a repetitive and ugly game, with broken gameplay that featured "AI either overpowered or underpowered" and "underwhelming weapons". IGN gave a 4.1, with the review reading that "Any fun that could be squeezed out of this poorly designed title is negated by long loading times and unbalanced game mechanics." TeamXbox was more forgiving with a 5.1, feeling that "some situations created by the AI are interesting and do a nice job of reflecting the style of gunplay that would have taken place during the 1930s".
