= Jennette Lee =

American writer and academic (1860–1951)

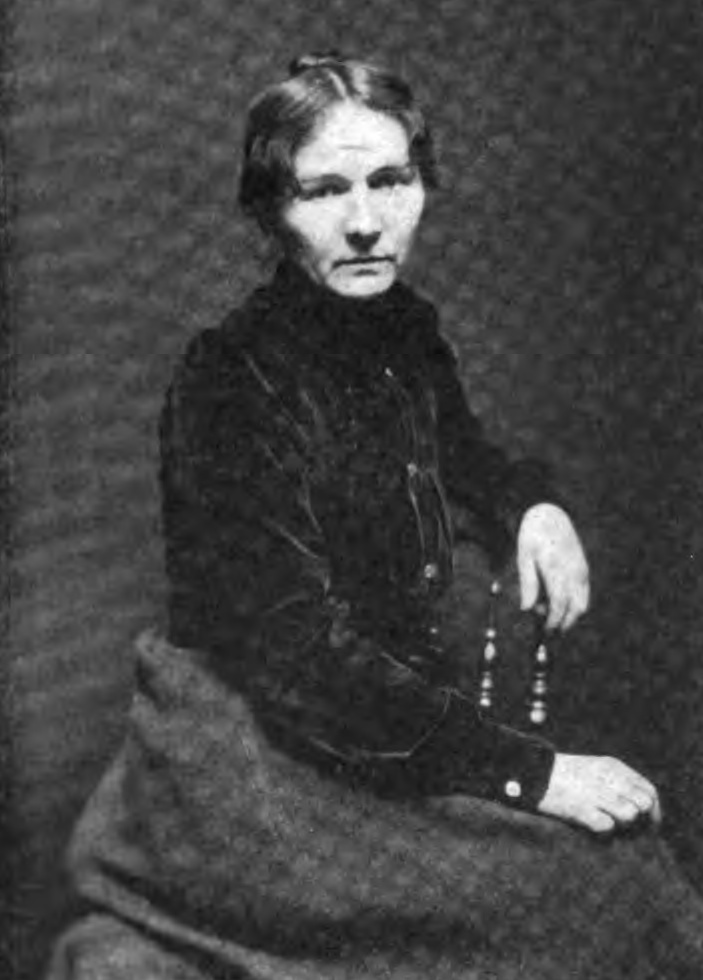
- Jennette Lee circa 1905
- Born: November 10, 1860; Bristol
- Died: October 16, 1951 (aged 90); Northampton
- Alma mater: Smith College
- Occupation: Writer, academic
- Spouse(s): Gerald Stanley Lee

Jennette Barbour Perry Lee (November 10, 1860 – October 10, 1951) was an American writer and academic. Born in Connecticut, she began to teach at a local school in her teens. She graduated from Smith College in 1886 and soon afterward started teaching English at the collegiate level. Over the course of her career, Lee wrote numerous novels and short stories, many centered on life and characters in New England.

== Early life and education ==
Jennette Barbour Perry was born on November 10, 1860, in Bristol, Connecticut, to Mary (Barbour) and Philemon Perry. She started teaching at an elementary school near Bristol at age 15. After studying subjects including Greek on her own, she took the entrance exam to enter Smith College in 1882 and graduated in 1886.

== Academic career ==
From 1890 to 1893, Lee taught English at Vassar College, and from 1893 to 1896 she was head of the department of English in the College for Women at Western Reserve University (now Case Western Reserve University). From 1904 to 1913, she was a professor of English language and literature at Smith.

== Writing ==
Lee's first published work was a short story called "Bufiddle", which appeared in The Independent on August 4, 1887. Her first novel was Kate Wetherill: An Earth Comedy, published by The Century Company in 1900. According to a review in the Chicago Tribune, Kate Wetherill is about "the evolution of a woman's soul". It is divided into three parts: hell, purgatory, and heaven. Another contemporary review regarded Kate as an example of "the New England type of woman" who was "becoming conspicuously prominent in the fiction of the day".

Her novel A Pillar of Salt (1901) is about life in a Connecticut factory village. Its main characters are a "thrifty, practical minded wife" and a "dreaming unpractical husband". The husband tries to patent an invention which his employer tries to claim; the wife "has no faith in his invention" and tries to "discourage" him.

The Son of a Fiddler (1902) describes Spencer Gordon (the "fiddler", a violinist) and his son Alec. Alec eventually finds his mother, an actor in Boston, and enters the "theatrical life".

The Ibsen Secret: A Key to the Prose Dramas of Henrik Ibsen (1907), a work of criticism, compares the drama of Henrik Ibsen to the novels of Henry James and argues that Ibsen's symbolism can be decoded by a reference to a "central theme or motive" given by an "object or event".

Mr. Achilles (1912) is set in Chicago, where Lee lived for three years. Lee got the idea for the novel's protagonist from a story she heard Jane Addams tell of a Greek person who came to Chicago, looking forward to telling Americans about Greek mythology and ruins. She did not start writing the novel until a year or two later. Its first part was published in Harper's Magazine; later chapters were serialized in The Outlook in 1911. Mr. Achilles is the first American novel in which a Greek immigrant, fruit stand owner Achilles Alexandrakis, appears as a protagonist. The novel, in which Achilles rescues a kidnapped daughter of an industrialist, attempts to tackle prejudice against immigrants and nouveaux riches.

The Taste of Apples (1913) is about a shoemaker with his head in the clouds and his practical-minded wife who live in a New England town called Bolton (possibly Bolton, Massachusetts, or Bolton, Connecticut). They take a trip to London where they meet a "real live English lord".

Unfinished Portraits (1916) is a set of fictionalized biographical sketches of historical artists and musicians, including Franz Schubert, Frédéric Chopin, Giorgione, and Albrecht Dürer. The section on Chopin reportedly "created a controversy in Europe" because some of its fictional statements were taken as factual.

Her short story "The Cat and the King", published in the Ladies' Home Journal in 1919, describes love between two women college students. Lillian Faderman argues that "[t]he probable lack of sophistication of most Journal readers explains perhaps why love between women could be treated in such positive terms at so late a date".

== Personal life ==
In 1896, Jennette married Gerald Stanley Lee. As of 1901, she and Gerald lived in Northampton, Massachusetts. From 1926 to 1933, they ran an institution called the "Training School for Balance and Coordination" in New York. She died on October 10, 1951, in Northampton.

== Works ==
- Kate Wetherill (1900)
- A Pillar of Salt (1901)
- The Son of a Fiddler (1902)
- Uncle William (1906)
- The Ibsen Secret: A Key to the Prose Dramas of Henrik Ibsen (1907)
- Simeon Tetlow's Shadow (1909)
- Happy Island (1910)
- Mr. Achilles (1912)
- Betty Harris (1912)
- The Taste of Apples (1913)
- The Women in the Alcove (1914)
- Aunt Jane (1915)
- Unfinished Portraits (1916)
- The Green Jacket (1917)
- The Air-Man and the Tramp (1918)
- The Rain-Coat Girl (1919)
- The Other Susan (1921)
- Uncle Bijah's Ghost (1922)
- This Magic Body (1946)
