= Andy Van Slyke =

American baseball player and coach (born 1960)

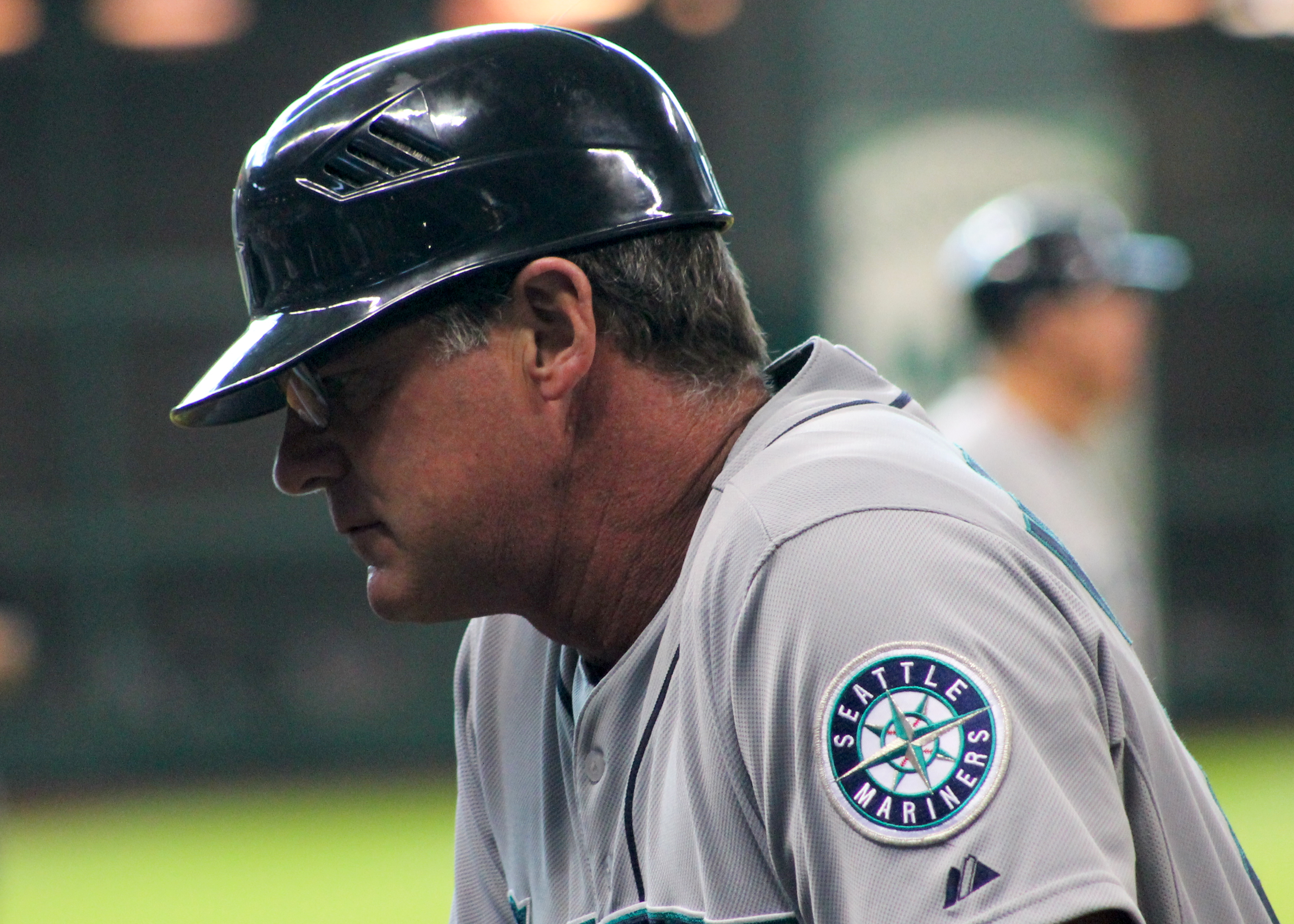
- Van Slyke as coach with the Seattle Mariners in 2014
- Center fielder
- Born: December 21, 1960 (age 65); Utica, New York, U.S.
- Batted: Left Threw: Right

MLB debut
- June 17, 1983, for the St. Louis Cardinals

Last MLB appearance
- October 1, 1995, for the Philadelphia Phillies

MLB statistics
- Batting average: .274
- Home runs: 164
- Runs batted in: 792
- Stats at Baseball Reference

Teams
- As player: St. Louis Cardinals (1983–1986); Pittsburgh Pirates (1987–1994); Baltimore Orioles (1995); Philadelphia Phillies (1995); As coach: Detroit Tigers (2006–2009); Seattle Mariners (2014–2015)

Career highlights and awards
- 3× All-Star (1988, 1992, 1993); 5× Gold Glove Award (1988–1992); 2× Silver Slugger Award (1988, 1992)

Andrew James Van Slyke (born December 21, 1960) is an American former Major League Baseball (MLB) center fielder and coach.

== Early life ==
Andrew James Van Slyke was born on December 21, 1960. Van Slyke attended New Hartford Central High School in New Hartford, New York, where he excelled in baseball and earned All-American honors as a senior.

== Professional career ==
=== Draft and minor leagues ===
He was drafted in the first round (sixth overall pick) of the 1979 Major League Baseball amateur draft by the St. Louis Cardinals.

=== St. Louis Cardinals (1983–1986) ===
Called up from the AAA Louisville Redbirds, he made his Major League debut with the Cardinals on June 17, 1983, collecting a double, a run batted in (RBI) and making three putouts in the outfield without an error.

The first two years of his career Van Slyke played first base, third base and all three outfield positions. He mostly played right field the next two years on the strength of his throwing arm, occasionally platooning with Tito Landrum, sometimes substituting for Willie McGee in center field. Van Slyke was the Cardinals' right fielder during the 1985 World Series; in Game 6 he fielded Dane Iorg's ninth-inning game winning two-run base hit and his true and accurate throw was barely beaten by Jim Sundberg for the winning run. On September 21, 1986, he hit a rare inside-the-park home run.

=== Pittsburgh Pirates (1987–1994) ===
During spring training 1987, he was traded to the Pittsburgh Pirates along with left-handed hitting catcher Mike LaValliere and minor league pitcher Mike Dunne for catcher Tony Peña. The trade occurred on April 1, with Van Slyke initially believing that it was an April Fools' Day joke. In Pittsburgh, he mostly played center field alongside stars Barry Bonds and Bobby Bonilla.

During the 1991 Gulf War, when MLB decreed all players would wear both the Canadian and U.S. flags on their batting helmets as a patriotic gesture, Van Slyke scraped the Maple Leaf off his helmet, stating "I guess the people in Quebec won't be upset because the last time we were there they booed [the Canadian] National Anthem". MLB Commissioner Fay Vincent ordered that the Canadian flag decal be reinserted onto the helmet.

=== Playing career ===
Van Slyke possessed one of the most accurate and powerful throwing arms in the majors, so much that the "Slyke Zone" was established at Three Rivers Stadium. From 1985 to 1994, he was frequently among the league leaders in outfield assists. From 1985 to 1988, he posted seasons of 13, 10, 11, and 12 assists, respectively. As center fielder for the Pirates, he won five consecutive Gold Gloves from 1988 to 1992. In 1988, Van Slyke set career highs with 25 home runs and 100 RBIs, led the majors with 15 triples and 13 sacrifice flies, and finished fourth in National League MVP voting. In 1992, Van Slyke led the National League in hits with 199 and doubles with 45 while finishing second with a .324 batting average.

Van Slyke played for four teams in his career: the St. Louis Cardinals (1983–1986), Pittsburgh Pirates (1987–1994), Baltimore Orioles (1995), and Philadelphia Phillies (1995). He played his final game on October 1, 1995. In his 13-year career, Van Slyke appeared in three All-Star games (1988, 1992, 1993), won five Gold Glove Awards, two Silver Slugger Awards, and ranked in the top 10 in many offensive categories in varying seasons.

In 1658 games over 13 seasons, Van Slyke compiled a .274 batting average (1562-for-5711) with 835 runs, 293 doubles, 91 triples, 164 home runs, 792 RBI, 245 stolen bases, 667 walks, 1063 strikeouts, an on-base percentage of .349 and a slugging percentage of .443. He recorded a .987 fielding percentage at all three outfield positions, first base and third base.

== Coaching career ==
=== Detroit Tigers (2006–2009) ===
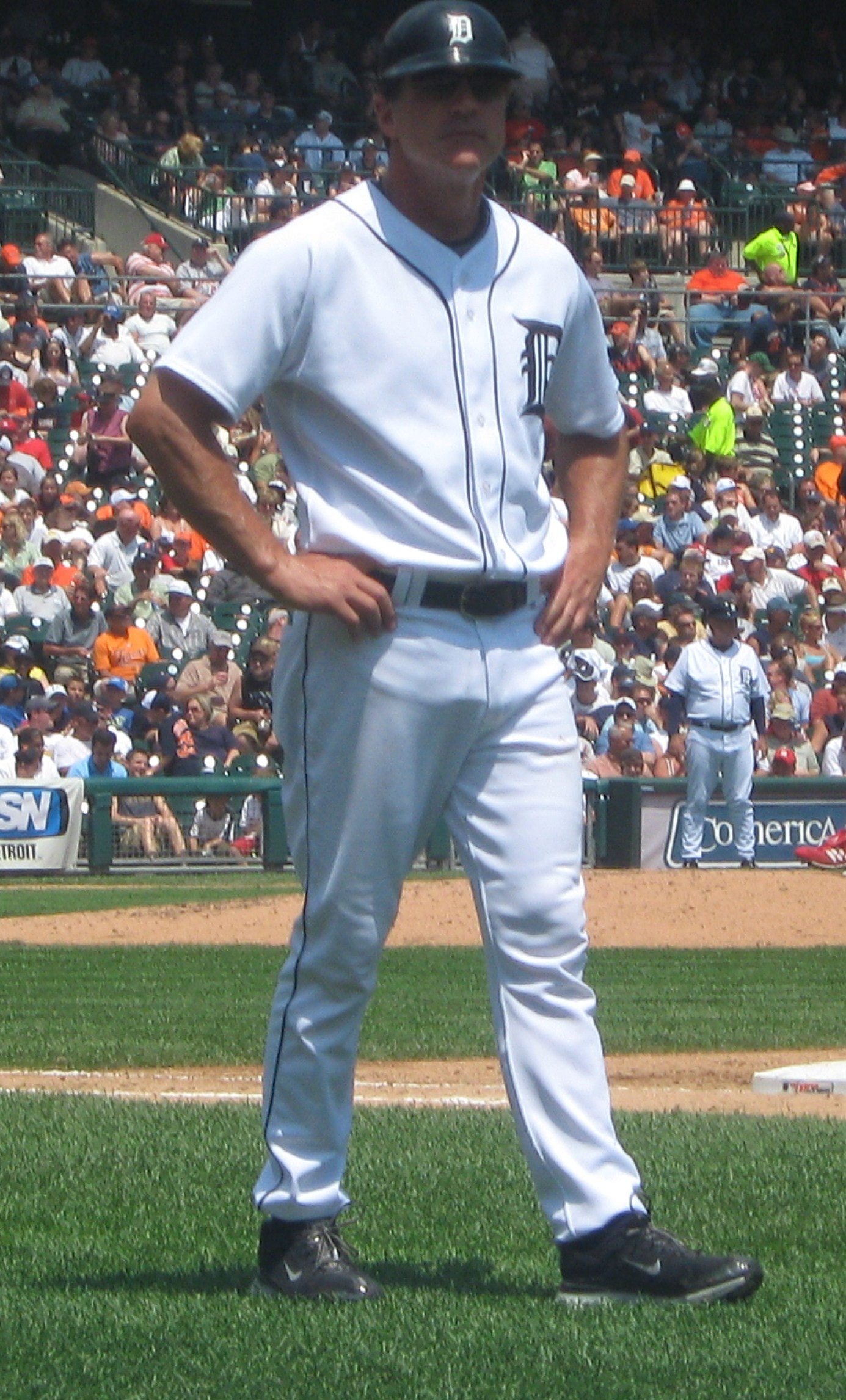
Van Slyke with Detroit

Prior to the 2006 season, Van Slyke was named first base coach for the Detroit Tigers by manager Jim Leyland, under whom he had played in Pittsburgh. Van Slyke served in that capacity on Leyland's staff for four years through the 2009 season.

=== Seattle Mariners (2014–2015) ===
When Lloyd McClendon was named the Seattle Mariners' manager prior to the 2014 season, Van Slyke was hired to be the team's first base coach. He also worked as the assistant hitting coach and outfield instructor through the 2015 season.

=== Transactions ===
- June 5, 1979: Drafted by the St. Louis Cardinals in the first round (6th pick) of the 1979 amateur draft.
- April 1, 1987: Traded by the St. Louis Cardinals with Mike Dunne and Mike LaValliere to the Pittsburgh Pirates for Tony Peña.
- October 21, 1994: Granted free agency.
- April 21, 1995: Signed as a free agent with the Baltimore Orioles.
- June 18, 1995: Traded by the Baltimore Orioles to the Philadelphia Phillies for Gene Harris.
- November 3, 1995: Granted free agency.

=== Salaries ===
- 1983: St. Louis Cardinals: $35,000
- 1984: St. Louis Cardinals: $40,000
- 1985: St. Louis Cardinals: $170,000
- 1986: St. Louis Cardinals: $335,000
- 1987: Pittsburgh Pirates: $550,000
- 1988 #: Pittsburgh Pirates: $825,000
- 1989: Pittsburgh Pirates: $2,150,000
- 1990: Pittsburgh Pirates: $1,200,000
- 1991: Pittsburgh Pirates: $2,180,000
- 1992 #: Pittsburgh Pirates: $4,350,000 (Including $100,000 earned bonus)
- 1993 #: Pittsburgh Pirates: $4,900,000 (Including $250K signing bonus and $50K earned bonus)
- 1994: Pittsburgh Pirates: $3,550,000 (Including $250K signing bonus)
- 1995: Baltimore Orioles: $600,000 (including $50,000 earned bonus)
- 1995: Philadelphia Phillies: Undetermined

# = MLB All-Star Game selection

=== National Baseball Hall of Fame consideration ===
Van Slyke became eligible for the National Baseball Hall of Fame in 2001. 75% of the vote was necessary for induction, and 5% was necessary to stay on the ballot. Of the 32 total candidates, Van Slyke received no votes and was eliminated from future BBWAA voting. He still remains eligible for the Hall of Fame via the Veterans Committee.

== Career after baseball ==
After baseball, Van Slyke pursued a career as an author, focusing on books centered on baseball. In 2009, he authored Tiger Confidential: The Untold Inside Story of the 2008 Season (with co-author Jim Hawkins). In July 2010, he published The Curse: Cubs Win! Cubs Win! Or Do They? (with co-author Rob Rains), a book in the subgenre sports fiction about the Chicago Cubs finally breaking their one hundred year curse and playing in the World Series.

== Personal life ==
Van Slyke has four sons, three of whom played college or professional sports. Scott Van Slyke played for the Los Angeles Dodgers and the Doosan Bears of the KBO league; Jared Van Slyke was a defensive back on the University of Michigan football team; and A. J. Van Slyke played baseball for the University of Kansas and for four seasons in the St. Louis Cardinals' minor league system.

He attended New Hartford Central High School in New Hartford, New York, Class of 1979. His father was the school's principal.

== See also ==
- List of Major League Baseball annual doubles leaders
- List of Major League Baseball annual triples leaders
- List of Major League Baseball career stolen bases leaders
- List of second-generation Major League Baseball players

Preceded by Mick Kelleher	Detroit Tigers first base coach 2006–2009	Succeeded by Tom Brookens
Preceded by Mike Brumley	Seattle Mariners first base coach 2014–2015	Succeeded by Chris Woodward
