= Rena Barron =

American author of young adult fiction

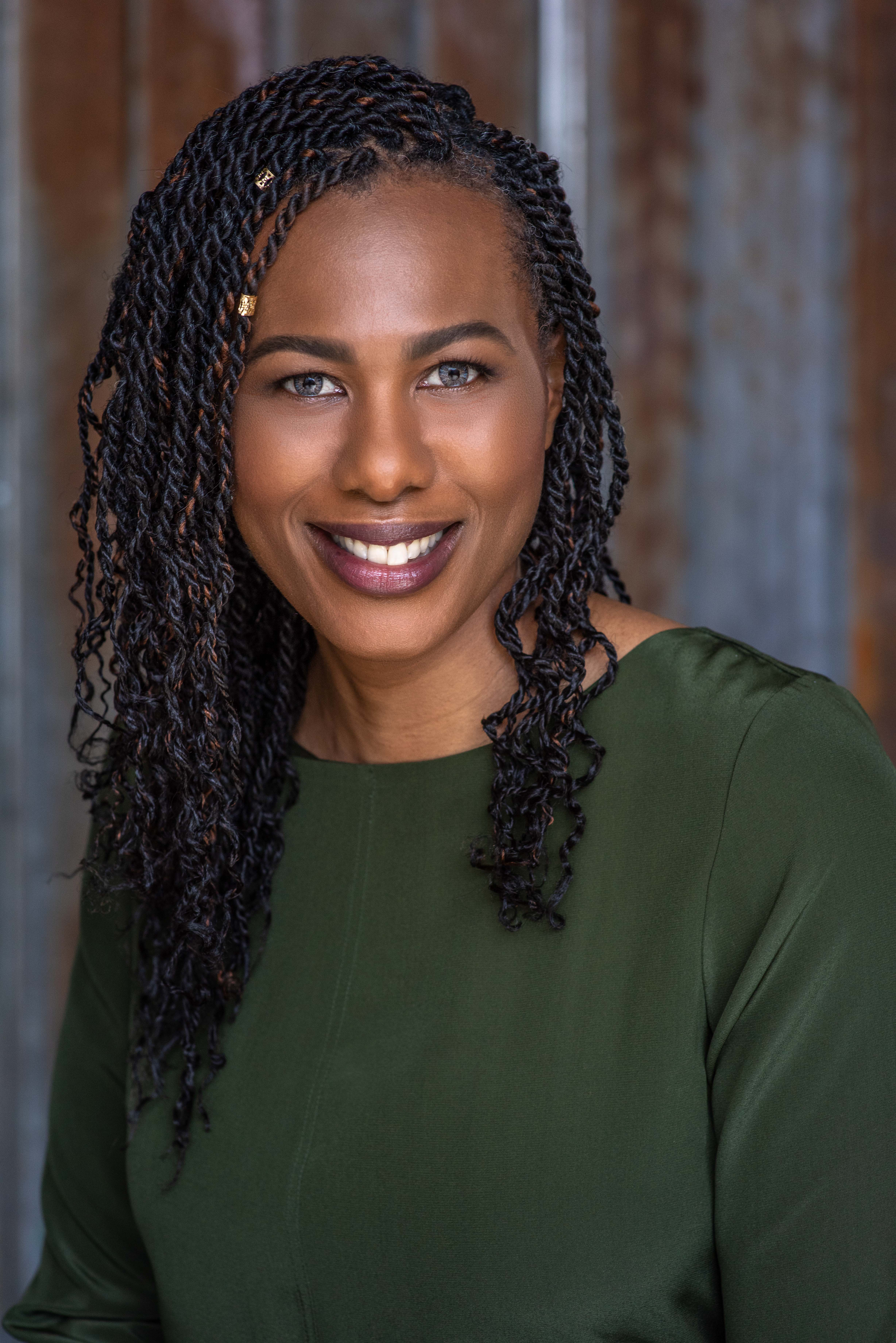
- Writing career
- Language: English
- Years active: 2019–present
- Genres: Young adult fiction, Middle Grade fiction
- Notable work: Kingdom of Souls
- Website: renabarron.com

Rena Barron is an American author of middle grade and young adult fiction, best known for her debut young adult fantasy novel Kingdom of Souls.

== Early life ==
Barron grew up in small-town Alabama, where her family owned a farm, and says she's always had an obsession with science fiction and fantasy.

Growing up, she heard a lot of stories about people practicing voodoo, which initially piqued her interest, since it was often talked about in a negative light. As a child, she was taught vodun, a West African spiritual practice, which served as the inspiration for her debut novel. The books she read most were adult, which she says is due to her love of complicated stories on the dark side, which wasn't as prevalent in children's literature at the time. Her favorite books were The Last Vampire series by Christopher Pike, the Animorphs series, and many books by R.L. Stine.

== Personal life ==
She considers herself part of the West African diaspora "removed from her ancestors' traditions". Some of her favorite authors include Margaret Atwood, Leigh Bardugo, Holly Black, Octavia Butler, Suzanne Collins, N.K. Jemisin, and Toni Morrison.

Barron lives in Chicago and works at an ad agency.

== Career ==
Barrin wrote her first poem in middle school and wrote her first stories and novels in high school.

She has written two-book series: Kingdom of Souls and Maya the Rising Dark.

=== Kingdom of Souls Series ===
==== Kingdom of Souls ====
===== Backstory =====
Barron didn't originally set out to write a trilogy, but found that the story demanded it. She completed the first draft of the story in 2013, but put the project on hold after receiving a number of rejections on it after first sending it out in 2014. She revisited the story in 2017, rewriting it from the ground up. The book was originally told in dual perspective of the main character and love interest.

The manuscript, then called The Last Witchdoctor, was showcased during Pitch Wars, a now-defunct online pitch contest for a spring authors, where it became the most-requested manuscript in the history of the six-year contest, having garnered interest by 43 literary agents.

===== Plot =====
Set in a West African-inspired fictional kingdom, it tells the story of Arrah, a girl failing at magic to the extent that her mother conjures a better daughter, whose magic soon threatens the kingdom.

===== Reception =====
Kingdom of Souls (HarperTeen, 2019) was a Best Fiction for Young Adults selection by Young Adult Library Services Association (YALSA). It received a starred review from School Library Journal. It was also published by HarperCollins UK in the United Kingdom in 2020.

===== Film Adaptation =====
In 2019, Michael B. Jordan's Warner Brothers-based production company Outlier Society acquired the movie rights for the first book, with Jordan to produce alongside Alana Mayo and Pouya Shahbazian based on a screenplay by Misan Sagay.

==== Reaper of Souls ====
The second book in the series, Reaper of Souls, about a now-magic possessing Arrah who's become the last surviving witchdoctor and is hunted by the Demon King, was first published by HarperTeen in 2021. It was also published by HarperCollins UK in the United Kingdom in 2021.

=== Maya and the Rising Dark Series ===
==== Maya and the Rising Dark ====
===== Background =====
Barron says she's had chronic illnesses all her life, some invisible, which inspired her to write about a main character in Maya that also has similar experiences, without making it the center of her story. The neighborhood Maya lives in is modeled after one that Barron lived in herself for many years.

===== Plot =====
The first book, Maya and the Rising Dark (HMH Books, 2020), based on West African mythology, tells the story of twelve-year-old Maya who starts seeing fantastical creatures around Chicago and relates that to stories her father told her that she previously dismissed as fiction.

===== Reception =====
It received starred reviews from School Library Journal and Kirkus Reviews.

== Works ==
=== Kingdom of Souls series ===
- Kingdom of Souls. HarperTeen, 2019.
- Reaper of Souls. HarperTeen, 2021.
- Master of Souls. HarperTeen, 2023.

=== Maya and the Rising Dark series ===
- Maya and the Rising Dark. HMH Books, 2020.
- Maya and the Return of the Godlings. Clarion Books, 2021.
- Maya and the Lord of Shadows. Clarion/HarperCollins, 2022.
