= The Curse: Cubs Win! Cubs Win! Or Do They? =

2010 novel by Andy Van Slyke

Curse: Cubs Win! Cubs Win! or Do They?
- Author: Andy Van Slyke and Rob Rains
- Language: English
- Genre: Baseball, Mystery
- Publisher: Ascend Books
- Publication date: July 15, 2010
- Publication place: US
- Media type: Print (Paperback)
- Pages: 320
- ISBN: 978-0-984-11305-7

Curse: Cubs Win! Cubs Win! or Do They? is a baseball and mystery novel written by Andy Van Slyke and Rob Rains. The Curse is a fictional account of the Chicago Cubs and their journey from a tragic plane crash to a World Series victory.

== Plot ==
The book entails a present-day Cubs team as they attempt to overcome tragedy and avoid adding their names to the long list of curses plaguing their franchise's history.

The Chicago Cubs lead their division and have the highest record in the National League one week before the All-Star break. The team last won a pennant in 1945 and a World Series in 1908.

As the team's charter flight is heading from Chicago to the West Coast, the plane crashes. All but two players are killed, along with the manager, general manager, coaches and other team executives and broadcasters.

Baseball is forced to implement its never-disclosed disaster plan. The "new" Chicago Cubs come together with uncommon backgrounds, with the intention of winning the pennant and the World Series.

The manager is a burned out baseball veteran who was fired as the team's Triple A manager after going into the stands to attack a fan. One of the key players turns out to be the great-great-grandson of Jimmy Slagle, the center fielder of the 1908 Cubs.

Billy Slagle is a 28-year-old journeyman outfielder who had been on the Cubs' Triple A affiliate in Iowa. He is one of those players who has always been on the fringe of making it to the major leagues but has never received much of a chance. He becomes the leader of the new Cubs as they continue their drive toward the pennant and the World Series. He becomes interested in the history of the team and of his long-deceased relative and retraces his background, including visiting the site of that team's home stadium, West Side Grounds, where a hospital now stands.

Slagle also will accompany the reader on his history course of the Cubs' failed pennant attempts of the past, learning about the Curse of the Billy Goat; about the collapse of the 1969 Cubs, watching the ball squirt through Leon Durham's legs in the 1984 playoffs, and cursing Steve Bartman and how he got in the way of the 2003 Cubs' pennant clinching moment.

The Cubs, thanks largely to Slagle's play, do go on to win the pennant and earn a spot in the World Series.

The novel has a dual storyline, following the exploits of the new Cubs on the field while also covering the investigation into the cause of the plane crash, which it turns out might not have been an accident.
