= Kate Walbert =

American writer (born 1961)

- Born: August 13, 1961 (age 65); New York City, New York, U.S.
- Writing career
- Genres: novelist, short story writer

Kate Walbert (born August 13, 1961) is an American novelist and short story writer who lives in New York City. Her novel, Our Kind, was a finalist for the National Book Award in fiction. Her novel A Short History of Women, a New York Times bestseller, was a finalist for the Los Angeles Times Book Prize and named one of the ten best books of 2009 by The New York Times.

== Life ==
Walbert was born in New York City but raised in Georgia, Texas, Japan, and Pennsylvania. After graduating from Choate Rosemary Hall, she attended Northwestern University’s School of Communication before earning a master's degree in English from NYU. Among other publications, her short fiction has appeared in The New Yorker, and The Paris Review, and has twice been included in The Best American Short Stories and the O. Henry Awards. She has published two short story collection and five novels. Her first novel, The Gardens of Kyoto, received the Connecticut Book Award in fiction and was a finalist for the IMPAC/Dublin award.

== Awards ==
Walbert was a recipient of a National Endowment for the Arts Fellowship and a Connecticut Commission on the Arts Fellowship. From 2011 to 2012, she was a Fellow at the Dorothy and Lewis B. Cullman Center for Writers and Scholars at the New York Public Library.

== Partial bibliography ==
=== Novels ===
- His Favorites (2018)
- The Sunken Cathedral (2015)
- A Short History of Women (2009)
- Our Kind (2004)
- The Gardens of Kyoto (2001)

=== Short fiction ===
- She Was Like That: New and Selected Stories (2019)
- Where She Went (1998)

=== Plays ===
- Genius
- A Short History of Women (an adaptation)
- Elsewhere
- Year of the Woman

== Reviews ==
- Reviewing A Short History of Women, The Washington Post called Walbert “reminiscent of a host of innovative writers from Virginia Woolf to Muriel Spark to Pat Barker.”
