= Joseph G. Peterson =

American poet

Joseph G. Peterson (born 1965) is an American novelist and poet from Chicago, Illinois. He grew up in Wheeling, Illinois and attended Wheeling High School. He worked at an aluminum mill and then studied philosophy at the University of Chicago. He lives in Chicago with his wife and two daughters.

From 1992-1998, he edited and published the zine Storyhead, which Factsheet Five called "a zine of stunning illustration and provocative writing that ranks among the very best." Peterson published writers such as Stu Mead, David Greenberger, and Wisława Szymborska, recipient of the 1996 Nobel Prize for Literature.

== Critical reception ==
Reviews of Peterson's first novel Beautiful Piece, paid particular attention to the unusual structure of the narrative. In Prairie Schooner, J. Weintraub's review noted that the novel's structure "continues on a nonchronological progression all of its own, obsessively developing what has been, to a large degree, already revealed" in the first few pages. Weintraub compared the effect of this repetition to musical composition: "Like a musical composition by Philip Glass or Brian Eno, themes are introduced, repeated, ornamented, taken in a new direction, repeated, and varied again." Stuart Shiffman writing in the Illinois Times called it "an entertaining and gritty novel written in the noir style of mysteries".

Peterson second work was an epic poem, Inside the Whale, which Publishers Weekly noted as following 'Irishman Jim O'Connor, an aspiring poet and successful alcoholic, as he moves disastrously through life in modern Chicago. In addition to Peterson's narrative, plenty of Jim's 'actual' poems appear throughout, facilitating an effortless shifting between third and first person accounts of the drunken bard's exploits."

Wanted: Elevator Man was analyzed by Daniel Mattingly in "Crash Fiction: American Literary Novels of the Global Financial Crisis" (along with The Financial Lives of the Poets by Jess Walters and Union Atlantic by Adam Haslett) as an example of "crash fiction"—novels that reflect the economic recession that followed the crash of 2008. According to Mattingly, these novels examine "the perils of under-employment, financial strain in middle class families, and young adults struggling to find work after graduating from university. In all three of these novels the protagonists start out with expectations of joining the elites but find themselves struggling for employment and dealing with the diminished expectations that their current employment brings. In Wanted: Elevator Man, Peterson looks at a figure, Barnes who aspires to a corner office in a glitzy sky-rise building, but ends up as a helper to an elevator mechanic working in the bowels of a sky-rise."

The title character of Peterson's third novel, Gideon's Confession, is reminiscent of Herman Melville's Bartleby. Gideon describes himself as "a compass without a magnet" and drifts through an existential indecision funded by regular checks from a wealthy uncle. Reviewing the book in South Side Weekly Olivia Stovicek called it "a powerful meditation on the allure of inaction and the paralyzing effects of choice" while also noting that "ending is abrupt."

== Novels and Stories ==
- Beautiful Piece (Switchgrass Books, an imprint of Northern Illinois University Press), 2009, ISBN 9780875806297
- Inside The Whale: A Novel in Verse (Wicker Park Press), 2011, ISBN 9781936679010
- Wanted: Elevator Man (Switchgrass Books), 2012, ISBN 9780875806778
- Gideon's Confession (Switchgrass Books), 2014, ISBN 9780875807027
- Twilight of the Idiots: Stories (Chicago Center for Literature and Photography, 2015, ISBN 9781939987273)
- Gunmetal Blue (Tortoise Books, 2017, ISBN 9780998632568)
- Ninety-Nine Bottles (Tortoise Books, 2019, ISBN 9781948954051)
- The Rumphulus (University of Iowa Press, 2020, ISBN 9781609387303)
- Memorandum from the Iowa Cloud Appreciation Society (University of Iowa Press, 2022, ISBN 9781609388775)
