= The Blues Brothers (novel) =

1980 novel by Miami Mitch

- Cover for "The Blues Brothers", a novelization of The Blues Brothers
- Author: Miami Mitch
- Language: English
- Genre: Novelization
- Publisher: Jove (G. P. Putnam's Sons); MCA Publishing
- Publication date: June 1980
- Publication place: United States
- Media type: Print (Mass market paperback)
- Pages: 245 (Mass Market paperback)
- ISBN: 0-515-05630-8
- OCLC: 15900532
- LC Class: CPB Box no. 2626 vol. 8

The Blues Brothers is a book written by Crawdaddy! reporter Miami Mitch (Glazer) and published in 1980. The novel was based on the original version of The Blues Brothers screenplay written by Dan Aykroyd and John Landis. However, the original script that was used for the basis of the novel evolved so dramatically into what was used in the film that the two works only scantly resemble each other.

The book contains eight glossy pages of black-and-white stills from the film, two per page. Scene breaks are marked by two pairs of sunglasses.
