= Robin Wood (critic) =

English film critic (1931–2009)

- Wood (ca. 1972)
- Born: 23 February 1931; Richmond, Surrey, England
- Died: 18 December 2009 (aged 78); Toronto, Ontario, Canada
- Occupations: Professor, author, film critic
- Partner: Richard Lippe

Robert Paul "Robin" Wood (23 February 1931 – 18 December 2009) was an English film critic and educator who lived in Canada for much of his life. He wrote books on the works of Alfred Hitchcock, Howard Hawks, Satyajit Ray, Ingmar Bergman, Michelangelo Antonioni, and Arthur Penn. Wood was a longtime member—and co-founder, along with other colleagues at Toronto's York University—of the editorial collective which publishes CineACTION!, a film theory magazine. Wood was also York professor emeritus of film.

== Biography ==
=== Early life ===
Wood was born in Richmond, Surrey, England. According to Contemporary Authors he attended Jesus College, Cambridge, where he was influenced by F. R. Leavis and A. P. Rossiter, and graduated in 1953 with a BA in English and a diploma in education. From 1954 to 1958, Wood taught in schools in both England and Sweden. After a year in Lille, France, teaching English, Wood returned to schools in England, and again in Sweden, where he met Aline Macdonald, whom he married on 17 May 1960. (They had three children: Carin, Fiona, and Simon.)

=== Early career ===
Wood began to contribute to the film journal Movie in 1962, primarily on the strength of an essay he wrote for Cahiers du cinéma on Hitchcock's Psycho. In 1965, he published his first book, Hitchcock's Films (New York: A. S. Barnes, 1965). From 1969 to 1972, under the aegis of Peter Harcourt, Wood was a lecturer in film at Queen's University, Kingston, Ontario. In September 1974, Wood and his wife divorced. Around this time, he also had a relationship with John Anderson, the dedicatee in at least one of Wood's books. Later he was to meet Richard Lippe, with whom he lived from 1977 until his death in 2009.

From 1973 to 1977, Wood was a lecturer on film studies at the University of Warwick, Coventry, one of the first three such courses in Britain, which he founded with financial support from the British Film Institute. Here he met the future film scholar Andrew Britton, whose influence on Wood, by Wood's own account, was as great as Wood's on his student. Britton is said to have led him away from liberal attitudes and towards a further-Left position but this is a fallacy. The development of Wood's critical thinking is indicated in 'An Interview with Robin Wood' by Elizabeth Aherene and Jenny Norman, dated 9 May 1974 and published in the first issue of the film journal Framework by June 1975. Further insight can be obtained through lectures given by Wood during February–March 1975, prior to the arrival of Britton.

=== Recognition ===
It was Wood's initial rejection by the British journal Sight & Sound and recognition by Cahiers du cinéma, through the publication of his Hitchcock essay, which launched his career as a film critic. This prompted him to study and gradually embrace notions of the Nouvelle Vague directors: from Claude Chabrol to Jean-Luc Godard. He wanted to understand semiology – the science of signs – which explains cultures in terms of sign systems. This approach of breaking films down into signs leads the critic to ask "What does it mean and why is it there?" – analysing, for example, techniques such as camera distance/movement, etc. So, instead of purely celebrating 'auteur theory' (which originated as 'auteur policy', from François Truffaut) – the fact that some directors are establishable as artists and others are not – he became captivated by the idea of relating a film to a whole culture at a particular time, opposed to a specific director. Through ultimately recognising the importance of the work done by those who had recognised him, Wood traded the hypocrisies of accepting a 'comfortable life' – by allowing one's scruples to be purchased by the highest bidder – for integrity: a quality he valued the highest among artists and critics, alike, of significant merit. In answer to a student who complained in 1976, "I'm not interested in politics!", Wood responded with words to the effect: "The very fact of living is a political act!"

He became professor of film studies at York University, Toronto in 1977, where he taught until his retirement in the early 1990s. In 1985, he helped form a collective with several other students and colleagues to found and publish CineAction (originally styled CineACTION!).

Wood's books include Ingmar Bergman (Praeger, New York, 1969), Arthur Penn (Praeger, New York, 1969), The Apu Trilogy (Praeger, New York, 1971), The American Nightmare: Essays on the Horror Film, edited by Robin Wood and Richard Lippe (Festival of Festivals, Toronto, 1979), Hollywood from Vietnam to Reagan (Columbia University Press, New York, 1986), Sexual Politics and Narrative Film: Hollywood and Beyond (Columbia University Press, New York, 1998), The Wings of the Dove: Henry James in the 1990s (British Film Institute Publishing, London, 1999), and Rio Bravo (BFI Publishing, London, 2003). His novel Trammel up the Consequence was published posthumously by his estate in 2011.

Wood died of leukaemia on 18 December 2009 in Toronto. Wood's book Hitchcock's Films received four votes in a 2010 Sight & Sound poll of the best film-related books ever written.

== Scholarship and analysis ==
Changes in Wood's critical thinking divide his career into two parts. Wood's early books are still prized by film students for their close readings in the auteur theory tradition and their elegant prose style. Wood brought psychological insight into the motivations of characters in movies such as Psycho and Marnie, and Wood was admired for his tendency to champion under-recognised directors and films.

After his coming out as a gay man, Wood's writings became more – though not exclusively – political, primarily from a stance associated with Marxist and Freudian thinking, and with gay rights. The turning point in Wood's views can arguably be pinpointed in his essay "Responsibilities of a Gay Film Critic", originally a speech at London's National Film Theatre and later published in the January 1978 issue of Film Comment. It was subsequently included in the revised edition of his book Personal Views.

== Legacy ==
Some of Wood's students have also become notable film scholars, including Andrew Britton and Tony Williams. His former student Bruce LaBruce is now an underground film director. Former student Daniel Nearing is director of the experimental Chicago Heights and Hogtown. Shortly before his passing, Wood made a list of his favourite films. The titles were unranked, except his number one. They were "Either I Can't Sleep or I Don't Want to Sleep Alone, Sansho the Bailiff, Tokyo Story, either Ruggles of Red Gap or Make Way for Tomorrow, Code Inconnu, The Reckless Moment or Letter From an Unknown Woman, Angel Face, The Seven Samurai and either Le Crime de Monsieur Lange or La regle de jeu." Number one was Howard Hawks's Rio Bravo.

== Bibliography ==
Columbia University Press has reprinted and updated Wood's book on Hitchcock, and Wayne State University Press began a series of reprints of his early books, with new introductions. The first in the series was Howard Hawks in 2006, followed by Personal Views and Ingmar Bergman.

- Hitchcock's Films, 1965
- Howard Hawks, 1968
- "Arthur Penn", 1968
- Ingmar Bergman, 1969
- Claude Chabrol, Wood and Michael Walker, 1970
- The Apu Trilogy, Praeger, New York, 1971.
- Antonioni, Revised Edition, Wood and Ian Cameron, 1971
- Personal Views: Explorations in Film, 1976
- Hollywood from Vietnam to Reagan, 1986
- Hitchcock's Films Revisited, 1989
- Sexual Politics and Narrative Film: Hollywood and Beyond, 1998
- The Wings of the Dove, 1999
- Rio Bravo, 2003
- Hollywood from Vietnam to Reagan…and Beyond, 2003
- Where the Nightmare Ends, PS Publishing, 2023
