= Governors State University =

Public university in University Park, Illinois, US

Coordinates: 41°26′55″N 87°43′00″W

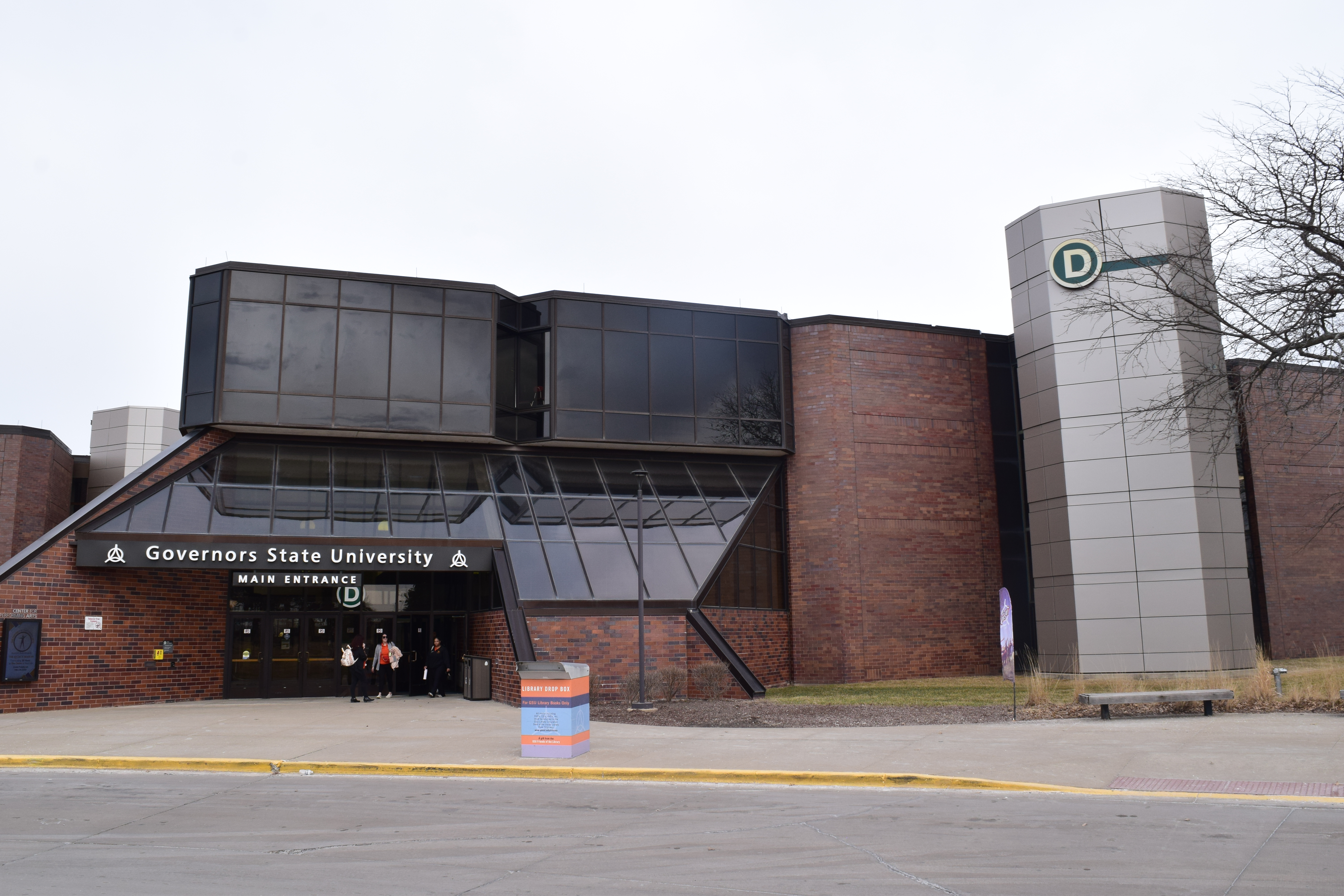
- Main entrance as seen in 2026
- Type: Public university
- Established: 1969; 57 years ago
- President: Joyce Ester
- Provost: Beverly Schneller
- Administrative staff: 1,192
- Students: 4,427 (fall 2022)
- Undergraduates: 2,609 (fall 2022)
- Postgraduates: 1,818 (fall 2022)
- Location: University Park, Illinois, United States
- Campus: Suburban
- Colors: Orange & Black
- Nickname: Jaguars
- Sporting affiliations: NAIA – CCAC
- Mascot: Jax the Jaguar
- Website: govst.edu

Governors State University (Governors State, GSU, GovState, or GOVST) is a public university in University Park, Illinois, United States. The 750 acres (3.0 km^{2}) campus is located 30 miles (48 km) south of Chicago, Illinois. GSU was founded in 1969. It is a public university offering degree programs at the undergraduate, master's, and doctoral levels. GSU has four colleges: the College of Arts and Sciences, the College of Business, the College of Education, and the College of Health and Human Services.

== History ==
Governors State University was established as a state-supported, upper-division institution of education on July 17, 1969, when Illinois Governor Richard B. Ogilvie signed into law House Bill 666. Originally scheduled to open to students in September 1973, the four-year planning period was reduced to two years and GSU received its first class of 500 students in September 1971. The university utilized warehouse space as the temporary home during the campus construction. Under the university's first president, William Engbretson, academic staff created an experimental educational environment focused on a collaborative learning environment between students and faculty in class sessions called modules that met for eight-week sessions. GSU was one of the original "Universities without Walls" as well as a university that did not offer grades, but competencies. In place of departments, it had interdisciplinary studies, and all professors held the rank of University Professor.

The university transitioned from the experimental curriculum to a more traditional model after Engbretson stepped down and Leo Goodman-Malamuth became GSU's second president. GSU developed academic divisions and departments, professors with rank (Assistant Professor, Associate Professor and Professor), and renovated the open space main building to classroom and office space. Structured classes in a trimester schedule, along with traditional transcripts were other changes during the era.

Following the original mandate to serve the underserved student populations such as veterans and nontraditional students with some college credits but no degree, the university developed telecourses in the 1980s. The classes were held in one of GSU's two television studios then were made available via tape or as programming on cable channels.

The first doctoral program was created in 2007 as a professional doctoral degree in physical therapy. GSU further developed other doctoral programs in nursing, occupational therapy, and education. In 2014, the state approved the university to expand curriculum for freshmen and sophomores. Along with welcoming freshmen and sophomores to campus, the university opened its first on-campus residence hall, known as Prairie Place. The university created small class sizes for freshmen with courses taught by full-time faculty and individual sessions capped at 30 students.

== Campus ==
The Campus is located 30 miles (48 km) south of Chicago. It is within 30 minutes' drive from cities Kankakee and Joliet as well as northwestern Indiana. The main campus is located on a 750-acre (3.0 km^{2}) wooded landscape with several lakes and natural trails.

=== Points of interest ===
- The Family Development Center (FDC) provides programs for children and their parents. The Family Development Center will be the Model Early Education Center for the South Suburbs. GSU Family development center programs model the best practices in Early Childhood Education and draw extensively on the expertise of university faculty and staff in Early Childhood Education, Nursing, Communications Disorders (speech and hearing), Psychology and Counseling. University students in these programs at both the undergraduate and graduate levels are active participants in the Family Development Center. The Family Development Center has been nationally recognized for meeting the highest standards of early childhood education. The National Association for the Education of Young Children (NAEYC), the nation's leading professional organization working on behalf of young children, has awarded accreditation to the FDC.
- GSU is also home to the Center for Performing Arts, which draws entertainers and artists from around the world, as well as the local community.
- The Ethnographic Arts Collection is owned by the University Foundation of Governors State University. It dates nearly from the beginning of the university. Objects were donated by former faculty, students, and patrons for the purpose of direct instruction in art history classes and ethnic studies.

=== Sustainability ===
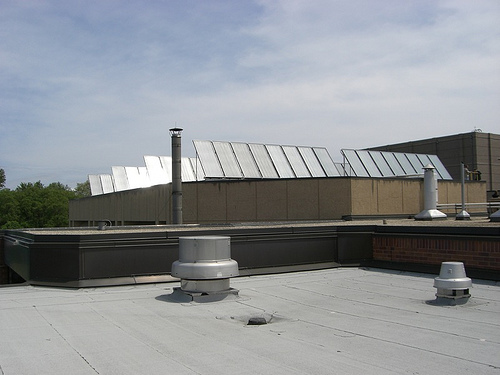
Governors State University Solar-thermal Systems

In 2008, GSU renovated several parking lots, replacing asphalt with permeable pavers—interlocking bricks that allow rainwater to seep down, trapping heavy metals and pollutants before they enter storm sewers. GSU is also home to one of the state's largest solar-thermal systems, which preheats water for the campus swimming pool and provides about one-third of the domestic hot water for the university's main building.

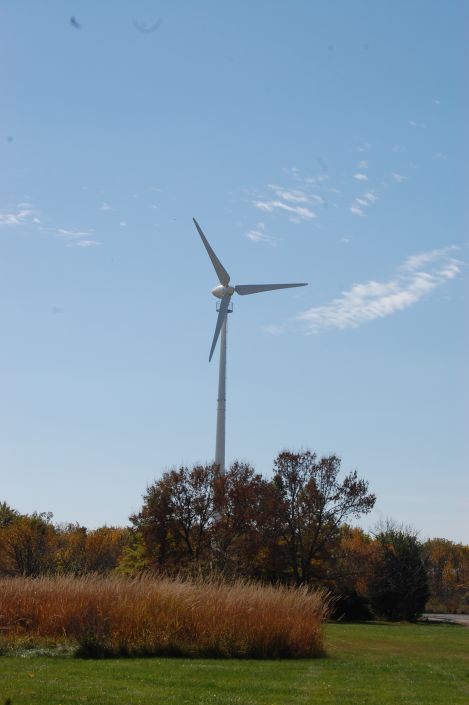
Governors State University's wind turbine

On October 21, 2010, Warren Ribley, director of the Illinois Department of Commerce and Economic Opportunity, announced a $153,000 grant for the 50-kilowatt wind turbine to be located on the University Park campus. With the installation of an on-campus wind turbine, Governors State University will continue reducing its greenhouse gas emissions, and move toward its goal of becoming Illinois’ "greenest" university. The wind turbine will give Governors State a clean, renewable source of energy, and also be incorporated into the university's academic programs.

On October 18, 2011, GSU held a groundbreaking ceremony for the beginning of the renovation of the university's science facilities. The $22.6 million, three year renovation project will create state-of-the-art education facilities while providing more than 130 construction jobs. In addition to the positive impact the renovation project will have on the region's economy, the building renovation will better equip GSU to educate students for regional jobs in healthcare, computer science, scientific, and mathematics research, and science and math education. The area to be renovated comprises approximately 76,000 square feet (7,100 m^{2}) of space. During the renovation, crews will replace HVAC, electrical, plumbing, and lighting systems. Outmoded infrastructure and equipment will be replaced with modern facilities and equipment that will be energy-efficient and meet current codes and regulations. The project design calls for structural infill of existing atrium space, adding about 9,000 square feet (840 m^{2}) of additional usable space. The renovated facilities will serve students and faculty in biology, chemistry, computer science, mathematics, nursing, communication disorders, occupational therapy, and physical therapy.

=== University Park station ===
University Park station opened in 1977, located adjacent to the GSU property along University Parkway. The station is the southern terminus of the Metra Electric District mainline and is 31.5 miles (50.7 km) away from the northern terminus at Millennium Station in downtown Chicago.

== Academics ==
GSU has the following colleges:

- Arts and Sciences
- Business
- Education
- Health and Human Services

The university is accredited by the Higher Learning Commission. The business programs are accredited by the Association to Advance Collegiate Schools of Business (AACSB) and the public administration program is accredited by the National Association of Schools of Public Affairs and Administration (NASPAA). The university is also a member of the Illinois Council of Baccalaureate and Higher Degree Programs.

Academic rankings

Regional
- U.S. News & World Report: 127-166 in Regional Universities Midwest

== Athletics ==
GSU Jaguars wordmark

The Governors State (GSU) athletic teams are called the Jaguars. The university is a member of the National Association of Intercollegiate Athletics (NAIA), primarily competing the Chicagoland Collegiate Athletic Conference (CCAC) since the 2016–17 academic year. The Jaguars previously competed as an NAIA Independent within the Association of Independent Institutions (AII) during the 2015–16 school year.

GSU competes in fourteen intercollegiate varsity sports: Men's sports include basketball, cross country, golf, soccer, and indoor and outdoor track and field; while women's sports include basketball, bowling, cross country, golf, soccer, indoor and outdoor track and field and volleyball.

=== History ===
The addition of the intercollegiate athletic competition in the fall of 2014 coincided with expansion of the university's academic offerings to a four-year curriculum and admission acceptance of GSU's first freshman class. GSU was accepted into membership by the NAIA for the 2015–16 school year. Initially competing as an NAIA Independent, the university gained membership in the CCAC starting in the 2016–17 school year. GSU's athletic program began with seven sports: men's and women's basketball, cross country and golf, and women's volleyball. The university also announced plans to grow the athletic department, adding baseball, softball, and men's and women's soccer in the coming years. Governors State's expanded athletics to field varsity men's and women's soccer starting in the August 2019.

== Notable people ==
=== Notable alumni ===
The university has more than 57,000 graduates who live in the United States and elsewhere.

- Muhal Richard Abrams, educator, administrator, composer, arranger, clarinetist, cellist, and jazz pianist in the free jazz medium
- DuShon Monique Brown, American actress, best known her roles on the television series Prison Break and Chicago Fire
- Jerry Butler, singer, songwriter and Cook County commissioner
- Curtis J. Crawford, computer systems engineer and businessman
- William Davis, member of the Illinois House of Representatives
- Jason Ervin, Chicago alderman
- Thomas Fuentes, former Assistant Director of the Federal Bureau of Investigation (FBI), and current Law Enforcement Analyst for CNN
- Susie Sadlowski Garza, Chicago alderman
- Debbie Halvorson, United States congresswoman and Illinois state senator
- Carl Hoecker, Inspector general of the U.S. Securities and Exchange Commission
- Richard F. Kelly, member of the Illinois House of Representatives and businessman
- Von Mansfield, a former defensive back in the National Football League
- Steve Miller, coach and athletic director at Kansas State University, executive at Nike, director of Professional Bowlers Association
- Bob Petty, American television reporter and news anchor for WLS-TV
- Josh Harms, member of the Illinois House of Representatives
- Herb Schumann, Cook County commissioner
- Joseph C. Szabo, twelfth Federal Railroad Administrator of the United States
- Alicia Tate-Nadeau, first Woman to be promoted as a general in the Illinois Army National Guard; the executive director of the Chicago Office of Emergency Management and Communications; Director of Homeland Security and the Illinois Emergency Management Agency (IEMA) under Illinois Governor J. B. Pritzker.
- Malachi Thompson, avant-garde jazz trumpet player
- Chastity Wells-Armstrong (born 1971/1972), first African-American to serve as mayor of Kankakee, Illinois
- Sheryl Underwood, comedian and actress

=== Notable faculty ===
- Daniel Nearing, screenwriter and director of the films Chicago Heights and Hogtown

== See also ==
- Hosty v. Carter
