= Winesburg, Ohio =

1919 short story cycle by Sherwood Anderson

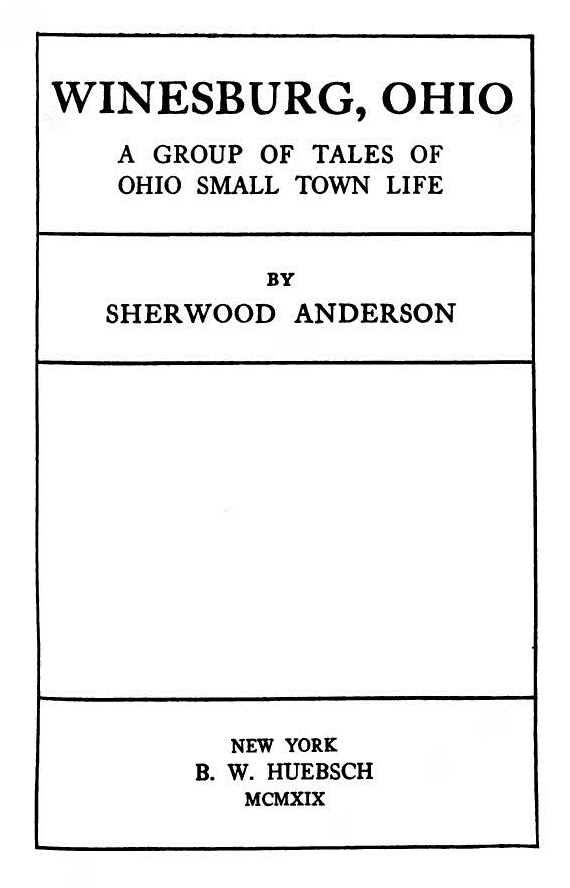
- First edition title page
- Author: Sherwood Anderson
- Language: English
- Genre: Short story cycle
- Publisher: B. W. Huebsch
- Publication date: May 8, 1919 (1st edition)
- Publication place: United States
- Media type: Print (hardback & paperback)
- OCLC: 607825
- Dewey Decimal: 813.52

Winesburg, Ohio (full title: Winesburg, Ohio: A Group of Tales of Ohio Small-Town Life) is a 1919 short story cycle by the American author Sherwood Anderson. The work is structured around the life of protagonist George Willard, from the time he was a child to his growing independence and ultimate abandonment of Winesburg as a young man. It is set in the fictional town of Winesburg, Ohio (not to be confused with the actual Winesburg, Ohio), which is loosely based on Anderson's childhood memories of Clyde, Ohio.

Mostly written from late 1915 to early 1916, with a few stories completed closer to publication, they were "...conceived as complementary parts of a whole, centered in the background of a single community." The book consists of twenty-two stories, with the first story, "The Book of the Grotesque", serving as an introduction. Each of the stories shares a specific character's past and present struggle to overcome the loneliness and isolation that seem to permeate the town. Stylistically, because of its emphasis on the psychological insights of characters over plot, and plainspoken prose, Winesburg, Ohio is known as one of the earliest works of Modernist literature.

Winesburg, Ohio was received well by critics despite some reservations about its moral tone and unconventional storytelling. Though its reputation waned in the 1930s, it has since rebounded and is now considered one of the most influential portraits of pre-industrial small-town life in the United States.

In 1998, the Modern Library ranked Winesburg, Ohio 24th on its list of the 100 best English-language novels of the 20th century.

== Genre ==
Though there is practically no argument about the unity of structure within Winesburg, Ohio, few scholars have concluded that it fits the standards of a conventional novel. Instead, it is typically placed "...midway between the novel proper and the mere collection of stories," known as the short story cycle. Aside from its structural unity, the common setting, characters, symbolism and "consistency of mood" are all additional qualities that tie the stories together despite their initial publication as separate tales.

Promoted to younger writers by Anderson himself, Winesburg, Ohio has served as a representative early example of the modern short story cycle in American letters. Comparisons between Winesburg, Ohio and Jean Toomer's Cane (1923), Ernest Hemingway's In Our Time (1925), William Faulkner's Go Down, Moses (1942), and several of John Steinbeck's works, among others, demonstrate the pervasiveness of the formal innovations made in Anderson's book.

The focus on George Willard's development as a young man and a writer has also led some critics to put Winesburg, Ohio within the tradition of "the American boy book, the Bildungsroman, and the Künstlerroman".

== Setting ==
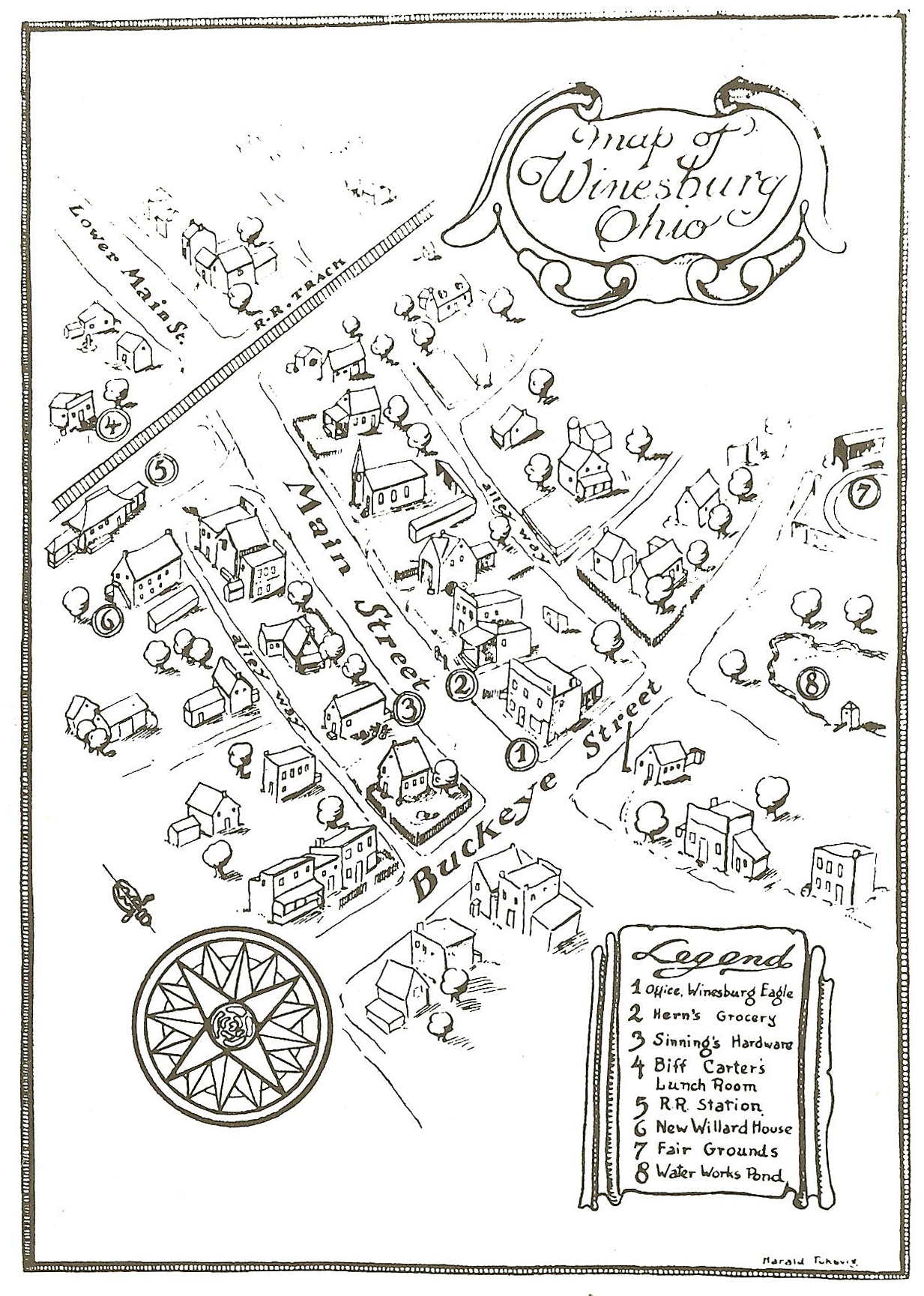
Map of fictional town of Winesburg from the 1st edition of Winesburg, Ohio.

It is widely acknowledged that the fictional model of the book's town, Winesburg, is based on Sherwood Anderson's boyhood memories of Clyde, Ohio, where Anderson lived between the ages of eight and nineteen (1884–1896), and not the actual town of Winesburg, Ohio. This view is supported by the similarities between the names and qualities of several Winesburg characters and Clyde's townspeople, in addition to mentions of specific geographic details of Clyde and the surrounding area.

It is not known why Anderson chose the name Winesburg for the town in the book. What is known is that the name was not necessarily determined by the stories themselves. In actuality, Anderson had been using Winesburg, Ohio, as a base for Talbot Whittingham, the protagonist of an unfinished novel he had been writing on-and-off for several years prior to the composition of the Winesburg stories.

A direct relationship between the real Clyde and the fictional Winesburg, however, remains the supposition of scholars. Anderson wrote in A Writer's Conception of Realism that he reacted with "shock" when he "...heard people say that one of my own books Winesburg, Ohio, was an exact picture of Ohio village life." The author went on to admit that, "the hint for almost every character was taken from my fellow lodgers in a large rooming house..." These lodgers were the "...young musicians, young writers, painters, actors..." and others that lived in proximity to Anderson on the North Side of Chicago and to whom he referred as "The Little Children of the Arts". The truth probably lies somewhere in between, with memories of Clyde "merging" with Anderson's interactions at the boardinghouse.

== Literary sources ==
It is difficult to say that any specific writer or work influenced Winesburg, Ohio as a whole because Anderson was ambiguous about the matter. Still, most scholars affirm the obvious connection between Anderson's cycle and the Spoon River Anthology of Edgar Lee Masters (published in April 1915), which Anderson reportedly stayed up all night to read. Though B.W. Huebsch, Anderson's publisher, sent out a statement, upon the release of Winesburg, Ohio, heading off comparisons between the two works by stating (erroneously, as it turns out) that the Winesburg stories were printed in magazines before the Spoon River Anthology was published, the similarities in small-town setting, structure, and mood of the works have been noted by several reviewers, with one going so far as to call Winesburg, Ohio, the Spoon River Anthology "...put into prose."

Gertrude Stein, whose work Anderson was introduced to by either his brother Karl or photographer Alfred Stieglitz between 1912 and 1915, is also said to have played a key role in helping shape the unique style found in the stories. Through his interaction (at first satirizing it before ultimately accepting it as essential to his development) with Stein's Three Lives (1909) and Tender Buttons (1914), Anderson found the plain, unambiguous voice that became a staple of his prose. As indicated by the correspondence the two writers developed after the publication of Winesburg, Ohio, variations on the repetition found in Stein's writing in addition to their mutual appreciation for the sentence as a basic unit of prose were also likely features of her writing that Anderson noticed and drew upon in writing his Winesburg, Ohio. Literary critic Irving Howe summarized the pair's connection aptly when he wrote, "Stein was the best kind of influence: she did not bend Anderson to her style, she liberated him for his own."

Numerous other writers and works have been mentioned as possible sources from which the elements of Winesburg, Ohio were drawn, most of them either denied or unacknowledged by Anderson himself. The influence of Theodore Dreiser and the Russians (Chekhov, Dostoevsky, and Tolstoy) were discounted by the author, the former for stylistic reasons, the latter because he had apparently not read them prior to writing his book. While Anderson expressed an admiration for Ivan Turgenev's A Sportsman's Sketches, the affinities between Turgenev's novel and Winesburg, Ohio ("...both are episodic novels containing loosely bound but closely related sketches, both depend for impact less on dramatic action than on climactic lyrical insight, and in both the individual sketches frequently end with bland understatements that form an ironic coda to the body of the writing") may not be a sign of influence since it is not known whether Anderson read the book before writing Winesburg, Ohio. Finally, the regional focus on the Midwest has been linked to the writing of Mark Twain, particularly The Adventures of Huckleberry Finn, and while Anderson read and revered Twain, the connection between Twain and Winesburg, Ohio has largely been made by scholars seeking to place the book within the canon of American literature, not necessarily by the author.

== Composition and publication ==
According to Anderson's account, the first of the stories that became Winesburg, Ohio (probably "The Book of the Grotesque") was composed, on the spur of the moment, in the middle of the night, probably while he was staying on the third floor of a rooming house at 735 Cass Street in Chicago: "...it was a late fall night and raining...I was there naked in the bed and I sprang up. I went to my typewriter and began to write. It was there, under those circumstances, myself sitting near an open window, the rain occasionally blowing in and wetting my bare back, that I did my first writing...I wrote it, as I wrote them all, complete in the one sitting...The rest of the stories in the book came out of me on succeeding evenings, and sometimes during the day while I worked in the advertising office..." Study of his manuscripts shows that, though it is probably true that most of the stories were written within a relatively short span of time in late 1915, like a number of facts in Anderson's retelling of his writing process (for instance, his claim that he had written the Winesburg, Ohio stories after his earlier books were already published), it is inaccurate to say that the final versions of the stories published in 1919 were exactly the same as the ones written whole four years earlier.

In fact, in his seminal article "How Sherwood Anderson wrote Winesburg, Ohio," William L. Phillips wrote that the manuscript of "Hands" contained "...almost two hundred instances in which earlier words and phrases are deleted, changed, or added to..." though no major structural changes to the story were detected. Additionally, slightly different versions of ten stories that ended up in the book were published by three literary magazines between 1916 and 1918 as follows:

Story Title	Magazine Name	Publication Date
"The Book of the Grotesque"	Masses	February 1916
"Hands"	Masses	March 1916
"Paper Pills" (as "The Philosopher")	Little Review	June–July 1916
"The Strength of God"	Masses	August 1916
"Queer"	Seven Arts	December 1916
"The Untold Lie"	Seven Arts	January 1917
"Mother"	Seven Arts	March 1917
"The Thinker"	Seven Arts	September 1917
"The Man of Ideas"	Little Review	June 1918
"An Awakening"	Little Review	December 1918

Though the stories were published to some acclaim in literary circles, John Lane, the publisher of Anderson's first two novels, referred to the Winesburg, Ohio stories as "too gloomy" and refused to publish them. It was not until editor Francis Hackett showed the manuscript to Ben Huebsch, owner and editor of a small publishing house in New York, that the stories (Huebsch suggested calling them "Winesburg, Ohio") were brought together and published.

== The stories ==
The cycle consists of twenty-two short stories, one of which consists of four parts: (Note: The formatting of the story titles, particularly the italics, em-dashes, and the quotations around "Queer" are consistent with the style of the book's numerous editions. For two examples see Winesburg, Ohio (Modern Library/Random House, 1947) and Anderson (W.W. Norton, 1996).)

- The Book of the Grotesque
- Hands—concerning Wing Biddlebaum
- Paper Pills—concerning Doctor Reefy
- Mother—concerning Elizabeth Willard
- The Philosopher—concerning Doctor Parcival
- Nobody Knows—concerning Louise Trunnion
- Godliness
  - Parts I and II—concerning Jesse Bentley
  - Surrender (Part III)—concerning Louise Bentley
  - Terror (Part IV)—concerning David Hardy
- A Man of Ideas—concerning Joe Welling
- Adventure—concerning Alice Hindman
- Respectability—concerning Wash Williams
- The Thinker—concerning Seth Richmond
- Tandy—concerning Tandy Hard
- The Strength of God—concerning The Reverend Curtis Hartman
- The Teacher—concerning Kate Swift
- Loneliness—concerning Enoch Robinson
- An Awakening—concerning Belle Carpenter
- "Queer"—concerning Elmer Cowley
- The Untold Lie—concerning Ray Pearson
- Drink—concerning Tom Foster
- Death—concerning Doctor Reefy and Elizabeth Willard
- Sophistication—concerning Helen White
- Departure—concerning George Willard

The book is written as a third-person omniscient narrative with the narrator occasionally breaking away from the story to directly address the reader or make self-conscious comments (in "Hands", after describing the poignant nature of the story, he writes that "It is a job for a poet", later in the same story adding, "It needs a poet there".) These remarks appear less often as the book progresses.

Though each story's title notes one character, there are a total of over 100 characters named in the book, some appearing only once and some recurring several times. According to literary scholar Forrest L. Ingram, "George Willard [recurs] in all but six stories; 33 characters each appear in more than one story (some of them five and six times). Ninety-one characters appear only once in the cycle (ten of these are central protagonists in their stories)." Within the stories, characters figure in anecdotes that cover a relatively large time period; much of the action takes place during George's teenage years, but there are also episodes that go back several generations (particularly in "Godliness"), approximately twenty years ("Hands"), and anywhere in between. Indeed, the climactic scenes of two stories, "The Strength of God" and "The Teacher", are actually juxtaposed over the course of one stormy January evening. As Malcolm Cowley writes in his introduction to the 1960 Viking edition of Winesburg, Ohio, Anderson's "...instinct was to present everything together, as in a dream".

== Major themes ==
The major themes of Winesburg, Ohio largely concern the interaction between the individual citizens of Winesburg and the world around them. As each of the book's stories focuses primarily (though not exclusively) on one character, the narrator develops these themes continuously, sometimes adding new insights about previously introduced characters. (Elizabeth Willard's relationship with Dr. Reefy in "Death,” for example, was never alluded to when she was first introduced in "Mother.”) Because George Willard is a fixture in much of the book, his character arc becomes just as important a theme of Winesburg, Ohio as that of the rest of the town's inhabitants.

=== Inability to communicate, loneliness, and isolation ===
The most prevalent theme in Winesburg, Ohio is the interplay between how the Winesburg citizens' "...inability to translate inner feelings into outward form" expresses itself in the loneliness and isolation that makes their various adventures noteworthy. This dynamic is present, in some form, in practically all of the stories, three fairly representative examples being the merchant's son, Elmer Cowley, in the story "Queer,” George's mother, Elizabeth Willard, in the stories "Mother" and "Death,” and Jessie Bentley in "Godliness.”

In the former, the young man Elmer Cowley, incited by an imagined slight ("He thought that the boy who passed and repassed Cowley & Son's store ... must be thinking of him and perhaps laughing at him" when in reality, "[George] had long been wanting to make friends with the young merchant...") tries twice to tell George off but is unable to communicate his feelings either time, finally physically assaulting the young reporter. The story ends with Cowley telling himself, "I showed him ... I guess I showed him. I guess I showed him I ain't so queer", a proclamation obviously laced with dramatic irony.

In the latter two stories, Elizabeth Willard was the "tall and gaunt...ghostly figure [moving] slowly through the halls..." of the New Willard House who eventually, in "Death,” succumbs to illness. In her youth, Elizabeth "...had been 'stage-struck' and, wearing loud clothes, paraded the streets with traveling men from her father's hotel“. She was a character who, "perhaps more than any of the other characters, seeks some kind of release from her perpetual loneliness". And yet, aside from her very brief love affair with Dr. Reefy, Elizabeth Willard finds no solace. Instead, both of her stories conclude with Elizabeth Willard attempting to communicate with her son but, like the dumbfounded Elmer Cowley, winding up unsuccessful.

=== Escaping isolation ===
In contrast with the stark view of Winesburg, Ohio above, a number of scholars have taken the perspective that the cycle is, in fact, about escape from isolation instead of the condition itself. Barry D. Bort writes, "Criticism of Winesburg, Ohio has recognized this desperate need to communicate, but what has not been understood about Anderson's work is that this continual frustration serves as the context out of which arise a few luminous moments of understanding... Such moments are at the heart of Winesburg, Ohio, although they are few and evanescent". Though rarely does escape come in the narrative present, many of the stories prominently feature anecdotes of past adventures where lonely and reserved characters run naked through the town on a rainy night (Alice Hindman in "Adventure"), drive their wagon headlong into a speeding locomotive (Windpeter Winters in "The Untold Lie"), and have window-shattering religious epiphanies (Reverend Curtis Hartman in "The Strength of God"). While not all of the adventures are so dramatic, each has its place in the annals of the town, sometimes as told to George Willard, other times in the memories of participants.

=== George Willard's coming-of-age ===
George Willard, a young reporter for the Winesburg Eagle, figures prominently in much of Winesburg, Ohio. (Note: As noted in Ingram (1971: 151), George appears in all but six of the stories.) Throughout the book, he plays the dual role of listener and recorder of other people's stories and advice, and the young representative of the town's hopes whose coming-of-age reaches its dénouement in the final tale, "Departure,” when George leaves Winesburg for the city. Much of George's story is centered around two interconnected threads: those of his sexual and artistic maturation. Most of the time, these two formative elements proceed together; it is solely when George loses his virginity to Louise Trunnion in "Nobody Knows" that the adventure is exclusively sexual. Afterwards, starting with his desire to fall in love with Helen White in order to have material for a love story in "The Thinker,” the desire for sexual fulfillment becomes linked to his literary/emotional sensibility.

In "The Teacher,” a central point in George's development, "Kate Swift, George's school teacher, realizes his literary potential..." and tries to communicate her thoughts to George but, "...his sexual desire kindles her own, and she loses touch with the intellectual, spiritual, and creative potentials of her emotion. At last, however, George begins to perceive that there is something more to be communicated between men and women than physical encounter..." Yet this lesson is not solidified for the young reporter when, after boasting in a bar in the story "An Awakening,” he has a surge of "masculine power" and tries to seduce Belle Carpenter, only to be repelled and humiliated by her beau, the large-fisted bartender, Ed Handby.

The climax of George's sexual and artistic coming-of-age comes in the second-to-last story of the collection, "Sophistication". Early in the story, while walking amongst the crowds of the Winesburg County Fair, George felt "...a thing known to men and unknown to boys. He felt old and little tired...[and]...he wanted someone to understand the feeling that had taken possession of him after his mother's death [an event that took place in, "Death,” the previous story]". That someone turned out to be Helen White, who herself had "...come to a period of change". It is in the time they spend together that readers see "his acceptance of Helen as a spiritual mediator..." which signifies that "...George's masculinity is balanced by the feminine qualities of tenderness and gentleness, an integration that Anderson suggests is necessary for the artist."

== Style ==
The style of Winesburg, Ohio has often been placed at various points in the spectrum between the naturalism of Anderson's literary predecessor, William Dean Howells (who died almost one year after the publication of the book), contemporaries Theodore Dreiser and Sinclair Lewis, and the Modernist writers of the Lost Generation. In what has been dubbed a "New Realism", Winesburg, Ohio surpasses the notion of the novel as an "objective report" by making use of "lyrical, nostalgic, evocative," even sentimental effects of nineteenth-century novels in its depictions of what lies beneath the psychological surface of a midwestern town. In the book, Anderson reoriented the facts typical of realist novels by incorporating his characters' inner beliefs about themselves as part of "reality".

The symbolism in Winesburg, Ohio plays a large role in allowing for this reorientation. Beginning with the idea of characters as grotesques whose "...grotesqueness is not merely a shield of deformity; it is also a remnant of misshapen feelings, what Dr. Reefy in the sketch 'Paper Pills' calls 'the sweetness of the twisted apples'". The irony of the sweet, but twisted (meaning, in the sentimental Victorian tradition, internally inferior), apples is that they are compared to Dr. Reefy's own knuckles that make a habit of stuffing crumpled notes bearing his thoughts unread into his pockets (itself a symbol of the "ineffectuality of human thought"). Wing Biddlebaum, the subject of the story "Hands", likewise was "...forever striving to conceal [his hands] in his pockets or behind his back". For Wing, his hands were "...the very index of his humanity", with the potential to symbolize a continuum going from a general fear of sexuality to sublimated homosexuality. Wing Biddlebaum and Dr. Reefy are just two examples of how throughout Winesburg, Ohio, Anderson builds myriad themes by adding symbolic significance to gestures, weather conditions and time of day, and events, among other features of the stories.

Another major characteristic of Winesburg, Ohio that separates its style from Anderson's contemporaries, as well as his previous novels, is the minimal role of plot. According to critic David Stouk's article "Anderson's Expressionist Art", "As an expressionist drama, there is little development of a story line in the Winesburg tales in term of cause and effect." Indeed, it is this de-emphasis of traditional story elements in lieu of experimentation with language that provides both a link and a rift between Winesburg, Ohio and the novels of the following decades; whereas the simple, stripped-down vernacular that Gertrude Stein found so appealing in Anderson's writing of the time became an exemplar of quintessential American style most famously associated with Ernest Hemingway, the expressionistic portrayal of emotional states in Winesburg, Ohio was later, by some critics, considered "undisciplined" and "vague".

== Literary significance and criticism ==
The critical reception to Winesburg, Ohio upon its publication in 1919 was mostly positive, even effusive. Hart Crane, for example, wrote that "...America should read this book on her knees," while H.L. Mencken wrote that Winesburg, Ohio "...embodies some of the most remarkable writing done in America in our time". Despite criticism that Anderson's "sordid tales" were humorless, and "mired...in plotlessness", Winesburg, Ohio was reprinted several times, selling a total of about 3,000 copies by 1921. (Note: Phillips (1976: 153-154) discusses the early print runs and sales figures noting "Since sales and other records of the B.W. Huebsch publishing house have long since been destroyed, it is not possible to be certain about the quantity of each printing, but an estimate can be made from other evidence".)

The popularity of Winesburg, Ohio among readers and critics has remained fairly high but has fluctuated with Sherwood Anderson's literary reputation. His reputation, while steady through the 1920s, began to decline in the 1930s. William L. Phillips, following the lukewarm reception of The Letters of Sherwood Anderson in 1953, commented that "...Anderson is out of fashion." Throughout that decade, however, the author and his most popular book were the subject of a "...re-examination, if only as a neglected literary ancestor of the moderns." Into the 1960s and beyond, this "re-examination" became a "reevaluation" by critics who today generally consider Winesburg, Ohio a modern classic. Cleveland Review of Books reviewed the book after a new edition came out through Ohio University Press in 2019, calling it "a spotlight on the outcasts, of whom there are so many one may begin to wonder whether there exist any incasts." The Pequod called it “one of the great modern short story collections… Anderson’s writing is of such consistently high quality that he is able to elevate the stories to the level of great poetry and even tragedy,” and rated the book a 9.5 (out of 10.0). In a 2011 review, Ploughshares praised the book, and specifically highlighted its “in-depth, fearless, summarized description of emotion.”

== Literary and cultural connections ==
=== In film ===
In the 1985 film Heaven Help Us, Danni reads a passage from "Sophistication" to her grief-stricken father.

In the 2003 film The Best of Youth (La meglio gioventù), Matteo Carati borrows Racconti dell'Ohio, the Italian translation of the book, from the library in Rome where he sees Mirella for the second time.

Daniel Nearing's 2009 independent film Chicago Heights was based on Winesburg, Ohio.

=== In literature ===
F. Scott Fitzgerald, in his wry reminiscence of the Jazz Age, summed up the lesson learned by the book's unsophisticated readers as the fact that "there's a lot of sex around if we only knew it".

Ray Bradbury has credited Winesburg, Ohio as an inspiration for his book The Martian Chronicles.

H. P. Lovecraft said that he wrote the short story "Arthur Jermyn" after he "had nearly fallen asleep over the tame backstairs gossip of Anderson's Winesburg, Ohio."

Henry Miller references the book on the first page of his novel Sexus (of The Rosy Crucifixion series).

Amos Oz writes in his autobiography A Tale of Love and Darkness that Winesburg, Ohio had a powerful influence on his writing, showing him that literature must not necessarily always be about heroes. Only after reading Anderson did he find the courage to start writing.

Philip Roth's 2008 novel Indignation is set, in part, at Winesburg College in Winesburg, Ohio. His protagonist holds a part-time job as a waiter at the "New Willard House", evoking the protagonist, George Willard, of Anderson's book.

Porter Shreve presents a possible sequel to Winesburg, Ohio in his novel The End of the Book.

=== In television ===
In the pilot episode of the AMC television series, Fear the Walking Dead, the novel Winesburg, Ohio is picked up in the church used as a drug den, from under a mattress, when character Madison Clark indicates it belongs to her son, Nick. Nick is shown reading and discussing the book in season 2, episode 8, which takes its title from the book's opening story.

In the ABC television series, Pretty Little Liars, the book is given to the character Aria Montgomery by her English teacher, Ezra Fitz, with whom she is having an affair. He writes the inscription "When you need to leave Rosewood... Ezra" on the first page.

In the sixth episode of second season of Mad Men, "Maidenform", Duck Phillips walks into the office of William Redd, who quickly puts down his copy of "Winesburg, Ohio".

In the 13th and final episode of the 6th Season of the Netflix series, Orange is the New Black, the character Nicky Nichols is seen carrying a copy of Winesburg, Ohio.

Nathaniel Halpern, the writer of the 2020 Amazon television series Tales from the Loop, drew inspiration from Winesburg, Ohio, its themes of loneliness and isolation, and its focus on small town characters.

== Adaptations ==
=== Film ===
On 3 August 1959, The New York Times announced a film adaptation to be produced by Mirisch Company for release by United Artists, Christopher Sergel to write the screenplay and Jeffrey Hayden to direct. This film was never made.

A TV version was made in 1973 directed by Ralph Senensky and starring Joseph and Timothy Bottoms as George Willard, Jean Peters as Elizabeth Willard, Curt Conway as Will Henderson, Norman Foster as Old Pete, Dabbs Greer as Parcival, Albert Salmi as Tom Willard, Laurette Spang as Helen White, and William Windom as Dr. Reefy.

In 2008 Winesburg, Ohio, a filmed adaptation of the novel, was produced by Jennifer Granville. It was screened at the Athens International Film and Video Festival. A companion documentary, Lost in Winesburg, directed by Tommy Britt, examined the legacy of Anderson's book by documenting present day small town Ohio and the attempt to adapt Anderson's book for the screen by the local community and Ohio University students, alumni, staff and faculty.

In 2010, Chicago Heights, a contemporary adaptation of the modular novel, premiered in competition at the Busan International Film Festival and appeared in multiple additional festivals. Noted film critic Roger Ebert said "it is a beautiful book, and has inspired this beautiful film," and later listed Chicago Heights among the Best Art Films of 2010. The film was directed by Daniel Nearing, written by Nearing and Rudy Thauberger, and stars Andre Truss, Keisha Dyson and Gerrold Johnson.

=== Stage ===
A stage adaptation of Winesburg, Ohio by Sherwood Anderson (initially in collaboration with playwright Arthur Barton) was performed at the Hedgerow Theatre in Rose Valley, Pennsylvania in 1934. Directed by Jasper Deeter, it achieved some success, running from June through September of that year. Charles Scribner's Sons published this version of the play alongside three one-act plays (Triumph of an Egg, Mother, and They Married Later), also by Anderson, as Plays: Winesburg and Others in 1937.

A Broadway production played for 13 performances in February 1958 at the Nederlander Theatre (then known as the National Theatre). The adaptation, written by Christopher Sergel, starred Ben Piazza as George Willard, James Whitmore as Tom Willard, Sandra Church as Helen White, and Leon Ames as Dr. Reefy.

Four of the stories from Winesburg, Ohio were staged in 2001 at the Julia Morgan Theater in Berkeley, California. Word for Word Performing Arts Company and the Shotgun Players adapted "A Man of Ideas", "Paper Pills", "Surrender", and "Hands". The production was nominated for five San Francisco Bay Area Theatre Critics Circle Awards (Entire Production – Drama, Supporting Performance – Female, Director, Sound Design, and Ensemble Performance).

The whole cycle was adapted into a musical and premiered in 2002 at the Steppenwolf Theatre in Chicago, Illinois. The book and lyrics were written by Eric Rosen (in collaboration with Andrew Pluess, Ben Sussman, and Jessica Thebus). Following its 2002 premiere, the musical was featured as part of the About Face Theatre Company's 2003–2004 season. The About Face production received the two Jeff Awards for New Adaptation and Actor in a Supporting Role-Musical. A 2006 production of the musical by the Arden Theatre Company (Philadelphia) won the Barrymore Award for "Outstanding Musical".

A loose musical adaptation of Winesburg, Ohio written by Kevin Kuhlke with music by Heaven Phillips premiered in 2003 as Winesburg: Small Town Life at the Perseverance Theatre in Juneau, Alaska.

== Sources ==
- Anderson, David D. (1994). "Mark Twain, Sherwood Anderson, and Midwestern Modernism". in Anderson, David D. (ed). Midamerica XXI: The Yearbook of the Society for the Study of Midwestern Literature. East Lansing, MI: Midwestern Press.
- Anderson, Sherwood (1942). Sherwood Anderson's Memoirs. New York: Harcourt, Brace.
- Anderson, Sherwood (1947). "A Writer's Conception of Realism". in Rosenfeld, Paul (ed). The Sherwood Anderson Reader. Boston: Houghton Mifflin.
- Anderson, Sherwood (1977). "Dreiser". in Gregory, Horace (ed). The Portable Sherwood Anderson. New York: Penguin. ISBN 0-14-015076-5
- Anderson, Sherwood (1996). "Winesburg, Ohio". in Winesburg, Ohio: A Norton Critical Edition New York: W.W. Norton. ISBN 0-393-96795-6
- Anderson, Sherwood (1996a). "Sherwood Anderson's Memoirs". in Modlin, Charles E. and White, Ray Lewis (eds). Winesburg, Ohio: A Norton Critical Edition New York: W.W. Norton. ISBN 0-393-96795-6
- Anonymous. "A Gutter Would Be Spoon River". New York Sun (1 June 1919), 3.
- Anonymous (1996). "Sordid Tales". New York Evening Post (1 June 1919). in Modlin, Charles E. and White, Ray Lewis (eds). Winesburg, Ohio: A Norton Critical Edition New York: W.W. Norton. ISBN 0-393-96795-6
- Anonymous (October 1937). Plays: Winesburg and Others. Theatre Arts Monthly 21: 824–25.
- Bort, Barry D. (Summer, 1970). "Winesburg, Ohio: The Escape from Isolation." The Midwest Quarterly 11 (4): 443–456. (Link is to what looks like part of the article.)
- Bradbury, Ray (1990). "Run Fast, Stand Still, or, The Thing at the Top of the Stairs, or, New Ghosts from Old Minds". in Zen in the Art of Writing. Santa Barbara, CA: Joshua Odell Editions. ISBN 1-877741-02-7
- Brown, Lynda (Summer 1990). "Anderson's Wing Biddlebaum and Freeman's Louisa Ellis". Studies in Short Fiction 27 (3): 413–414.
- Cowley, Malcolm (1974). "Introduction to Winesburg, Ohio". in Rideout, Walter B. (ed). Sherwood Anderson: Collection of Critical Essays. Englewood Hills, NJ: Prentice-Hall. ISBN 0-13-036558-0
- Crane, Hart (September 1919). "Sherwood Anderson". Pagan 4: 60–61.
- Crowley, John W. (1990). "Introduction". in Crowley, John W. (ed). New Essays on Winesburg, Ohio. Cambridge: Cambridge UP. ISBN 0-521-38283-1
- Duffey, Bernard (1966). "From The Chicago Renaissance in American Letters: A Critical History". in White, Ray Lewis (ed). The Achievement of Sherwood Anderson: Essays in Criticism. Chapel Hill, NC: University of North Carolina. OCLC 276748
- Dunne, Robert (2005). A New Book of the Grotesque: Contemporary Approaches to Sherwood Anderson's Early Fiction. Kent: Kent State UP. ISBN 0-87338-827-5
- Evans, Robert C. (2010) "Sherwood Anderson". in Gantt, Patricia M. (series ed). Student's Encyclopedia of Great American Writers: Volume III: 1900-1945. New York: Facts on File, Inc. ISBN 978-0-8160-6087-0
- Fussell, Edwin (1966). "Winesburg, Ohio: Art and Isolation". in White, Ray Lewis (ed). The Achievement of Sherwood Anderson: Essays in Criticism. Chapel Hill, NC: University of North Carolina. OCLC 276748
- Geismer, Maxwell (1947) The Last of the Provincials: The American Novel, 1915–1925. Boston: Houghton Mifflin.
- Hatcher, Harlan (1935) Creating the Modern American Novel. Murray Hill, NY: Farrar & Rinehart.
- Hoffman, Frederick J. (1951). The Modern Novel in America: 1900–1950. Chicago: Henry Regnery.
- Howe, Irving (1951). Sherwood Anderson. New York: William Sloane Associates.
- Howe, Irving (1965). "Sherwood Anderson: Winesburg, Ohio". in Stegner, Wallace (ed.) The American Novel: From James Fenimore Cooper to William Faulkner. New York: Basic Books. ISBN 0-465-00155-6
- Howe, Irving (1966). "The Book of the Grotesque". in White, Ray Lewis (ed). The Achievement of Sherwood Anderson: Essays in Criticism. Chapel Hill, NC: University of North Carolina. OCLC 276748
- Ingram, Forrest L. (1971). Representative Short Story Cycles of the Twentieth Century. The Netherlands: Mouton & Co.. ISBN 90-279-1848-1
- Lee, Brian (1987). American Fiction: 1865–1940. London: Longman. ISBN 0-582-49316-1
- Madden, Fred (1997) "Expressionist contours in Sherwood Anderson's fiction". The Midwest Quarterly 38 (4): 363–371.
- Maresca, Carol J. (March 1966). "Gestures as Meaning in Sherwood Anderson's Winesburg, Ohio". CLA Journal 9 (3): 279–283.
- Mellard, James M. (October 1968). "Narrative Forms in Winesburg Ohio". PMLA 83 (5): 1304–1312.
- Mencken, H.L. "Book of Uncommon Merit". in Modlin, Charles E. and White, Ray Lewis (eds). Winesburg, Ohio: A Norton Critical Edition New York: W.W. Norton. ISBN 0-393-96795-6
- Morgan, Gwendolyn. (Fall 1989). "Anderson's 'Hands'". Explicator 48 (1): 46–47.
- Murphy, George D. (Summer 1967). "The Theme of Sublimation in Anderson's Winesburg, Ohio". Modern Fiction Studies 13 (2): 237–246.
- Phillips, William L. (1951). "How Sherwood Anderson Wrote Winesburg, Ohio". American Literature 23 (1): 7–30.
- Phillips, William L. (1966) "Sherwood Anderson's Two Prize Pupils". in White, Ray Lewis (ed). The Achievement of Sherwood Anderson: Essays in Criticism. Chapel Hill, NC: University of North Carolina. OCLC 276748
- Phillips, William L. (1976) "The Editions of Winesburg, Ohio". in Campbell, Hilbert H. and Modlin, Charles E.A (eds). Sherwood Anderson: Centennial Studies. Troy, NY: Whitston Publishing Company. ISBN 0-87875-093-2
- Rideout, Walter B. (1969). "Sherwood Anderson". in Bryer, Jackson R. (ed). Fifteen Modern American Authors: A Survey of Research and Criticism. Durham, NC: Duke University Press.
- Rideout, Walter B. (1974). "Introduction". in Rideout, Walter B. (ed.) Sherwood Anderson: Collection of Critical Essays. Englewood Cliffs, NJ: Prentice-Hall. ISBN 0-13-036533-5
- Rideout, Walter B. (1996). "The Simplicity of Winesburg, Ohio". in Modlin, Charles E. and White, Ray Lewis (eds). Winesburg, Ohio: A Norton Critical Edition New York: W.W. Norton. ISBN 0-393-96795-6
- Reist, John S. (1993). "An Ellipse Becomes a Circle: The Developing Unity of Winesburg, Ohio." CEA Critic 55 (3): 26–38. Accessed through the Literature Resource Center on 21 April 2011. Gale Document Number: GALE|H1420102369. (accessible through most public libraries)
- Rigsbee, Sally Adair (1996). "The Feminine in Winesburg, Ohio". in Winesburg, Ohio: A Norton Critical Edition New York: W.W. Norton. ISBN 0-393-96795-6
- Ritzenberg, Aaron. (Fall 2010) "Holding on to the Sentimental in Winesburg, Ohio". Modern Fiction Studies, 56 (3): 496-515. Accessed on 2 May 2011.
- Spencer, Benjamin T. (March 1969). "Sherwood Anderson: Mythopoeist". American Literature 41 (1): 1–18.
- Stouck, David (1977). "Winesburg, Ohio as a Dance of Death". American Literature 48 (4): 525-542.
- Stouck, David (1996). "Anderson's Expressionist Art". in Modlin, Charles E. and White, Ray Lewis (eds). Winesburg, Ohio: A Norton Critical Edition New York: W.W. Norton. ISBN 0-393-96795-6
- Trilling, Lionel (1977). "Sherwood Anderson". in White, Ray Lewis (ed). The Achievement of Sherwood Anderson: Essays in Criticism. Chapel Hill, NC: University of North Carolina. OCLC 276748
- Updike, John (1996). "Twisted Apples". in Modlin, Charles E. and White, Ray Lewis (eds). Winesburg, Ohio: A Norton Critical Edition New York: W.W. Norton. ISBN 0-393-96795-6
- Westbrook, Max (1966). "Sherwood Anderson (1876–1941)". in Westbrook, Max (ed). The Modern American Novel: Essays in Criticism. New York: Random House. ISBN 0-394-30626-0
- White, Ray Lewis (1977) "Introduction". Sherwood Anderson: A Reference Guide. Boston: G.K. Hall & Co.. ISBN 0-8161-7818-6
