= Thomas Fuentes =

Tom Fuentes served as an Assistant Director of the Federal Bureau of Investigation (FBI) from 2004 to 2008. Fuentes served in the FBI for 29 years under various other positions as well.

== Early life ==
Fuentes was born and raised in Chicago, Illinois, to Cuban parents. He earned a Bachelor of Arts degree in Economics, Business Administration and Public Service Administration from Governors State University, University Park, Illinois.

== Career ==
Fuentes' 29-year career in the FBI included 11 years as a member of the U.S. Government's Senior Executive Service. Fuentes directed the FBI Office of International Operations, which included offices at FBI Headquarters in Washington, D.C. and 76 Legal Attaché offices in U.S. Embassies and Consulates worldwide. He was responsible for FBI Special Agents and Analysts assigned to the Interpol Washington, D.C. National Central Bureau office, United Nations, and General Secretariat office in Lyon, France as well as Europol Headquarters in The Hague, Netherlands. Fuentes was also an Assistant Director of the FBI from 2004 until his retirement in November 2008. He also served as a member of the Executive Committee of Interpol from 2006 through 2009. Earlier in his career, Fuentes served as Special Agent in Charge of the Indianapolis Division of the FBI. He was the first FBI executive on-scene commander in Iraq; Chief of the Organized Crime Section, FBI Headquarters (FBIHQ); Assistant Special Agent in Charge, San Francisco Division; Assistant Inspector, Inspection Division, FBIHQ; and Supervisor, Chicago Division.

Fuentes is a 2007 graduate of the FBI's National Executive Institute and is a member of the FBI National Academy Associates. He is a member of the International Association of Chiefs of Police (IACP). He served as a member of the IACP's International Policing Steering Committee, and the G8 Law Enforcement Projects Group.

After leaving the FBI, Fuentes became a Law Enforcement Analyst for CNN in which he served as a frequent on-air Contributor for news stories regarding U.S. and international law enforcement and national security matters. Fuentes is also President of Fuentes International, L.L.C., a consulting firm based in Washington, D.C. He has been an executive consultant to Tate, Inc., Palantir Technologies, Inc. and Deloitte Consulting, Inc. He is also a member of the U.S. State Department Overseas Security Advisory Council. In 2013, Fuentes received the Lifetime Achievement Award from the Society of Asian Federal Officers. In that same year he joined Morris & McDaniel, Inc. as Vice President for International Development.
