= Chasity Wells-Armstrong =

American politician and first African-American mayor of Kankakee

Village Manager of Maywood, Illinois
- In office June 8, 2021 – June 3, 2022
- Preceded by: Willie Norfleet Jr.

Mayor of Kankakee, Illinois
- In office May 1, 2017 – May 3, 2021
- Preceded by: Nina Epstein
- Succeeded by: Chris Curtis

Personal details
- Born: 1971 or 1972 (age 53–54)
- Political party: Democratic

Chasity Wells-Armstrong (born 1971/1972) is an American politician, the first African-American to serve as mayor of Kankakee, Illinois, the county seat of Kankakee County.

== Biography ==
Wells-Armstrong was raised on the east side of Kankakee and earned an associate degree from Kankakee Community College and a B.A. and M.A. from Governors State University. After school, she worked as deputy district director for Illinois Democratic Congressman Bill Foster, she served as board vice president for the Harbor House Domestic Violence Shelter, and as education chairwoman of the Kankakee County Branch of the NAACP. In May 2015, she was elected to the Kankakee City Council representing the city's 5th ward. In the April 4, 2017 mayoral election, she defeated two-term mayor Republican Nina Epstein (the city's first female mayor) by a vote of 1,918 to 1,703 with 2nd Ward alderman Jim Stokes running as an Independent a distant third with 455 votes. Kankakee was roughly 40% white, 40% Black, and 20% Hispanic at the time. She was sworn in on May 1, 2017. She is the city's first Democratic mayor since Russell Johnson who served from 1985 to 1993. While mayor, she secured over $14 million in COVID funding for the city and laid the groundwork for the revitalization of the Kankakee River. On April 6, 2021, she was defeated by 6th Ward Republican Alderman Christopher Curtis. Curtis was sworn in on May 3, 2021.

On June 8, 2021, she was appointed by the Maywood Board of Trustees in a 5–2 vote as the next village manager of Maywood, Illinois; she was sworn in after the vote. She replaced Willie Norfleet Jr. On June 3, 2022, the Maywood Board of Trustees voted 5–2 to suspend Chasity Wells-Armstrong as Village Manager.

== See also ==
- List of first African-American mayors

Preceded by Nina Epstein	Mayor of Kankakee, Illinois; 2017–2021	Succeeded by Chris Curtis
