= Brad Stevens (writer) =

British film critic and novelist

Brad Stevens is a British film critic and novelist based in the United Kingdom. He has written four books, and contributed to several magazines focusing on international cinema.

== Works ==
Stevens' first book, Monte Hellman: His Life and Films, was published in 2003. Reviewing the book for Variety (magazine), Allison Anders noted that, "Stevens succeeds in bringing the same rich humanity to Hellman's work that Hellman brings to each and every one of his characters". His second book, Abel Ferrara: The Moral Vision, appeared the following year.

Stevens regularly writes for print publications such as Sight & Sound; his Bradlands column appears every month on the magazine's website. He has also contributed to Cahiers du Cinéma, Video Watchdog, CineAction, The Dark Side (magazine), The Movie Book of the Western, the 2008 edition of The International Film Guide, the Senses of Cinema website and Defining Moments in Movies. He has worked on DVD and Blu-ray releases in various capacities, recording commentary tracks for the Masters of Cinema discs of Nosferatu and Tabu, and (in collaboration with Abel Ferrara) the Arrow discs of The Driller Killer and The Addiction, as well as writing sleeve notes for many films, including The Complete Buster Keaton Short Films, Ms. 45, La Notte, Obsession (1976 film), Thief, White of the Eye, The Long Goodbye, Blue Collar, Hardcore, Castle Keep, Wolf, Knightriders and Les Diaboliques. Stevens has appeared in several documentaries and can be seen interviewing Christopher Lee on VCI's DVD of The City of the Dead. He co-authored the English subtitles for F. J. Ossang's Dharma Guns (2010), and was on the jury at the Oldenburg International Film Festival in 2007.

Stevens is an advocate of the auteur theory, and his writings have earned him both praise and criticism. According to David Davidson, "Over the years, Brad Stevens has created his own canon of films...his own ‘Essential Cinema’...which does not look like any other list out there". Jonathan Rosenbaum has argued that, "Stevens is a pioneer in a new and rigorous if relatively unambulatory kind of film research ruled by the Internet and tracking down various videos and DVDs from around the world". James Rocarols described him as, "The high priest of (a) particular strain of rabid auteurism...always willing to go the extra mile in defending the latest duds from once-great directors".

Stevens has also written a feminist dystopian science-fiction novel entitled The Hunt, which was published by Vamptasy in 2014. He has described it as, "The Hunger Games meets Fifty Shades of Grey". The sequel, A Caution to Rattlesnakes, was published later the same year. 'The Hunt' was reissued, in a slightly revised edition, by Black Rose Writing in 2018.

=== Non-fiction ===
- Monte Hellman: His Life and Films (McFarland) 2003
- Abel Ferrara: The Moral Vision (FAB Press) 2004

=== Fiction ===
- The Hunt (Vamptasy) 2014 / (Black Rose Writing) 2018
- A Caution to Rattlesnakes (Vamptasy) 2014
