= Bob Petty =

American television reporter (1940–2020)

Robert Petty (November 26, 1940 – February 18, 2020) was an American television reporter and news anchor who spent nearly his entire career at Chicago's WLS-TV, retiring after 31 years with the station in 2002. Petty was born in Memphis, Tennessee. After graduating from Arizona State University in 1970, he became a general assignment reporter at WLS in 1971, becoming one of the station's first black reporters. By the late 1970s, he was an anchor for the station's Saturday Weekend News. Petty received the honorary degree of Doctor of Humane Letters at Governors State University in 2005 (adding a new title to his list of distinctions). This was the second Governors State degree Petty received from the university; he earned his master's degree in communications from the institution in 1979. In 1987, Petty was named as a William Benton Fellow at the University of Chicago. He was also inducted into the Hall of Fame at ASU's Cronkite School of Journalism in 2007. Petty died February 18, 2020, of lung cancer at age 79.
