= CineAction =

Canada-based film magazine

- Categories: Film
- Frequency: Three times per year
- Publisher: CineAction Collective
- Founded: 1985
- Country: Canada
- Based in: Toronto
- Website: cineaction.ca
- ISSN: 0826-9866 (print); 2562-2528 (web)

CineAction (formerly styled CineACTION!) is a Toronto-based, Marxist-oriented film magazine, published three times a year. Edited by an editorial collective that originally included critic Robin Wood, the magazine was founded in 1985 by members of the film department at Toronto's York University. The first 98 issues were published in print from 1985-2016. CineAction introduced its inaugural online issue (issue 99 "Politics & Cinema") in October 2018.

== Overview ==
CineAction began publishing in spring of 1985 (as CineAction! A Magazine of Radical Film Criticism and Theory with an exclamation mark), and reached its 70th issue mark in early 2007. In a lead editorial in its first issue, the collective wrote that the aim of the publication was to "provide, within the field of film criticism, alternatives to what is generally available. We want to steer a course between, on the one hand, the practice of journalistic reviewing (the expression of personal opinions, within an entertainment format) and, on the other, academic "criticism" of a certain type (detached from contemporary social realities and frequently inaccessible to the uninitiated)". The first issue then went on to offer articles on films such as A Matter of Time, Tell Me a Riddle, Death Watch, and The Night the Lights Went Out in Georgia. Among the first issue's contributors were Robin Wood, Richard Lippe, Bryan Bruce 2 (a.k.a. film director Bruce LaBruce), Florence Jacobowitz, Maureen Judge, and Lori Spring.

In subsequent issues, CineAction! (the logo dropped the exclamation point with the 23rd issue) went on to publish the work of Douglas Pye, V. F. Perkins, Scott Forsyth, Tony French, Tony Williams, Edward Gallafent, Brad Stevens (film critic/novelist), Deborah Thomas, Andrew Britton, and scores more. CineAction generally poses a theme for each issue, and such themes have included comedy, sexuality in cinema, the films of Martin Scorsese, Canadian film, Imperialism, teen films, Vietnam, interpretation, documentary, rethinking authorship, and questions of value.

In issue No. 70, Wood announced that he was stepping down from the collective board, but would continue to contribute to the magazine. Issue No. 71 (Sexuality in the Cinema) was delayed for several months due to financial problems. However, it finally appeared on store-shelves in late May 2007. The final print issue of the magazine was Issue 98 (2016).

== See also ==
- List of film periodicals
