= Hogtown (film) =

- Directed by: Daniel Nearing
- Written by: Daniel Nearing
- Produced by: Daniel Nearing; Rachel Rozycki; Sanghoon Lee; Jason Knade; Herman Wilkins; Keisha Dyson
- Starring: Herman Wilkins; Diandra Lyle; Alexander Sharon; McKenzie Chinn; Marco Garcia; Dianne Bischoff
- Cinematography: Sanghoon Lee; Daniel Nearing
- Edited by: Philip Larkin
- Music by: Paul Bhasin; Raymond Dunlap
- Production company: 9:23 Films
- Distributed by: 9:23 Films
- Release date: 2015
- Running time: 95 minutes
- Country: United States
- Language: English

Hogtown is a multi-racial, multilingual "period-less" 2015 independent film. Set against the backdrop of the 1919 Chicago race riots, the story revolves around the mysterious disappearance of a millionaire theater owner during a snowstorm. Bill Stamets of the Chicago Sun-Times acknowledged Hogtown as "the most original film made in Chicago about Chicago to date". It was named one of the 10 Best Films of 2016 by Ben Kenigsberg, who reviewed the film for The New York Times, and JR Jones of The Chicago Reader named it the best film about Chicago and the best film made in Chicago, "period," for 2015. The film won Best Picture awards at the 30th Black International Cinema Berlin, the 2015 International Black Film Festival (Nashville), the 2015 Los Angeles Black Film Festival, and the 2015 Independent Film Playoff (Los Angeles). It is the second of three films in an unnamed trilogy, following the 2010 film Chicago Heights and preceding Sister Carrie (2023).

== Factual basis ==
The era in which the story is set was when the infamous Chicago Race Riots of 1919 had the city in the throes of racial tension, and includes characters based on individuals involved in that crisis, including its first victim, Eugene Williams, and the first injured policeman, Dan Callahan.

Ambrose Greenaway, the theatre owner of the film, is modeled on Ambrose Small, who disappeared during a snowstorm in Toronto on December 2, 1919. The prime suspects in his disappearance are similarly modeled on real people - Theresa Greenaway on Theresa Small, and John Doughty, based on Small's accountant of the same name.

Ernest Hemingway, who lived in Toronto and in Oak Park (a suburb of Chicago) in this period, is also a character, as is the American author Sherwood Anderson, who was living and working in Chicago at that time.

In 1919 Chicago also faced the Black Sox Scandal, one of Major League Baseball's first, and biggest, cheating scandals.

== Cast ==
- Herman Wilkins as DeAndre Son Carter/Marquis Coleman
- Diandra Lyle as Nia Coleman
- Dianne Bischoff as Theresa Greenaway
- McKenzie Chinn as Aaliyah
- Alexander Sharon as Ernest Hemingway
- Nahum Zarco as Kakisamanetowayo
- Pete Giovagnoli as Dan Callahan
- Joe Mack as John Doughty
- Marco Garcia as Sherwood Anderson
- Gene Mui as Chiu Yuen Wong
- Sean Walton as James Cowan
- Jay Disney as Ambrose Greenaway
- Jose Ma Mendiola as Aparicio Reyes
- Etta Oben as Chicago Defender Reporter
- Patrick Cunningham as Jack Dempsey
- Teresa Cesario as Gloria Swanson
- Walt Sloan as William Hale Thompson
- Darren Stephens as News on the March Narrator
- Jules Reid as Asylum Worker
- Steve Pavlik as Charlie Churchill
- Alex Kazhinsky as Coroner
- Kaelen Strouse as Doughty’s Cellmate
- Michael Wexler as Thomas Flynn
- Brandon Byrd as Eugene Williams
- Keisha Dyson as Madam
- Mary Mikva as Emma Goldman
- San Raysby as Sing Wing Racist
- Elizabeth Austin as Fortune Teller
- Emmanuel Isaac as Young Kakisamanetowayo
- Remoh Romeo as Young Marquis / Barber
- Marcelina Knade as Bookstore Patron
- Benny Stewart as Aaliyah’s Father / Devil-Horned Man II
- James Barbee as Evil Barber
- Rich Gratt / alleyway policeman & prisoner VI

== Production ==
Hogtown was filmed on location in Chicago and nearby cities; Crown Point, Indiana; Niagara Falls, Ontario, Canada; and Paris, France. A portion of the film’s micro-budget was courtesy of an Individual Artists Program Grant from the City of Chicago Department of Cultural Affairs & Special Events and the Illinois Arts Council.

== Music ==
Hogtown's orchestra score is performed by the College of William and Mary Wind Ensemble and conducted by Paul Bhasin, who composed the score. The film also contains original gospel songs with music by Minister Raymond Dunlap and lyrics by Nearing.

== Reviews ==
The Chicago Sun-Times wrote that Hogtown is "the most original film made in Chicago about Chicago to date".

Ben Kenigsberg of The New York Times included Hogtown in the 10th position on his list of the 10 Best Films of 2016, saying “Daniel Nearing has carved out an original and boldly unfashionable niche. Hogtown plays like a find from a forgotten archive.”

The Chicago Reader named it the best film about Chicago and the best film made in Chicago, "period," for 2015.

The Chicago Tribune commented that although "Some of the poetic conceits are a bit much; I'm not sure having actors grind through lengthy descriptive verbal passages while simulating lovemaking is really a viable idea," Hogtown "captures nooks and crannies and the underside of the elevated train tracks with a true artist's eye. There's a brief montage of gorgeously photogenic fire escapes, seen in all weather, scored beautifully by composer Paul Bhasin, that's better than the entirety of the last few features I've seen, period."

== Awards and recognition ==
- 10 Best Films of 2016 - Ben Kenigsberg, The New York Times
- Best Feature Film - 2015 Black International Film Festival
- Best Film in a Fine Arts Discipline - 30th Black International Cinema Berlin
- Best Film Made in Chicago, 2015 - The Chicago Reader
- Best Picture - 2015 Los Angeles Black Film Festival
- Best Picture - 2015 Independent Film Playoff - Los Angeles Big House Alliance at LA Live
- In Competition - 2015 International Festival of World Cinema Milan
- 2015 Charlotte Black Film Festival
- 2015 Critical Edge Film Festival
- 2015 St. Louis Black Film Festival
