= Daniel Nearing =

American filmmaker

Daniel R. Nearing
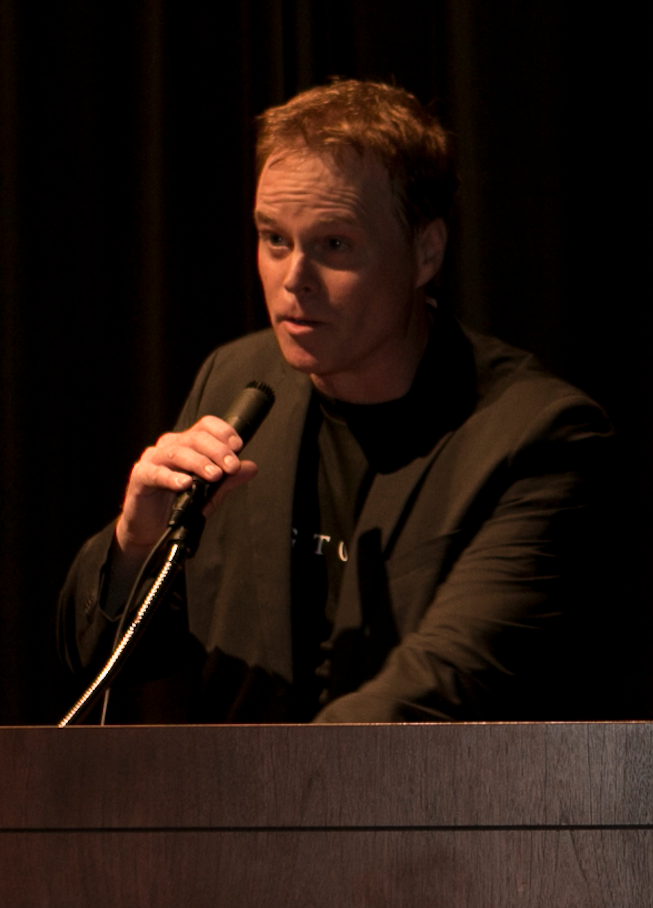
- Daniel Nearing
- Born: Medicine Hat, Alberta, Canada
- Citizenship: American
- Education: University of Toronto
- Notable work: Hogtown Chicago Heights
- Awards: 2015 Fellow, John Simon Guggenheim Foundation 2016 Fellow, The MacDowell Colony 2016-17 Filmmaker in Residence, City of Chicago 2016-17 Chicagoan of the Year for Film - the Chicago Tribune

Daniel Nearing (born December 21, 1961) is a Chicago, Illinois-based director, screenwriter, and independent filmmaker. Hogtown, his "period-less" American film, has been called "the most original film made in Chicago about Chicago to date" and named one of the 10 Best Films of 2016 by Ben Kenigsberg, who reviewed the film for The New York Times. Nearing was named the inaugural Filmmaker in Residence for the City of Chicago (Chicago Film Office, Department of Cultural Affairs and Special Events) and Chicagoan of the Year for Film (2016–17) by the Chicago Tribune

His earlier breakthrough film, the micro-budget production Chicago Heights (2010) garnered rave reviews, especially among fans of the original source material, Sherwood Anderson's influential collection of short stories, Winesburg, Ohio, a book long thought impossible to be adapted as a film. Noted film critic Roger Ebert included Chicago Heights in his list of the Top Art Films of 2010.

Nearing's storytelling style tends to be more circular than linear. He views plot as a veneer that ties together the more important, character-centered aspects of any story. Nearing is known for building sequences of vignettes and using powerful imagery to focus on the isolation and humility of human life. He works primarily in black and white, with moments of what he refers to as "ecstatic color" and with heavily shadowed, "idiosyncratic" shot compositions. Michael Phillips of the Chicago Tribune says that "Nearing's chosen way of telling a story is poetic, elliptical and sometimes unhelpfully indirect, but if he chooses, this Canadian-born, Chicago-based filmmaker could very well become a significant and lasting talent." Ben Kenigsberg of The New York Times says Nearing "is not the most accessible filmmaker, but with his new feature and his previous one, he has carved out an original and boldly unfashionable niche."

== Life and career ==
Nearing studied for his MA in modern and contemporary literature at the University of Toronto, and went on to earn an MFA in film from Toronto's York University, and served as producer resident at the Canadian Film Centre. He has studied under Northrop Frye (Anatomy of Criticism) and Michael Ondaatje (The English Patient).

He began his film career as a documentary filmmaker, making narrative-driven documentaries for both Canadian and U.S. outlets such as the Canadian Broadcasting Corporation, Discovery Networks, The Sports Network and Bravo. His subjects have included juvenile homicide, the longest bridge in the world over ice-forming waters, Russians playing in the National Hockey League, and the stagecraft of some of the world's finest writers. He shifted his focus to dramatic projects and founded 9:23 Films in 2008, feeling that documentary filmmaking "does not allow such direct access to deeper truths."

After several attempts at a faithful adaptation of Sherwood Anderson's Winesburg, Ohio, with collaborator Rudy Thauberger, the script and its production finally clicked when Nearing decided to set the rural period piece in a contemporary city. Chicago Heights was shot for just $1,000 in 2009. Chicago Heights premiered in competition at the Busan International Film Festival and was named Best Film in a Fine Arts Discipline at the Berlin Black Film Festival.

In 2011 Nearing adapted Rudy Thauberger's Goalie, a widely anthologized Canadian short story about hockey and obsession. The film had its world premiere at the Vancouver International Film Festival in Fall 2011.

Nearing followed those projects up with Hogtown, a "velvety" avant-garde murder mystery set against the backdrop of the 1919 Chicago race riots. This film reveals the collective influence the works Sherwood Anderson, EL Doctorow and Michael Ondaatje have had on Nearing's work. Hogtown was filmed on location in Illinois, Indiana, Ontario and Paris. The film stars Herman Wilkins, Diandra Lyle, and McKenzie Chinn. Bill Stamets of The Chicago Sun-Times called it "the most original film made in Chicago about Chicago to date" and Ben Kenigsberg of The Village Voice named it to his list of the 10 Best Films of 2016.

Nearing's Sister Carrie, a free-form adaptation of Theodore Dreiser's novel of the same name, premiered with a live orchestral score at Chicago's Gene Siskel Film Center in December 2022. Michael Phillips of The Chicago Tribune described it as "a cinematic riff that goes its own way in search of everything Carrie wanted: truth, beauty, love and its own way of telling a story." Juan-Carlos Ampie of The Indie refers to Sister Carrie as "the kind of unapologetically challenging film that contemporary Art House cinemas have abandoned in favor of more commercial works." "Nearing takes the fallen woman prototype of the romantic novels of yore and conjures around it a phantasmagoric cinematic exercise, combining the past with the present, art and artifice, and a wealth of timeless cultural references... Eve Rydberg is heartbreaking as the tragic heroine, and International ballet star Fabrice Calmels is a romantic hero for the ages. His presence allows for dreamy dancing sequences that merge seamlessly with the social realism of the surface."

== Filmography ==
=== Feature films ===
- Sister Carrie (Writer-Director-Producer, 2023)
- Hogtown (Writer-Director-Producer, 2016)
- Chicago Heights (Director, co-writer - 2010; reissued as The Last Soul on a Summer Night in 2012)

=== Documentaries ===
- Literary Olympics (Writer-Director-Producer, Bravo, 1999)
- Bomb Tech (Writer - The Discovery Channel, 1998)
- Giant's Playground (Writer-Director, The Discovery Channel, 1997)
- Soviet Reunion: The Russian Red Wings (Writer-Director-Producer, TSN - The Sports Network, 1996)
- Frayne: Portrait of the Sportswriter Laureate (Writer-Director-Producer, Canadian Broadcasting Corporation, 1995)
- The Big Train (Writer-Director-Producer, TSN - The Sports Network, 1994)
- When Children Kill (Writer-Director-Producer, Canadian Broadcasting Corporation, 1992)

=== Short films ===
- Nobody Knows (Writer-Director, 2010)
- Goalie (Director, 2011)
- Patrimony (Writer-Director, Canadian Broadcasting Corporation, 1993)
