= Save Me the Waltz =

1932 novel by Zelda Fitzgerald

- The cover of the first edition
- Author: Zelda Fitzgerald
- Cover artist: Cleonike Damianakes
- Language: English
- Genre: Tragedy
- Published: October 7, 1932
- Publisher: Charles Scribner's Sons
- Publication place: United States
- Media type: Print (hardcover and paperback)
- Pages: 272 (first edition)

Save Me the Waltz is a 1932 novel by American writer Zelda Fitzgerald. The novel's plot follows the privileged life of Alabama Beggs, a Southern belle who grows up in the Deep South during the Jim Crow era and marries David Knight, an aspiring painter. After engaging in a carefree life of hedonistic excess during the riotous Jazz Age, an aging Alabama aspires to be a prima ballerina, but an infected blister from her pointe shoe leads to blood poisoning and ends her dream of fame. Much of the semi-autobiographical plot reflects Zelda Fitzgerald's own life and her marriage to writer F. Scott Fitzgerald.

Following the decline of her mental health in Europe, Zelda wrote the novel in January–February 1932 while at home in Montgomery, Alabama, and then as a voluntary patient at Johns Hopkins Hospital's Phipps Clinic in Baltimore. She sent the manuscript to Maxwell Perkins, an editor at Scribner's. Unimpressed by her manuscript, Perkins published the novel at the urging of her husband in order for the couple to repay financial debts incurred by Zelda's voluntary stays at luxury clinics.

Although Scott Fitzgerald praised the novel's quality, literary critics panned the novel for its lush prose and weak characterization. The book sold approximately 1,300 copies, and Zelda earned a grand total of $120.73. Its critical and commercial failure dispirited Zelda and led her to pursue other interests as a playwright and a painter. After investors declined to produce her play, her husband arranged an exhibition of her paintings, but the critical response proved equally disappointing.

In 1959, a decade after her death, Zelda's friend and literary critic Edmund Wilson wrote in The New Yorker magazine that readers should not infer too much about the Fitzgeralds' marriage based on Save Me the Waltz as the semi-fictional novel merely presents the glamorous fantasy that Zelda and Scott created about their lives. Wilson stated that acquaintance Morley Callaghan's 1963 memoir That Summer in Paris provides a more accurate depiction of the Fitzgeralds' marriage while in Europe.

In 1970, Nancy Milford's biography Zelda fostered a number of myths about the novel, including false speculation that Zelda's husband rewrote the work. Scholarly examinations of Zelda's drafts debunked Milford's speculation. Archival evidence shows that Scott Fitzgerald did not rewrite the novel, and the revised galleys show nearly all marks to be in Zelda's hand. Despite such scholarly refutations, myths persist that Scott rewrote Zelda's novel or tried to suppress its publication. Her husband, in fact, played a crucial role in securing the novel's publication by Scribner's.

== Plot summary ==
A shooting star, an ectoplasmic arrow, sped through the nebulous hypothesis like a wanton hummingbird. From Venus to Mars to Neptune it trailed the ghost of comprehension, illuminating far horizons over the pale battlefields of reality.

— Zelda Fitzgerald, Save Me the Waltz (1932)

Alabama Beggs, a pampered Southern belle "incubated in the mystic pungence of Negro mammies", comes of age in the Deep South during the Jim Crow era. (Note: Zelda's grandfather, Willis B. Machen, served in the Confederate Congress. Her father's uncle John Tyler Morgan, a Confederate general in the American Civil War, became the second Grand Dragon of Alabama's Ku Klux Klan. According to biographer Nancy Milford, Zelda Sayre came from "the heart" of the "Confederate establishment in the Deep South".) She marries David Knight, a 22-year-old Irish Catholic artist and a United States Army officer stationed near her town during World War I.

David becomes a famous painter, and the newlywed couple moves to New York. They enjoy constant revelries of hedonistic excess and dissipation amid the riotous Jazz Age. Alabama and David relocate to the French Riviera where a French aviator, Jacques Chevre-Feuille, romances Alabama. (Note: In France, while Scott labored on his novel The Great Gatsby, French aviator Edouard Jozan romanced Zelda, and she requested a divorce.) In retaliation, David abandons Alabama at a dinner party and spends the night with a dancer. (Note: At a dinner party, Zelda threw herself down a flight of marble stairs because Fitzgerald ignored her while talking to dancer Isadora Duncan.)

A dissatisfied and restless Alabama becomes estranged from her alcoholic husband and their young daughter, Bonnie. Obsessed with fame, an aging Alabama aspires to be a renowned prima ballerina and devotes herself to this ambition. She receives a once-in-a-lifetime opportunity to dance a featured part with the prestigious San Carlo Opera Ballet Company in Naples. Alabama journeys to the city alone, and she dances her solo debut in the opera Faust. A blister, infected by glue in her pointe shoe box, leads to blood poisoning, and Alabama can never dance again.

The unhappy couple returns to Alabama's beloved Deep South during the Great Depression to see her dying father. She searches for meaning in her father's death but finds none. (Note: There is scholarly speculation about whether her father Anthony D. Sayre sexually abused Zelda, but no evidence exists confirming incest.) Though outwardly successful to the general public, both Alabama and David remain miserable. In the final passages, the unhappy Knights sit motionless, a dissipated couple contemplating the aftermath of a wild party and the wreckage of their lives.

== Major characters ==
- Alabama Beggs – A Southern belle from Alabama based on Zelda Fitzgerald.
- David Knight – An aspiring young painter based on Zelda's husband F. Scott Fitzgerald.
- Jacques Chevre-Feuille – A French aviator who romances Alabama, based on Edouard Jozan.
- Bonnie – The daughter of Alabama and David based on Frances "Scottie" Fitzgerald.

== Background and composition ==
=== Neo-Confederate upbringing ===
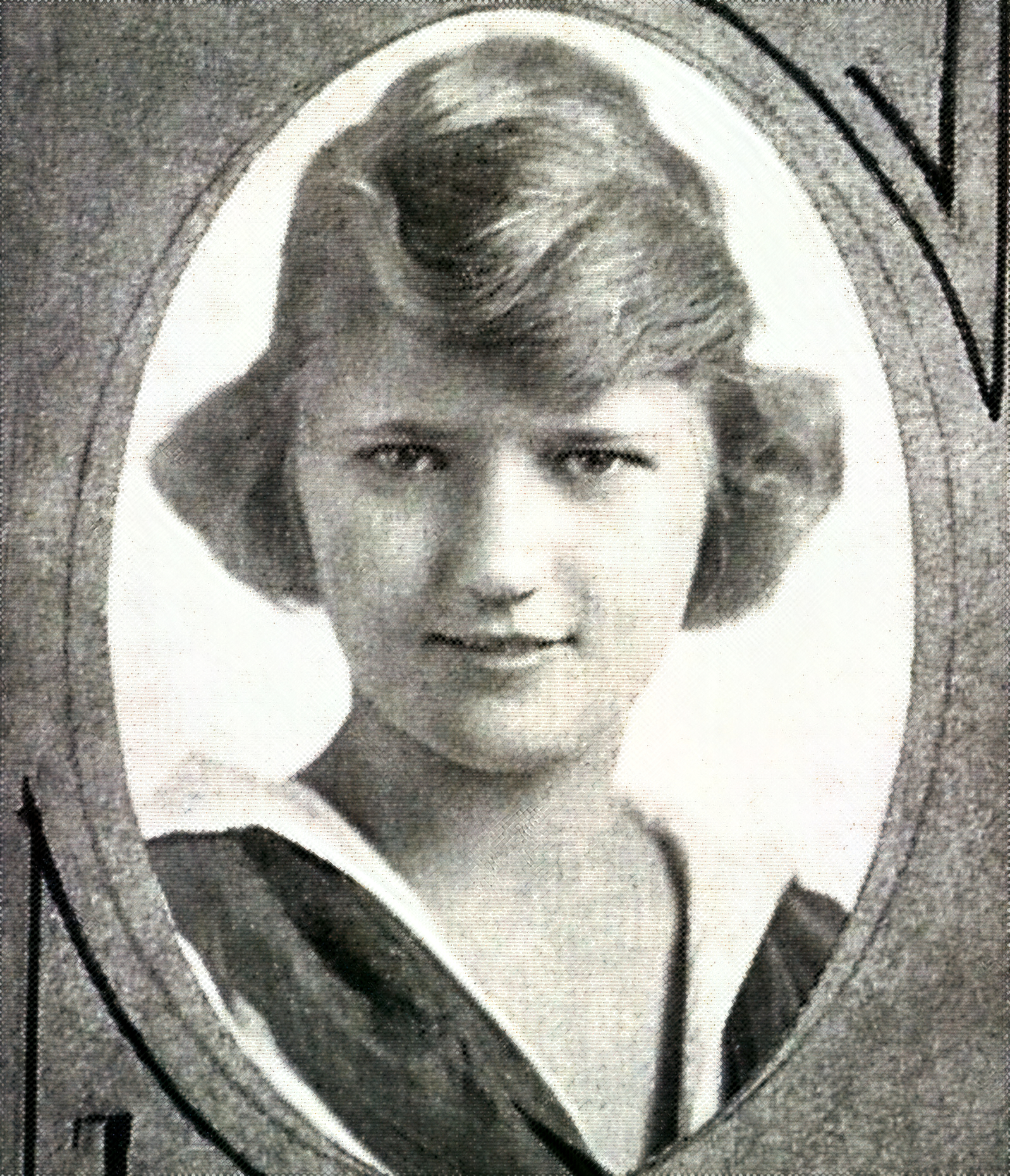
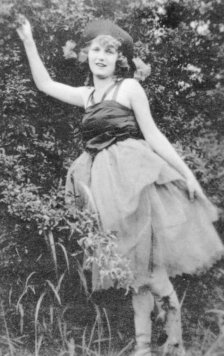
Fitzgerald in a 1918 photo from her yearbook at Sidney Lanier High School (left) and at 19 years old in a dance costume (right). A staunch neo-Confederate, Zelda described herself as "a Typhoid Mary of Confederate tradition".

Save Me the Waltz has been described by commentators as an "account of 'the way things were' among the Confederates in Montgomery." Zelda grew up in the heart of the Jim Crow South's white supremacist establishment and revered the Confederate States of America. Her father's uncle, U.S. Senator John Tyler Morgan, reigned as the Grand Dragon of Alabama's Ku Klux Klan. Her father, Anthony D. Sayre, an Alabama politician, authored the law that disenfranchised black voters and inaugurated the state's racially segregated Jim Crow era.

A staunch neo-Confederate, Zelda idolized her white supremacist father who, as a legislator and judge, embodied the "categorical imperatives of Confederate ethics" and served as "one of the sturdiest pillars" of Alabama's racial hierarchy. Embracing her family's white supremacist beliefs, Zelda described herself as "a Typhoid Mary of Confederate tradition" in Scott's "decadent world".

Zelda's youth in Jim Crow Alabama exemplified Southern "white girlhood." She grew up immersed in "the white romanticism of antebellum plantation life built on slavery", and she lived a privileged existence free of any responsibilities with her every whim gratified by African American servants. Accustomed to black servants catering to her every need, an adult Zelda showed little competence in managing ordinary responsibilities. Growing up amid segregation and frequent lynchings of African Americans, Zelda never questioned her milieu’s brutality and injustice.

In July 1918, Zelda Sayre met aspiring novelist F. Scott Fitzgerald at the whites-only Montgomery Country Club. During their courtship, Zelda and Scott strolled through Oakwood Cemetery, where Zelda chided Scott for failing to show sufficient reverence to the Confederate dead. The two became engaged but, when Zelda became convinced that he could not support her affluent lifestyle, she broke off the engagement during the Red Summer of 1919. After Scribner's published Scott's first novel, Zelda agreed to marry him. In April 1920, they married in a small ceremony at St. Patrick's Cathedral. Her love for the Jim Crow South caused friction in her marriage as her husband disdained the region and the Confederacy. Over time, Zelda's political views evolved from neo-Confederate beliefs toward an espousal of fascism as a political creed.

=== Mental deterioration ===
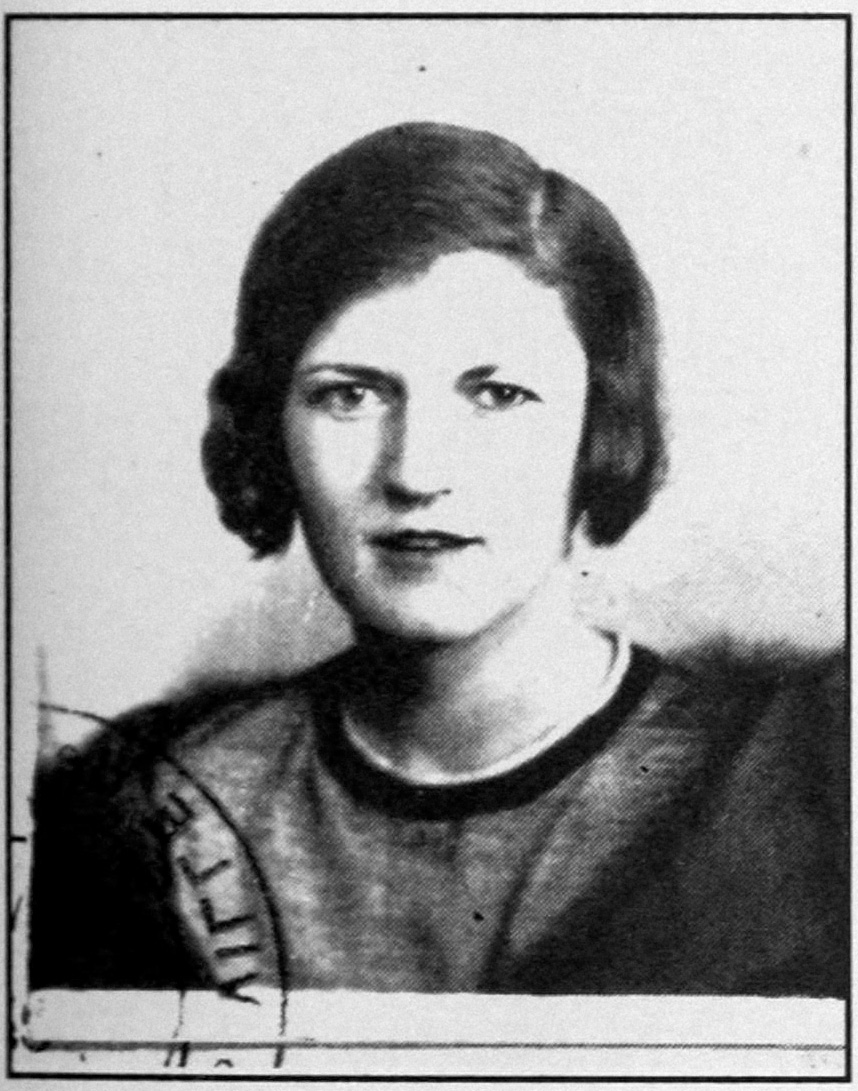
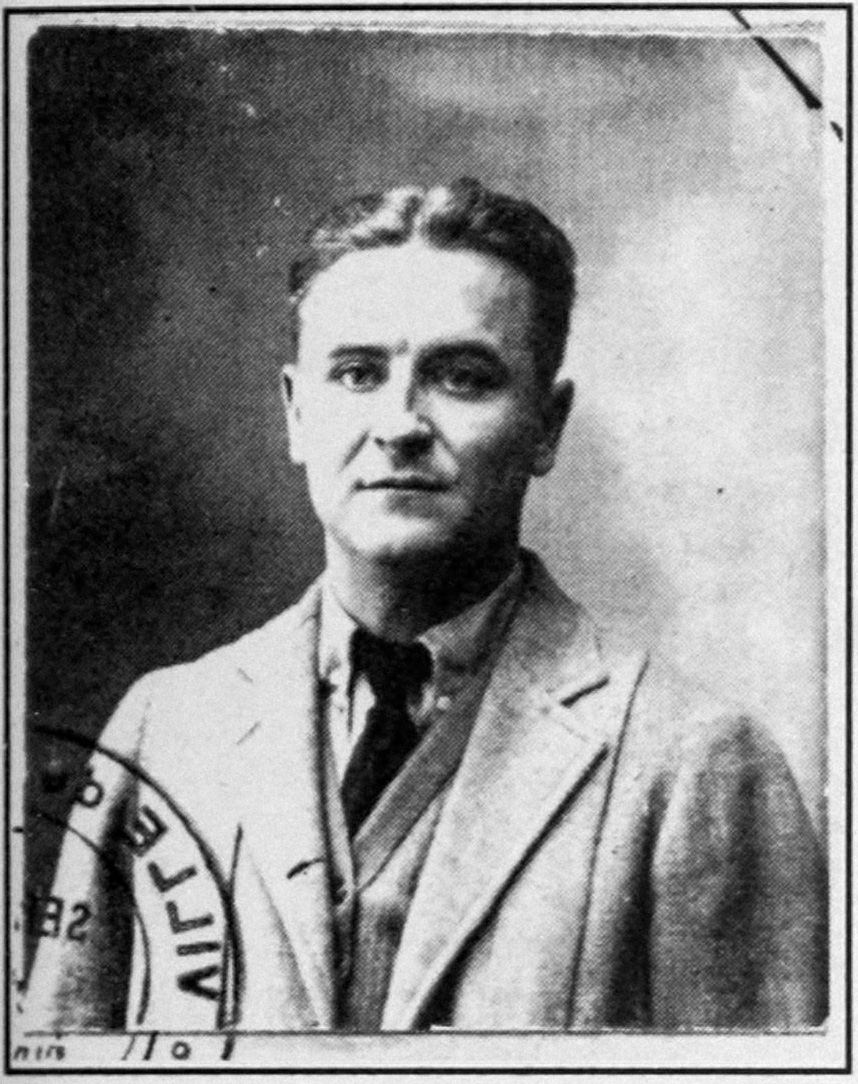
French identity cards for Zelda and Scott Fitzgerald circa 1929, the year in which Zelda's mental health deteriorated, and she experienced homicidal and suicidal tendencies necessitating psychiatric care.

In the winter of 1929, while a 29-year-old Zelda Fitzgerald and her 33-year-old husband Scott sojourned in France, Zelda's mental health deteriorated. Sara Mayfield, one of Zelda's confidants, stated that Zelda underwent three abortions in the preceding years, and Zelda's sister Rosalind speculated the effects of these procedures exacerbated her mental deterioration. During this period, Zelda became obsessed with dreams of fame as a prima ballerina. According to her daughter Scottie, Scott Fitzgerald supported Zelda's ambitions and paid for her ballet lessons.

In September 1929, after receiving an invitation to dance with the San Carlo Opera Ballet Company in Naples, Zelda undertook a grueling daily practice of up to eight hours a day. This intense regimen destroyed her physical health and precipitated a nervous breakdown. One evening, her husband returned home to find an exhausted Zelda, unable to speak, collapsed on the floor and entranced with a pile of dust. After summoning a French physician, the doctor examined an incommunicable Zelda and posited that she suffered a collapse of her mental health.

I always feel shocked and apologetic when I find myself momentarily in a calm mood... its so rare to find the appropriate emotion going toward the appropriate object... I'm rather angry because people won't let me be insane.

— Zelda Fitzgerald, private correspondence during her first hospitalization in 1930

A month later, in October 1929, during an automobile trip to Paris along the mountainous roads of the Grande Corniche, Zelda seized the car's steering wheel and tried to kill herself, her husband, and their 9-year-old daughter Scottie by driving over a cliff. After this homicidal and suicidal incident, doctors diagnosed Zelda with schizophrenia and psychopathic tendencies. Dr. Oscar Forel wrote in his psychiatric diagnosis: "The more I saw Zelda, the more I thought at the time [that] she is neither [suffering from] a pure neurosis nor a real psychosis—I considered her a constitutional, emotionally unbalanced psychopath—she may improve, [but] never completely recover." At the nadir of her mental health struggles, she engaged in coprophagia, the compulsive consumption of feces.

=== Writing and production ===
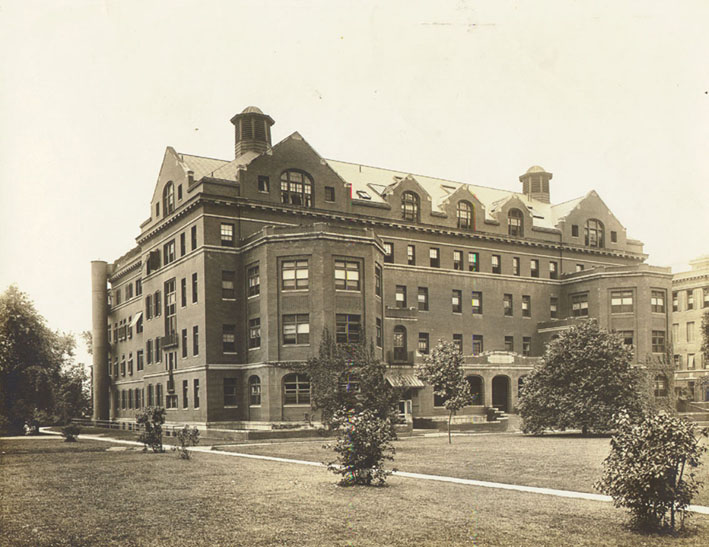
The Phipps Clinic in Baltimore. Zelda wrote the novel while staying as a voluntary patient at this institution, one of the most expensive facilities in the United States.

After the initial observations of psychopathic tendencies, Zelda received further care at expensive psychiatric institutions. Following the Fitzgeralds' return from Europe and after another severe mental health episode, Zelda insisted—over her husband's financial objections—that she be admitted as a voluntary patient to the exclusive Phipps Clinic at Johns Hopkins Hospital in Baltimore. The Phipps Clinic granted admission to Zelda on February 12, 1932. Dr. Adolf Meyer, a schizophrenia expert, oversaw her care and psychiatric evaluations. As part of her recovery routine, she spent several hours leisurely writing each day.

Having begun writing a novel in January 1932 while at home in Montgomery, Alabama, Zelda finished the work in February during her voluntary stay at the luxurious Phipps Clinic. She wrote to Scott: "I am proud of my [unfinished] novel, but I can hardly restrain myself enough to get it written. You will like it—It is distinctly École Fitzgerald, though more ecstatic than yours—perhaps too much so." In a rush of enthusiasm, Zelda hastily finished the novel on March 9, 1932, and she sent the unaltered manuscript to editor Maxwell Perkins at Scribner's.

Surprised to receive a novel in the mail from Zelda without prior notice, Perkins perused her original and unaltered manuscript. Perkins discerned "a slightly deranged quality" in the prose that gave the impression that Zelda could not separate "fiction from reality." Despite his long experience as an editor, Perkins found many of Zelda's sentences to be awkward in their construction, as she chose words for their sound rather than their meaning and favored numerous garish metaphors that drew attention to themselves instead of making effective comparisons. Underwhelmed by the work, Perkins deemed the manuscript's overall tone to be hopelessly "dated" and evocative of the bygone Jazz Age hedonism in Scott Fitzgerald's 1922 work, The Beautiful and Damned. Perkins hoped that her husband, Scott, as a thrice published novelist, might be able to improve the novel's overall quality with his guidance.

=== Minor revisions ===
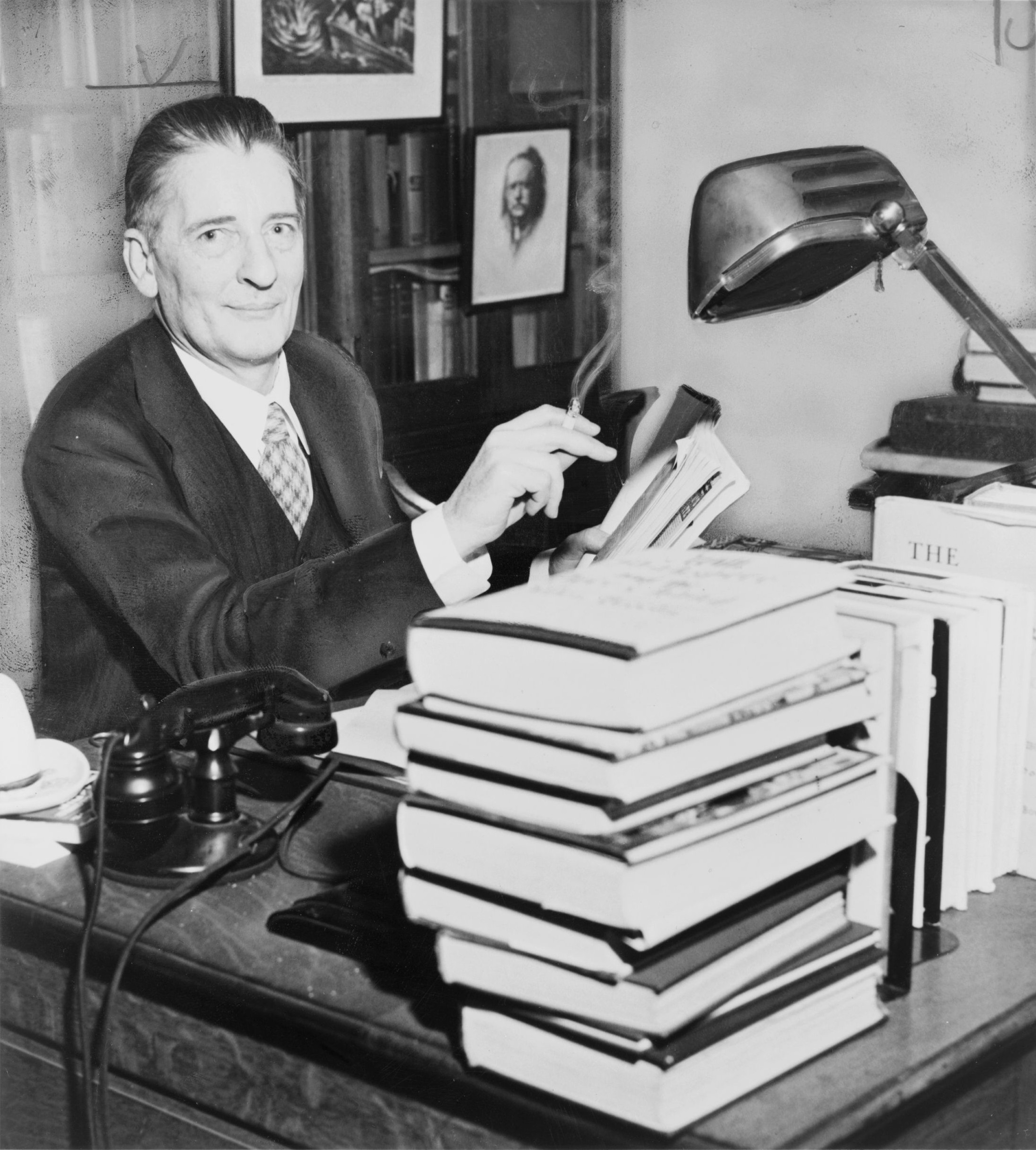
Upon receiving Zelda's original and unaltered manuscript, editor Maxwell Perkins deemed its tone to be "dated" and a relic of the bygone Jazz Age.

Learning that Zelda submitted a manuscript to his editor, Scott—consumed with writing his forthcoming work, Tender Is the Night—became angry that she had not shown a draft to him beforehand. Perusing the manuscript, he objected to her plagiarism of his character Amory Blaine, the protagonist of This Side of Paradise, and her use of the very same autobiographical plot as his forthcoming novel.

After receiving Scott's letter outlining these objections, Zelda replied that "we might have touched the same material." Despite his initial angry reaction, a debt-ridden Scott soon concluded that Zelda's book might improve their financial situation, and the couple speedily resolved their disagreements.

Contrary to later speculation, Zelda did not significantly revise the novel in response to Scott's guidance, and the galleys show nearly all revisions to be in Zelda's hand. Scott neither partially rewrote nor extensively edited the manuscript. After minor edits, Scott effusively praised the novel. He wrote to Perkins in an attempt to persuade the editor of the novel's improved quality and saleability:

Here is Zelda's novel. It is a good novel now, perhaps a very good novel—I am too close to tell. It has the faults and virtues of a first novel. It is more the expression of a powerful personality, like Look Homeward Angel, than the work of a finished artist like Ernest Hemingway. It should interest the many thousands in dancing. It is about something and absolutely new, and should sell.

Perkins did not share Scott's enthusiasm for Zelda's novel. Although still unimpressed by her revised manuscript, Perkins—suffering from intense depression—consented to publish the work regardless as a way for the couple to repay their financial debt to Scribner's. At the time, much of this financial debt resulted from Zelda's bills for her voluntary stays at the Phipps Clinic and other expensive institutions. Perkins arranged for half of the couple's book royalties to be applied against their debt to Scribner's until they repaid at least $5,000 (equivalent to $117,988 in 2025).

On June 14, 1932, Zelda signed a contract with Charles Scribner's Sons to publish the book, and Scribner's published the work on October 7 with a printing of 3,010 copies—typical for a first novel amid the Great Depression—on cheap paper, with a green linen cover. According to Zelda, the novel's title derived from a Victor record catalog, evoking the glamorous lifestyle that the couple enjoyed during the riotous Jazz Age.

== Contemporary reception ==
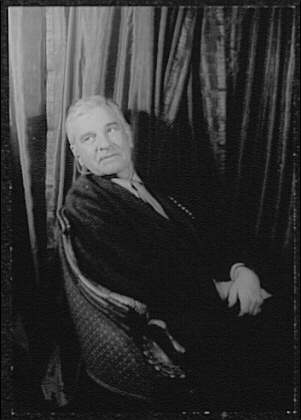
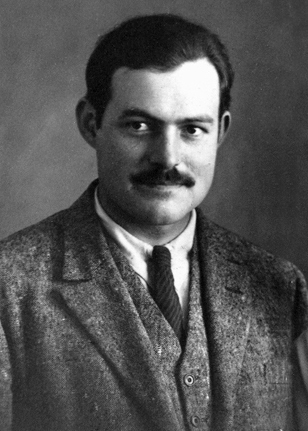
Amid the critical backlash, Malcolm Cowley wrote a letter of consolation to the Fitzgeralds, while Ernest Hemingway criticized the novel's quality.

Following its publication on October 7, 1932, Save Me the Waltz received overwhelmingly negative reviews from literary critics. The critics savaged Zelda's prose as overwritten, attacked her characterization as weak, and declared her tragic scenes to be unintentionally comedic. Although some praised her writing as "always vibrant and always sensitive", other critics faulted the "exaggerated" and "atrocious" prose as "words gone wild" to the point of unintelligibility.

There is a constant recurrence of exaggerated images such as: 'Sylvia flopped across the room like an opaque protoplasm propelling itself across a sand bank.' We may attribute this, and other disturbing elements, to the fact that this is Mrs. Fitzgerald’s first attempt to master the novel form.

— New York Herald Tribune Books, 1932

Geoffrey T. Hellman wrote in The Saturday Review of Literature that "her book rivals the cross-word puzzle page in point of obscurity" and lamented "the author's general inability to create full-bodied figures." Similarly, a Forum and Century reviewer wrote that, although "gifted with a talent for crisp dialogue and with a pleasant sense of the humorous, Mrs. Fitzgerald has some reason seen fit to subordinate this element in her first novel to an extremely involved prose style which fails to do anything but clog both the action of the plot and the reader's understanding of the characters."

A recurrent criticism focused on the novel's lack of proper editing prior to its publication. Dorothea Brande in The Bookman lambasted not only Zelda but her editor Max Perkins: "It is not only that her publishers have not seen fit to curb an almost ludicrous lushness of writing but they have not given the book the elementary services of a literate proofreader.... Mrs. Fitzgerald should have had what help she needed to save her book from the danger of becoming a laughing-stock." Herschel Brickell of The New York Times echoed this complaint: "It is a pity... that the publishers could not have had more accurate proofreading... This may sound like a small thing, but to meet such mistakes on practically every page is so annoying that it becomes almost impossible to read the book at all."

The scathing reviews puzzled Zelda, although she acknowledged to Max Perkins that a review by William McFee, writing in The New York Sun, contained several accurate criticisms. McFee wrote:

In this book, with all its crudity of conception, its ruthless purloinings [sic] of technical tricks and its pathetic striving after philosophic profundity, there is the promise of a new and vigorous personality in fiction.

Malcolm Cowley, a friend of the Fitzgeralds, read Zelda's book and wrote consolingly to her husband Scott, "It moves me a lot: she has something there that nobody got into words before." Another friend, Ernest Hemingway, found little merit in the work and warned editor Max Perkins that, if he ever published a novel by one of Hemingway's wives as a money-making scheme, "I'll bloody well shoot you." Perkins remained privately dismissive of the novel's quality. The book sold approximately 1,300 copies, and Zelda earned a final sum of $120.73 (equivalent to $2,849 in 2025).

== Post-publication ==
The [novel's poor sales] won't be encouraging to you, and I have not liked to ask whether you were writing any more because of the fact, but I do think the last part of that book, in particular, was very fine; and if we [both Perkins and Zelda] had not been in the depths of depression, the result would have been quite different.

— Max Perkins, 1932 letter to Zelda

The critical and commercial failure of Save Me the Waltz dispirited Zelda. Following a book review suggesting that "her medium... would seem to be not fiction but the theater", Zelda believed that she might have more success as a playwright, and she wrote a farcical stage play titled Scandalabra in the fall of 1932. She submitted the play manuscript to agent Harold Ober, but Broadway investors declined to produce the play. To bolster her spirits, Scott arranged for her play Scandalabra to be staged by a Little Theater group in Baltimore, Maryland, and he sat through long hours of rehearsals of the play. This independent production arranged by Scott Fitzgerald proved to be a failure.

Following the consecutive failures of her novel Save Me the Waltz and her play Scandalabra, Scott Fitzgerald remarked during a mutual criticism session with his wife and a psychiatrist that Zelda, as "a third-rate writer and a third-rate ballet dancer", should instead pursue other creative outlets. Zelda next attempted to paint watercolors, but when her husband arranged their exhibition in 1934, the critical response proved equally disappointing. As with the negative reception of her book, New York critics disliked her paintings. The April 14, 1934, issue of The New Yorker described them as "paintings by the almost mythical Zelda Fitzgerald; with whatever emotional overtones or associations may remain from the so-called Jazz Age."

In January 1959, over a decade after Zelda's death, her friend and literary critic Edmund Wilson wrote in The New Yorker magazine that readers should not infer too much about the Fitzgeralds' marriage based on Save Me the Waltz as the semi-fictional novel merely presents the glamorous fantasy that Zelda and Scott created about their lives. Wilson stated that Morley Callaghan's 1963 memoir That Summer in Paris, recounting Callaghan's friendship with the Fitzgeralds during their sojourn abroad, provides a more accurate representation of the couple's lives while in Europe.

In later decades, critics sought to reevaluate Save Me the Waltz in light of supposed time constraints on its composition prior to publication, although no such time constraints existed according to biographies. In 1991, The New York Times literary critic Michiko Kakutani reviewed the work and opined "that for all its flaws it still manages to charm, amuse and move the reader is even more remarkable. Zelda Fitzgerald succeeded, in this novel, in conveying her own heroic desperation to succeed at something of her own, and she also managed to distinguish herself as a writer".

== Posthumous myths ==
The assumption that [Scott Fitzgerald] actually rewrote Save Me the Waltz is false. The available documents indicate that his work was advisory.... Almost all the marks are in Zelda Fitzgerald's hand. F. Scott Fitzgerald did not systematically work on the surviving proofs: only eight of the words written on them are clearly in his hand.

— Matthew J. Bruccoli, The Collected Writings of Zelda Fitzgerald, Introduction, 1991

In 1970, nearly a quarter of a century after Zelda's death and forty years after the publication of Save Me the Waltz, Nancy Milford's 1970 biography Zelda fostered a number of unfounded myths about the novel and its publication. Milford inaccurately speculated that F. Scott Fitzgerald extensively or partially rewrote Zelda Fitzgerald's manuscript prior to its publication by Scribner's. Contrary to Milford's speculation, scholarly examinations of Zelda's drafts of Save Me the Waltz deposited in the Fitzgerald Papers at Princeton University Library proved such claims to be patently false.

According to scholarly examinations, archival evidence indicates any input by Scott Fitzgerald to be advisory. The revised galleys show nearly all marks to be in Zelda's hand, and no evidence exists that Scott rewrote the work. Despite such scholarly debunking, myths persist that her husband rewrote Zelda's novel or attempted to suppress its publication. In fact, Scott expressed praise for the novel's quality and played a crucial role in ensuring its publication by Scribner's.
