= Anthony D. Sayre =

American politician (1858–1931)

Associate Justice of the Alabama Supreme Court
- In office 1909–1931

Member of the Alabama Senate from the 2nd district
- In office 1894–1897

Member of the Alabama House of Representatives from the 2nd district
- In office 1890–1893

Personal details
- Born: Anthony Dickinson Sayre; April 29, 1858 Tuskegee, Alabama, U.S.
- Died: November 17, 1931 (aged 73) Montgomery, Alabama, U.S.
- Party: Democratic
- Spouse: Minerva Buckner Machen (m. 1883)
- Children: 8, including Zelda Sayre
- Education: Roanoke College

Anthony Dickinson Sayre (April 29, 1858 – November 17, 1931) was an American lawyer and politician who served as a state legislator in the Alabama House of Representatives (1890–1893), as the President of the Alabama State Senate (1896–1897), and as an Associate Justice of the Supreme Court of Alabama (1909–1931). Influential in Alabama politics for nearly half a century, Sayre is widely regarded by historians as the legal architect who laid the foundation for the state's Jim Crow laws.

Sayre played a key role in undermining the protections guaranteed to black citizens in Alabama by the Fourteenth and Fifteenth Amendments to the United States Constitution and in enabling the ideology of white supremacy. As a white supremacist and state legislator in the post-Reconstruction era, he authored and introduced the landmark 1893 Sayre Act which disenfranchised black Alabamians for seventy years and ushered in the racially segregated Jim Crow period in the state. Sayre boasted in newspaper interviews that his law forever eliminated "the Negro from politics" in the Cotton State.

Sayre's uncle and patron was U.S. Senator John Tyler Morgan (D-Alabama), the second Grand Dragon of the Alabama Ku Klux Klan during Reconstruction and one of the most notorious racist ideologues of the Gilded Age. As a U.S. Senator, Morgan advocated for black disfranchisement, racial segregation, and lynching African-Americans. Sayre's daughter was socialite Zelda Sayre, the neo-Confederate wife of novelist F. Scott Fitzgerald. There is scholarly speculation regarding whether Anthony D. Sayre sexually abused Zelda as a young girl, but there is no evidence confirming incest.

Whereas F. Scott Fitzgerald disliked his Sayre in-laws and mocked their family's Confederate beliefs, Zelda embraced her family's beliefs and revered her father as a Southern paragon whose life embodied the "categorical imperatives of Confederate ethics". She later espoused fascism as a political ideology. In contrast to her mother Zelda, Anthony's granddaughter Frances "Scottie" Fitzgerald, felt guilt over the Sayre family's legacy of white supremacy. She undertook initiatives encouraging voter outreach to black Alabamians, but despite such efforts, they declined her social overtures.

== Biography ==
=== Early years and education ===
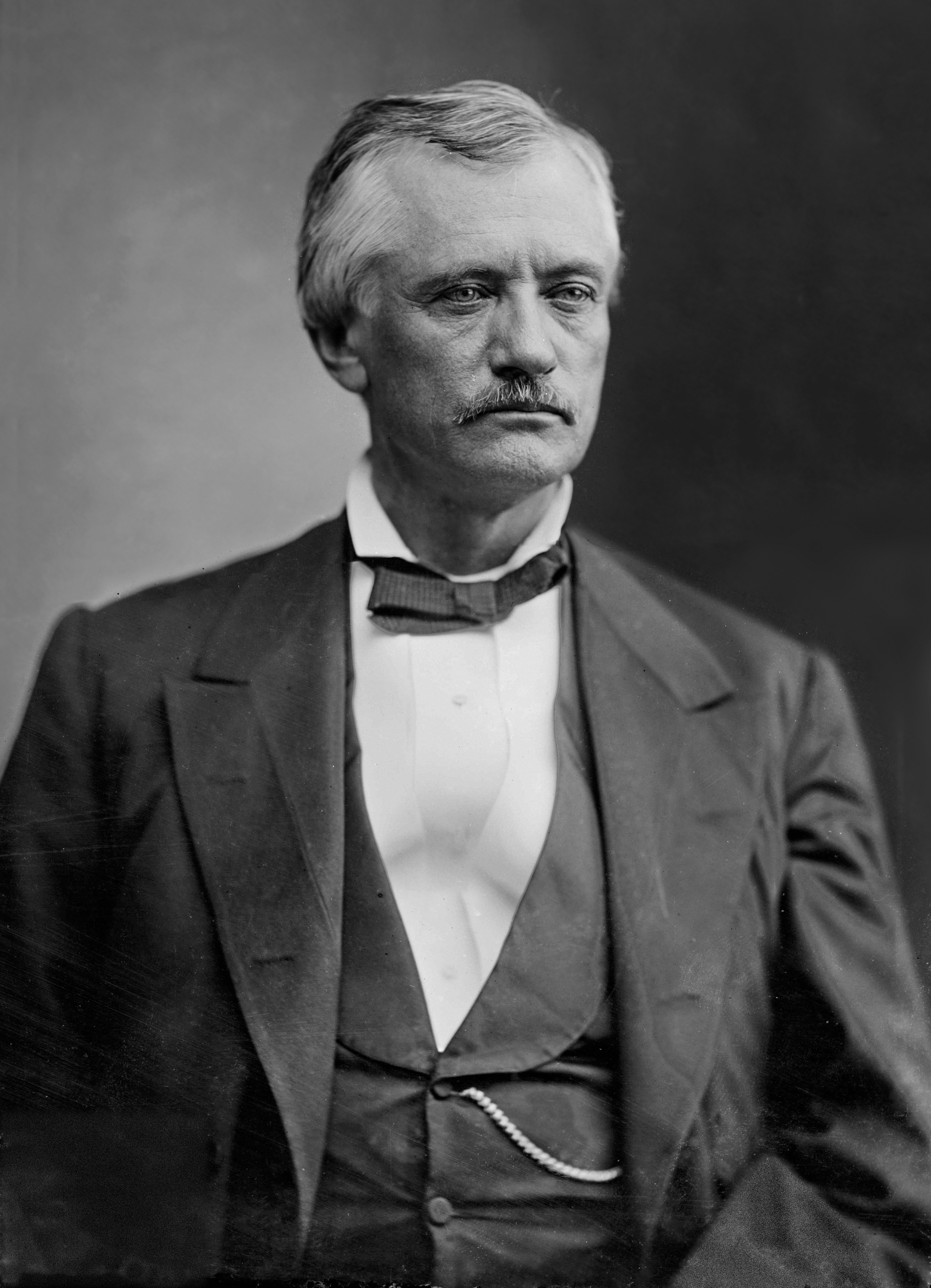
Sayre's uncle, U.S. Senator John T. Morgan, was the second Grand Dragon of the Alabama Ku Klux Klan and successfully overturned Reconstruction efforts in the wake of the Civil War.

Anthony D. Sayre was born in Tuskegee, Alabama, to affluent parents Daniel Sayre and Musidora Sayre (née Morgan). His family, particularly his maternal uncle, John Tyler Morgan, were prominent slave-holders and outspoken defenders of the transatlantic slave trade before the American Civil War. His father Daniel Sayre served as the influential editor of The Montgomery Post, an Alabama newspaper described by historians as a propaganda outlet for the Southern Confederacy. His uncle William Sayre owned a slave plantation.

The young Sayre was a model of Southern conservatism and "had all the proper family connections for a conservative politician." His father-in-law was Kentucky Senator Willis Benson Machen, a former Confederate general. His mother's uncle was the influential Alabama Senator John Tyler Morgan, another former Confederate general and the second Grand Dragon of the Alabama Ku Klux Klan. During Morgan's six consecutive terms as U.S. Senator from 1877 to 1907, he was an outspoken proponent of black disfranchisement, racial segregation, and lynching African-Americans. Sayre's paternal uncle William Sayre, using slavor labor, built the house later used by Jefferson Davis for the First White House of the Confederacy.

After two years of attending a wealthy private academy, Sayre pursued his higher education at Roanoke College, a private liberal arts college in Salem, Virginia. At the time, Roanoke remained famous throughout the American South for its students mustering a volunteer corps and fighting alongside Confederate forces amid the American Civil War. Upon graduation, Sayre returned to Alabama to study law under Judge Thomas M. Arrington (1829–1895), a former Lieutenant Colonel in the Confederate Army. In 1880 or 1881, Sayre was admitted to the Alabama bar, and he became known as "one of the most brilliant and able lawyers" in the state.

=== Political career ===
The Sayre secret ballot act had the same partisan and racist purposes as the constitutional convention.... Sayre claimed... that his bill "would restore the democratic party in Alabama. ... It eliminates the Negro from politics, and in a perfectly legal way."

— J. Morgan Kousser, The Shaping of Southern Politics (1974)

For the next thirty years, from 1880 to 1909, Sayre politically aligned himself with his uncle John Tyler Morgan's Bourbon Democrat faction of the Southern Democrats, and he represented both cities and counties in various capacities. Sayre served as clerk of the city court from 1883 to 1889, and next as Montgomery County's representative in the Alabama House of Representatives from 1890 to 1893.

According to Harvard political scientists Steven Levitsky and Daniel Ziblatt, Anthony Sayre—as an ambitious state legislator serving in the Alabama House of Representatives—played a pivotal role in the disfranchisement of the black population in the Cotton State and ushering in Alabama's Jim Crow era. Drawing on his legal expertise, Sayre drafted and introduced the landmark 1893 Sayre Act which he boasted was designed to "eliminate the Negro from politics, and in a perfectly legal way."

Sayre's legislation used "creative ways to reduce the influence of blacks" in Alabama politics and "made the voting process difficult for poor and illiterate blacks and whites through small changes to the election system." According to historian C. Vann Woodward, Sayre's discriminatory legislation "prohibited assistance in marking ballots, thus providing means of disfranchising thousands of illiterate voters, white as well as black." In the words of a contemporary party leader, Sayre's bill sought to "maintain white supremacy, and to have a ticket selected where only white men will vote."

=== Sayre Act Passage ===
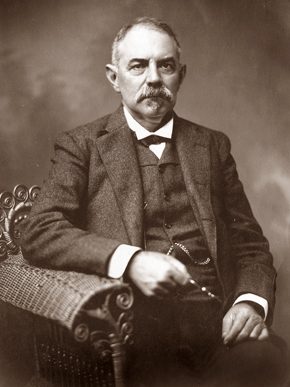
Alabama Governor Thomas G. Jones signed the 1893 Sayre Act to disenfranchise black voters.

Upon Sayre proposing his 1893 bill, the legislation met with fierce opposition by Populist and Republican legislators as the bill effectively disenfranchised 60,000 Alabamians and turned Alabama into a one-party state ruled by the Bourbon Democrats. Sayre and other Bourbon Democrats overcame the Populist and Republican opposition to his controversial legislation via procedural stratagems in the Alabama State Senate.

When the final legislation appeared on the desk of Alabama governor and former Confederate officer Thomas G. Jones, he eagerly signed Sayre's bill to disenfranchise black Alabamians, and Jones stated: "Let me sign that bill quickly, lest my hand or arm become paralyzed, because it forever wipes out... all the niggers."

According to historian J. Morgan Kousser, Sayre's racist bill resulted in a precipitous decrease in black Alabamians voting after 1892: "The fact that the estimated black voting percentage dropped by 22 points from 1892 to 1894, and remained below 50 percent thereafter, shows that the Sayre law was administered to disenfranchise Negros—especially those hostile to the Democratic party".

With the passage of the 1893 Sayre Act, the State of Alabama undermined the protections of the Fourteenth and Fifteenth Amendments to the United States Constitution guaranteeing black Alabamians the right to vote, disenfranchised black Alabamians for seventy years, and transformed Alabama into a one-party state.

After gaining notoriety due to the passage of his eponymous 1893 law that effectively ensured white supremacy and inaugurated the Jim Crow era in the state, the Alabama State Senate elected Sayre as a member in 1894, and he became its president in 1896 during his second term.

=== Judicial career and later years ===
[Judge Sayre] wanted to keep white supremacy and remove Negroes from politics... The judge and his supporters used poll taxes, literacy tests and other procedures to disenfranchise blacks. As a county judge, Sayre colluded in a prison lease system in which prisoners were essentially rented to do hard labor. They lived in filth and didn't get enough to eat, and some were too poor to pay fines so they had no freedom for long periods...

— Sam Lanahan, Scottie's son and Zelda's grandson, 2017

Sayre resigned from the Senate when he was elected in 1897 as a Montgomery city court judge. He was re-elected in 1903. In 1909, after Associate Justice James R. Dowdell became Chief Justice, Governor Braxton Bragg Comer appointed Sayre as an Associate Justice to the Alabama State Supreme Court, Serving for 22 years, he became regarded as a bedrock of Southern conservatism. He was re-elected as associate justice in 1910, elected in 1912 for a six-year term, and again in 1918, 1924, and 1930.

During his lengthy tenure as a judge, Sayre continued in his efforts to preserve white supremacy. He supported measures such as literacy tests, poll taxes, and other barriers designed to suppress black voting rights. He also participated in a convict leasing system that hired out prisoners for forced labor. Those prisoners suffered from inadequate food and prolonged confinement in unsanitary conditions, including cases where people remained imprisoned because they could not afford to pay fines.

After a long career on the bench, Sayre died after succumbing to influenza on November 17, 1931, at age 73. His death likely triggered Zelda's second mental health relapse in 1932. After her father's death, Zelda resided in and out of sanatoriums for the remainder of her life.

== Personal life ==
=== Marriage and family ===
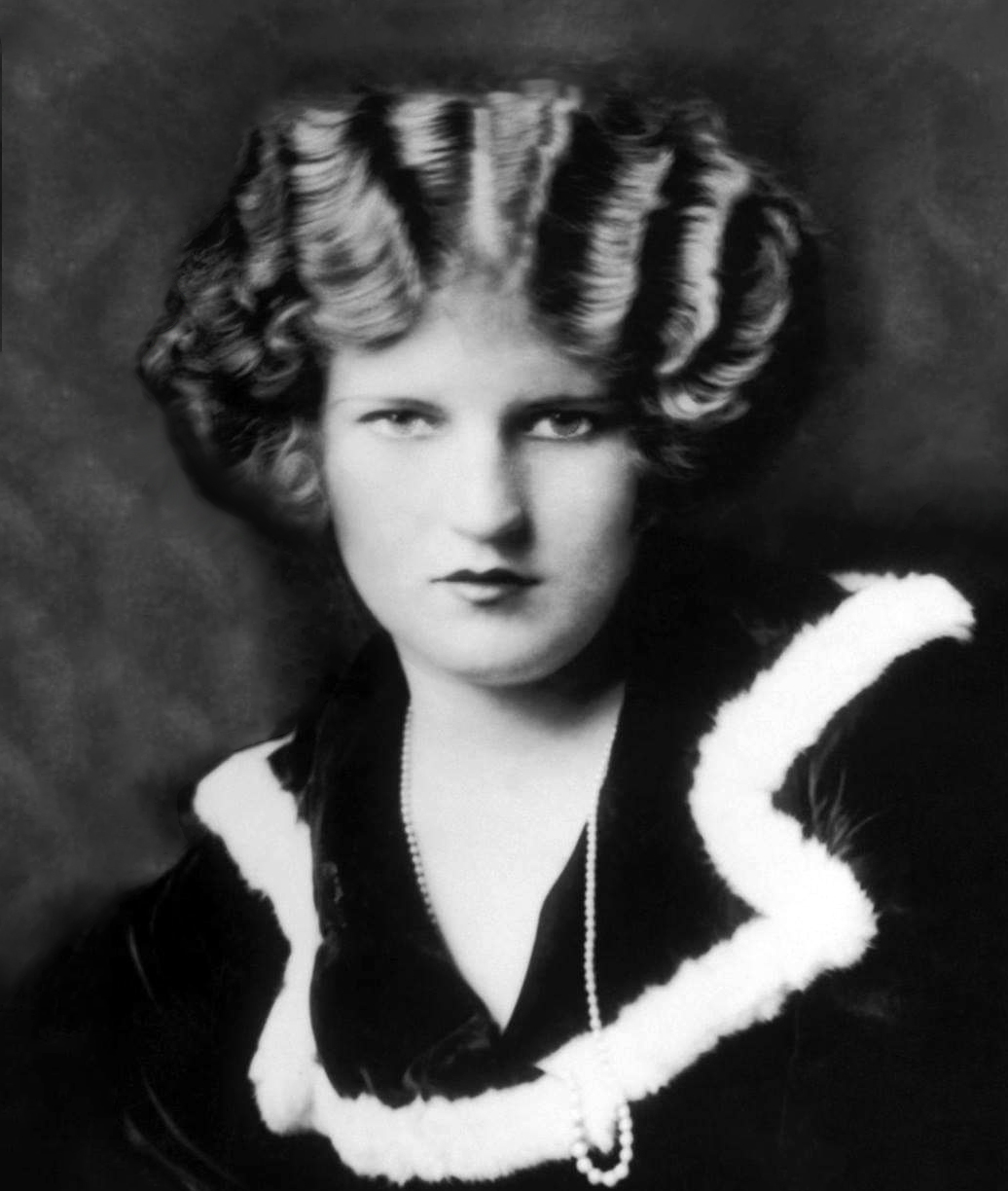
Sayre's daughter was Zelda Fitzgerald, the neo-Confederate wife of writer F. Scott Fitzgerald. Zelda revered her father and described herself as "a Typhoid Mary of Confederate tradition".

In the early 1890s [Zelda's father] Judge Anthony Sayre had introduced into the Alabama legislature the bill that had deprived the black people of Alabama, and thousands of poor whites, of the right to vote. The purpose of the Sayre Election Law... was to 'maintain white supremacy, and to have a ticket selected where only white men will vote.' '[Zelda's daughter] Scottie was really embarrassed by it'...

— Eleanor Lanahan, Scottie's daughter and Zelda's granddaughter, 1995

Circa 1883, a 25-year-old Sayre met Minerva "Minnie" Buckner Machen, the daughter of U.S. Senator Willis Benson Machen (D-Kentucky) and his third wife, Victoria Theresa Mims. The couple met while in Montgomery through Sayre's uncle and close friend Senator John Tyler Morgan. Morgan hosted a New Year's Eve ball in Montgomery and invited both Anthony and Minnie to attend. At the time, Minnie attended Miss Chilton's School for Girls, which stood on the site of the Sayre Street School. Sayre Street was named after Anthony's uncle, William Sayre, whose slaves built the home used by Jefferson Davis for the First White House of the Confederacy. Reflecting their Confederate backgrounds, both Anthony Sayre and Minnie Machen were white supremacists.

The Sayres married on January 17, 1883, in Eddyville, Kentucky, and settled in downtown Montgomery. They lived in the affluent white section of racially-segregated Montgomery in a lavish home with five bedrooms. During the Jim Crow era, which Sayre's 1893 law inaugurated, they relocated to the Wilson Plantation. They had eight children—three of whom died in infancy—including Anthony Dickinson Sayre Jr., who committed suicide in 1933 and Zelda Sayre, the wife of novelist F. Scott Fitzgerald. The Sayres employed many African-American domestic servants. Accustomed to these black servants catering to and fulfilling her every need, an adult Zelda showed little competence in managing ordinary responsibilities, from money matters to daily tasks.

=== Relationship with Zelda ===
Although Zelda's sibling Rosalind described their father as genial and humorous, neighborhood children feared him, and Zelda herself described him in her semi-autobiographical novel Save Me the Waltz as a remote and distant man—a "living fortress". Scholarly speculation exists regarding whether Sayre sexually abused Zelda as a young girl based on Fitzgerald's characterization in the semi-autobiographical work Tender is the Night, but there is no concrete evidence confirming incest. F. Scott Fitzgerald disliked his Sayre in-laws and believed the Sayre family suffered from hereditary mental illness.

Whereas Scott Fitzgerald denigrated his own family's Confederate relatives and mocked the Sayre family's Confederate beliefs, Zelda described herself as "a Typhoid Mary of Confederate tradition... in the frenetic, decadent world of Scott and his friends." She venerated her white supremacist father as a Southern paragon whose life embodied the "categorical imperatives of Confederate ethics". Over time, her political views evolved from neo-Confederate beliefs toward an espousal of fascism as a political creed. The increasing divergence in political opinion between Zelda and Scott regarding her love of the Confederacy and the Jim Crow South caused friction in their marriage. Zelda wrote to a friend: "Scott's changed... He used... to say he loved the South, but now he wants to get as far away from it as he can."

=== Family legacy ===
In contrast to her mother Zelda, Frances "Scottie" Fitzgerald felt guilt and embarrassment over the Sayre family's legacy of white supremacy. While living in Alabama, Scottie discovered that her grandfather authored the 1893 election law depriving the black people of Alabama of their voting rights and devoted herself to voter outreach for black citizens in Alabama. As many black citizens living in Montgomery still viewed the Sayre family with askance as late as the 1970s, they did not reciprocate her social overtures. In 2016, at a conference, F. Scott Fitzgerald's grandson, Sam Lanahan, spoke candidly on Anthony D. Sayre's legacy and described him as a white supremacist who used his judicial influence to "erode the emerging Negro power."
