= James Cullan Brown =

American golfer (2000–2020)

James Cullan Brown (January 16, 2000 – August 4, 2020) was an American amateur golfer who competed for the University of Kentucky men's golf team. A native of Eddyville, Kentucky, he was born to Rodney and Emily Brown and has a younger sister, Cathryn. Brown was recognized for his accomplishments in junior and collegiate golf, including winning the 2016 Kentucky high school individual state championship and earning Southeastern Conference (SEC) All-Freshman Team honors in 2019. He also competed in the 2019 Barbasol Championship on the PGA Tour, where he made the cut and finished tied for 53rd.

Brown died in August 2020 at the age of 20 following a battle with osteosarcoma, a rare form of bone cancer. His contributions to Kentucky golf have since been recognized through memorial events and the renaming of a golf course and a collegiate golf tournament in his honor.

== Early life and junior golf ==
Brown was born on January 16, 2000, and grew up in Eddyville, Kentucky. He attended Lyon County High School, where he became one of the state's accomplished junior golfers.

During his high school career, Brown won the Kentucky High School Athletic Association (KHSAA) individual state golf championship in 2016. He also finished as the state runner-up in 2015 and 2017 and was named Kentucky's Player of the Year in 2016.

Outside of high school competition, Brown participated in national and international junior golf tournaments. He was recognized as a Rolex Junior All-American and won the Kentucky Junior Masters three times. He also recorded nine top-10 finishes in American Junior Golf Association (AJGA) events, including a victory at the Bass Pro Shops/Payne Stewart Junior Championship.

Brown represented the United States in international junior competition and was a member of the American team that won the Evian Junior Cup in France.

== College career ==
Brown joined the University of Kentucky men's golf program in 2018, competing under head coach Brian Craig. After missing the fall portion of his freshman season because of an injury, he returned to competition during the spring of 2019.

During his freshman season, Brown recorded four top-20 finishes and earned a place on the SEC All-Freshman Team. One of his strongest collegiate performances came at the 2019 Mason Rudolph Championship, where he tied for fifth place. His opening-round score of 64 tied for the lowest 18-hole score recorded by a Kentucky player during Craig's tenure as head coach.

Brown also performed well at the 2019 SEC Championship, finishing tied for ninth during stroke play. His performance contributed to Kentucky's third-place finish and helped the team reach the semifinals of match play for the first time in program history.

His accomplishments during his freshman season earned him recognition as Kentucky Athletics' Male Rookie of the Year at the 2020 CATSPY Awards.

=== 2018–2019 ===
Academic All-SEC Team

All-Freshman Team

=== Spring 2019 ===
Played in 8 Events for a total of 24 Rounds

Scoring Average: 72.42

Low 18: 64 at the Mason Rudolph Championship

Recorded 2 Top-10 finishes

Recorded 4 Top-20 finishes

Best Finish: T-5 at the Mason Rudolph Championship with scores of 64-73-69 for a total of 206 (-7)

Top-10 at the SEC Championship with scores of 67-69-72 for a total of 208 (-2). Helping the team make the SEC Match Play with a T-3 Place finish as a team.

Won his first match 5&3 against B. Garrison from Tennessee in the Quarterfinals.

== 2019 Barbasol Championship ==
In July 2019, Brown received a sponsor exemption to compete in the Barbasol Championship, a PGA Tour event held at Keene Trace Golf Club in Nicholasville, Kentucky.

At 19 years old, Brown made the cut in his first PGA Tour appearance and finished tied for 53rd place. He recorded rounds of 72, 68, 67, and 71, finishing the tournament at 10-under par.

During the third round, Brown made five consecutive birdies as part of a seven-birdie round. His father, Rodney Brown, served as his caddie during the final two rounds of the tournament.

== Cancer diagnosis and death ==
In September 2019, the University of Kentucky announced that Brown had been diagnosed with osteosarcoma in his left thigh. The diagnosis required him to withdraw from school and step away from collegiate golf during the 2019–2020 season to undergo treatment.

Throughout his illness, Brown received support from his teammates and the University of Kentucky athletic community. The men's and women's golf programs adopted the slogan "Birdies for Brownie," commonly abbreviated as "B4B," in recognition of their teammate.

Brown died on August 4, 2020, at the age of 20.

== Legacy ==
Following Brown's death, several initiatives were established to recognize his life and accomplishments.

In August 2021, the golf course at Mineral Mound State Park in Eddyville, Kentucky, was renamed The Cullan at Mineral Mound in his honor. The course had been an important part of his development as a young golfer.

In 2024, the University of Kentucky men's golf program established the Cullan Brown Collegiate, an annual collegiate golf tournament held at Lexington Country Club. The tournament brings together collegiate golf programs and recognizes Brown's connection to Kentucky golf.

The tournament continued in 2025 and 2026, preserving his name within collegiate golf competition.

== Awards and achievements ==
- 2016 KHSAA Individual State Golf Champion
- 2016 Kentucky High School Golf Player of the Year
- 2x KHSAA Individual State Runner-up (2015, 2017)
- Rolex Junior All-American
- 3x Kentucky Junior Masters Champion
- Bass Pro Shops/Payne Stewart Junior Championship winner
- Evian Junior Cup team champion
- 2019 SEC All-Freshman Team
- 2019 Mason Rudolph Championship — T-5
- 2019 SEC Championship stroke play — T-9
- 2019 Barbasol Championship — T-53
- 2020 University of Kentucky Male Rookie of the Year

== Sources ==
- Beall, J. (2020, August 4). All-SEC golfer dies after battle with cancer. Golf Digest. https://www.golfdigest.com/story/all-sec-golfer-dies-after-battle-with-cancer
- Ross, H. (2021, July 14). Cullan Brown's memory lives on at Barbasol Championship. PGA TOUR. https://www.pgatour.com/article/news/beyond-the-ropes/2021/07/14/cullan-brown-memory-lives-on-barbasol-championship-kentucky
- Clay, J. (2019, July 12). A year ago, he was too hurt to play. Now UK golfer will tee off in his first PGA event. Lexington Herald-Leader. https://www.kentucky.com/sports/spt-columns-blogs/john-clay/article232460222.html
- Clay, J. (2021, August 4). UK golfers ‘pumped’ as late teammate's hometown course to be named ‘The Cullan.’ Lexington Herald-Leader. https://www.kentucky.com/sports/spt-columns-blogs/john-clay/article253251428.html
- Drummond, C. (2024, October 6). Cullan Brown is a Kentucky golf legend. UK is honoring him by hosting a new tournament. Lexington Herald-Leader. https://www.kentucky.com/sports/college/kentucky-sports/article293364709.html
- Moore, D. (2020, August 4). Kentucky men's golfer Cullan Brown has died. University of Kentucky Athletics. https://ukathletics.com/news/2020/08/04/kentucky-mens-golfer-cullan-brown-has-died/
- University of Kentucky Athletics. (2018). 2018–19 men's golf fact book. https://storage.googleapis.com/ukathletics-com/2022/06/d5c8c2bc-mgolf_factbook_2018_19.pdf
- University of Kentucky Athletics. (2019). 2018–19 men's golf statistics [PDF]. https://storage.googleapis.com/ukathletics-com/2022/06/f00ef509-mgolf_stats_052019.pdf
- University of Kentucky Athletics. (2019). 2019–20 men's golf fact book [PDF]. https://storage.googleapis.com/ukathletics-com/2022/06/eac6cb7e-mgolf_fact_book_2019_20.pdf
- University of Kentucky Athletics. (2020). 2019–20 men's golf statistics. https://storage.googleapis.com/ukathletics-com/2022/06/8b688f95-mgolf_stats_032320.pdf
