= Tender Is the Night =

1934 novel by F. Scott Fitzgerald

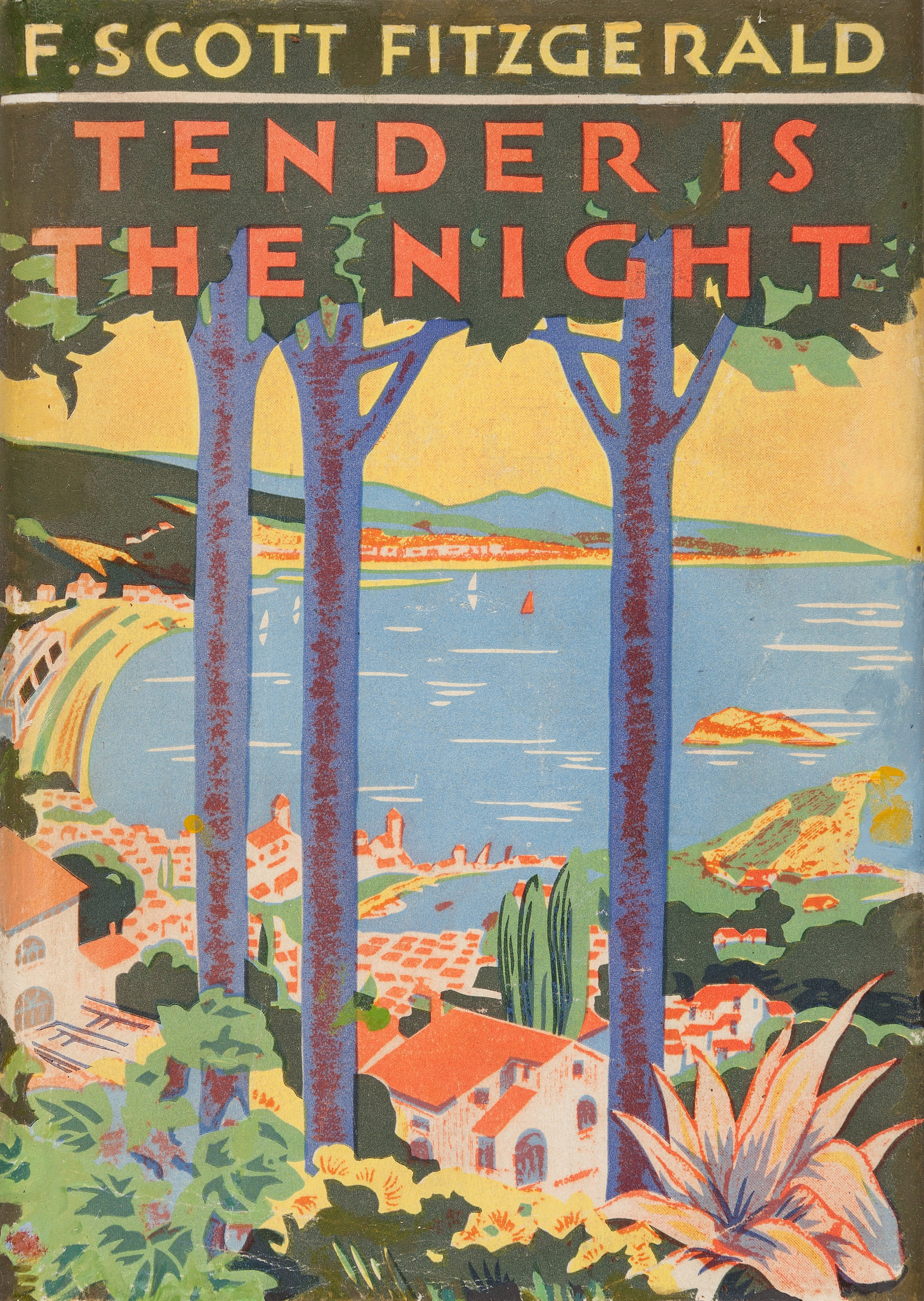
- The cover of the first edition
- Author: F. Scott Fitzgerald
- Illustrator: Edward Shenton (Note: Artist Edward Shenton illustrated the serialization, but he did not design the book's dust jacket.)
- Cover artist: Unknown (Note: Bruccoli & Baughman 1996, p. 197: The dust jacket was "unsigned and the artist has not been identified.")
- Language: English
- Genre: Tragedy
- Published: April 12, 1934
- Publisher: Charles Scribner's Sons
- Publication place: United States
- Media type: Print (hardcover & paperback)
- Preceded by: The Great Gatsby (1925)
- Followed by: The Last Tycoon (1941)

Tender Is the Night is the fourth and final novel completed by American writer F. Scott Fitzgerald. Set in the French Riviera during the twilight of the Jazz Age, the 1934 novel chronicles the rise and fall of Dick Diver, a promising young psychiatrist, and his wife, Nicole, who is one of his patients. The story mirrors events in the lives of the author and his wife Zelda Fitzgerald as Dick starts his descent into alcoholism and Nicole struggles with mental illness.

Fitzgerald began the novel in 1925 after the publication of his third novel The Great Gatsby. During the protracted writing process, the mental health of his wife rapidly deteriorated, and she required extended hospitalization due to her suicidal and homicidal tendencies. After her hospitalization in Baltimore, Maryland, the author rented the La Paix estate in the suburb of Towson to be close to his wife, and he continued his work on the manuscript.

While working on the book, Fitzgerald was beset with financial difficulties and drank heavily. He kept afloat by borrowing money from both his editor Max Perkins and his agent Harold Ober, as well as writing short stories for commercial magazines. Fitzgerald completed the work in fall 1933, and Scribner's Magazine serialized the novel in four installments between January and April 1934 before its publication on April 12, 1934. Although artist Edward Shenton illustrated the serialization, he did not design the book's jacket. The jacket was by an unknown artist, and Fitzgerald disliked it. The title is taken from the poem "Ode to a Nightingale" by John Keats.

Two versions of the novel are in print. The first version, published in 1934, uses analepsis; the second, revised version, prepared by Fitzgerald's friend and critic Malcolm Cowley on the basis of notes for a revision left by Fitzgerald, is ordered chronologically and was first published posthumously in 1948. Critics suggested that Cowley's revision was undertaken due to negative reviews of the temporal structure of the first version of the book.

Fitzgerald considered the novel to be his masterwork. Although it received a tepid response upon release, it has grown in acclaim over the years and is now regarded as among Fitzgerald's best works. In 1998, the Modern Library ranked the novel 28th on its list of the 100 best English-language novels of the 20th century.

== Plot summary ==
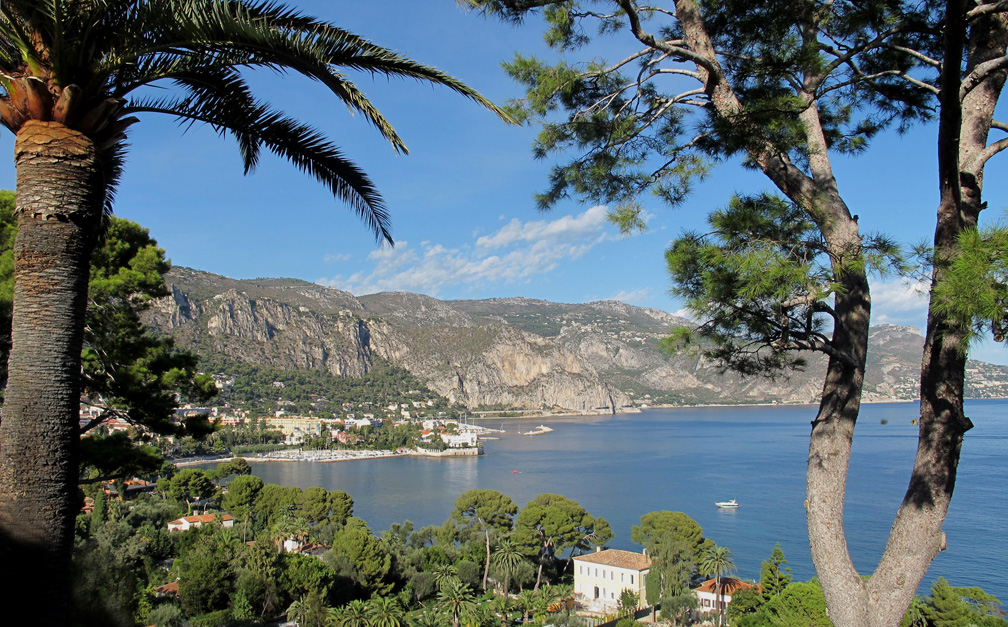
The French Riviera serves as the setting for the first third of the novel.

Dick and Nicole Diver are a glamorous couple who rent a villa in the South of France and surround themselves with a coterie of American expatriates. Rosemary Hoyt, a 17-year-old actress, and her mother are staying at a nearby resort. Rosemary becomes infatuated with Dick and becomes close to Nicole.

Rosemary senses something is wrong with the couple, and her suspicions are confirmed when another guest at a party, Violet McKisco, reports witnessing Nicole's nervous breakdown in a bathroom. Tommy Barban, another guest, comes to the defense of Nicole and insists that Violet is lying. Angered by this accusation, Violet's husband Albert duels Barban on the beach, but both men miss their shots. Following these events, Dick, Nicole, Rosemary, and others depart the French Riviera.

Soon after, Rosemary is now a constant companion of both Dick and Nicole in Paris. She attempts to seduce Dick in her hotel room, but he rebuffs her advances, although he admits that he loves her. Much later, a black man named Jules Peterson is found murdered in Rosemary's bed at the hotel, a potential scandal that could destroy Rosemary's career. Dick moves the blood-soaked body out of the room to cover up any implied sexual relationship between Rosemary and Peterson.

A flashback occurs in the narrative. In Spring 1917, Dick Diver—a promising young doctor—visits psychopathologist Franz Gregorovius in Zurich, Switzerland. While visiting Franz, he meets a patient named Nicole Warren, a wealthy young woman whose sexual abuse by her father has led to mental neuroses. (Note: There is a scholarly debate regarding whether Nicole Driver's incestuous rape is based on Zelda's troubled relationship with her father, Anthony D. Sayre. Mary Jo Tate states there is no confirming evidence that Zelda was the victim of incest.) Over a period of time they exchange letters. With the permission of Franz who believes that Dick's friendship benefits Nicole's well-being, they start seeing each other. As Nicole's treatment progresses, she becomes infatuated with Dick who, in turn, develops Florence Nightingale syndrome. He determines to marry Nicole in order to provide her with lasting emotional stability.

Don't you worry I surrender
Days are long and life's a bender
Still I know that
Tender is the Night.

— F. Scott Fitzgerald

Dick is offered a partnership in a Swiss psychiatric clinic by Franz, and Nicole uses her finances to pay for the enterprise. After his father's death, Dick travels to America for the burial and then journeys to Rome in hopes of seeing Rosemary. They start a brief affair which ends abruptly and painfully. A heartbroken Dick is involved in an altercation with the Italian police and is physically beaten. Nicole's sister helps him to get out of jail. After this public humiliation, his incipient alcoholism increases. When his alcoholism threatens his medical practice, Dick's ownership share of the clinic is purchased by American investors following Franz's suggestion.

Dick and Nicole's marriage disintegrates as he pines for Rosemary who has become a successful Hollywood star. Nicole distances herself from Dick as his self-confidence and friendliness turn into sarcasm and rudeness towards everyone. His constant unhappiness over what he could have been fuels his alcoholism, and Dick becomes embarrassing in social and familial situations. A lonely Nicole enters into an affair with Tommy Barban. (Note: The relationship between Nicole Diver and Tommy Barban parallels the actual relationship between Zelda and Edouard Jozan.) She later divorces Dick and marries her lover.

== Major characters ==
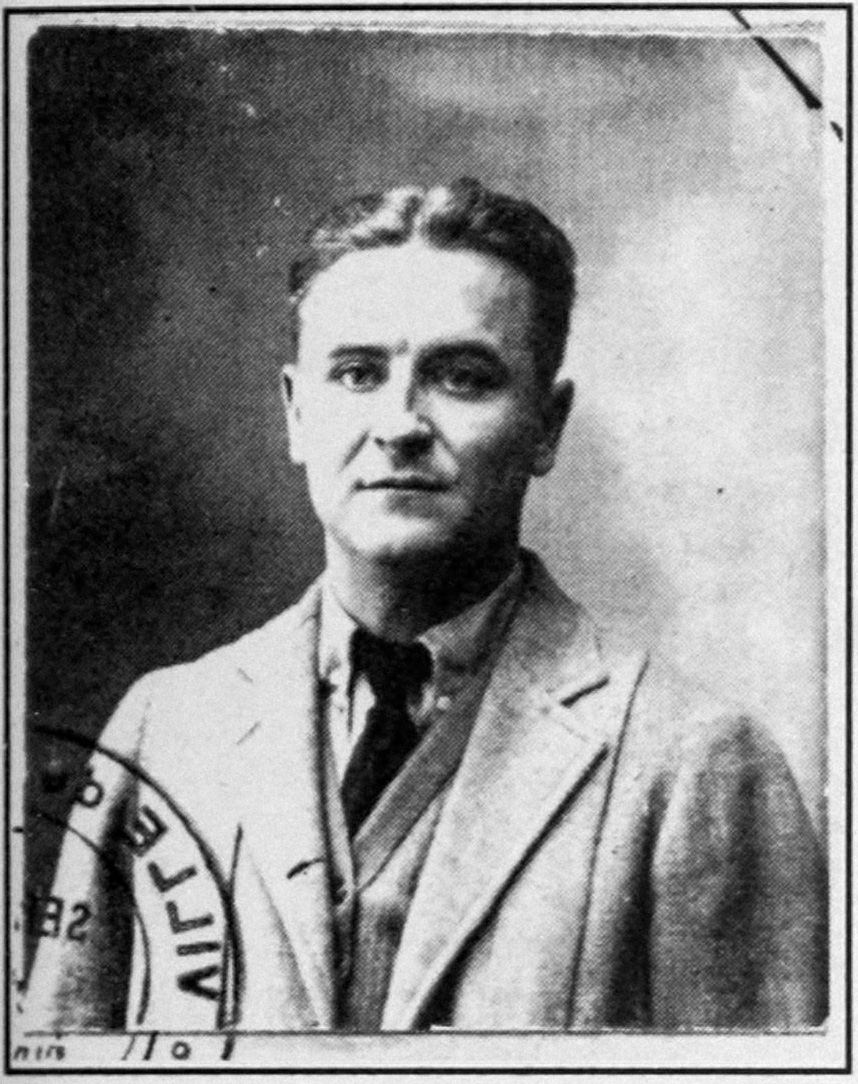
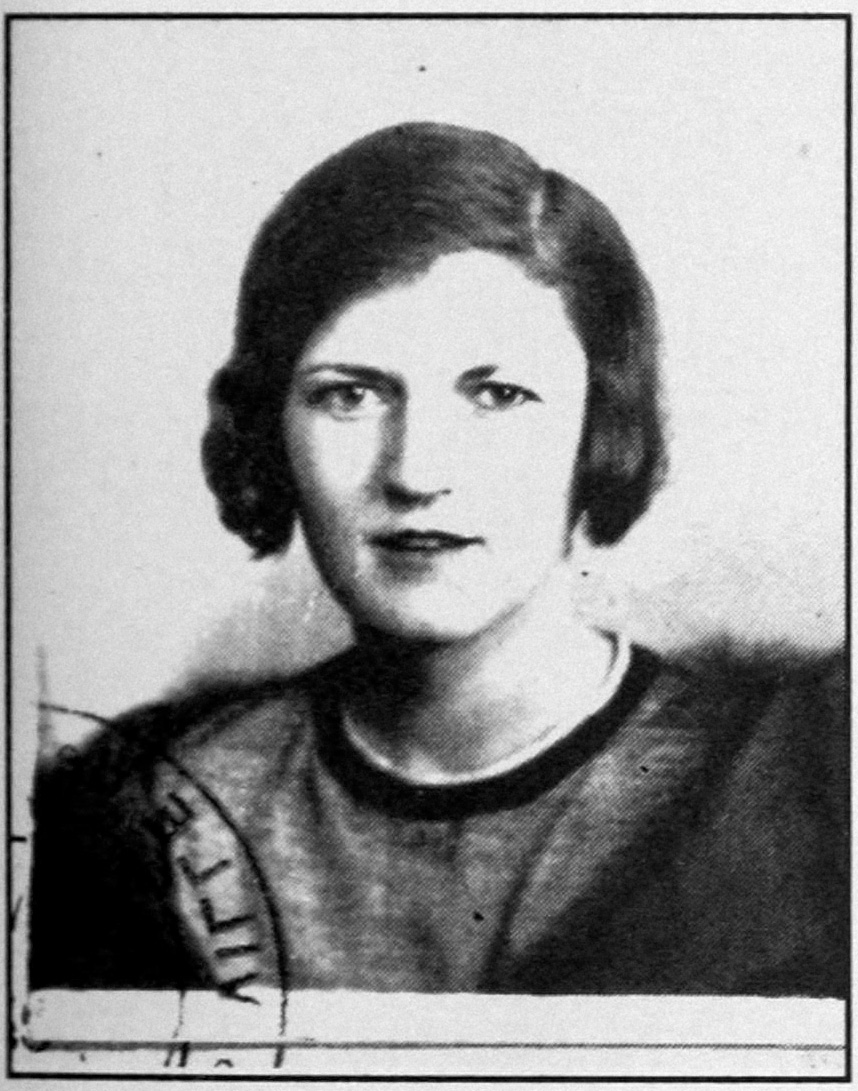
French identity cards for F. Scott Fitzgerald and Zelda Fitzgerald circa 1929, the year in which Zelda's mental health deteriorated, and she experienced homicidal and suicidal tendencies necessitating psychiatric care. The characters of Dick and Nicole Diver are based on them.
- Richard "Dick" Diver – a promising young psychiatrist and Yale alumnus who marries his patient Nicole Diver and becomes an alcoholic.
- Nicole Diver (née Warren) – an affluent mental patient who was the victim of incest and who marries Dick Diver. Based on Zelda Fitzgerald.
- Devereux Warren – Nicole's father who raped her as a young girl, which causes her to have schizophrenia.
- Rosemary Hoyt – an 18-year-old Hollywood actress who falls in love with Dick Diver. Based on teenage starlet Lois Moran.
- Tommy Barban – a Franco-American soldier-of-fortune with whom Nicole Diver has an affair. Based on French aviator Edouard Jozan, and on Italian-American pianist composer Mario Braggiotti.
- Franz Gregorovious – a Swiss psychopathologist at Dohmler's clinic who introduces a young Dick Diver to Nicole Warren, his patient.
- Beth "Baby" Warren – an unmarried spinster who is Nicole's older sibling and who disapproves of her marriage to Dick Diver.
- Abe North – an alcoholic composer who is later murdered in a New York speakeasy. Based on Ring Lardner and Charles MacArthur.
- Mary North – the spirited wife of Abe North who divorces him, remarries, and becomes the wealthy Countess of Minghetti.
- Albert McKisco – an American novelist who wins a duel against Tommy Barban. Based on novelist Robert McAlmon.
- Violet McKisco – the gossipy spouse of Albert McKisco who discovers Nicole's insanity and attempts to malign her reputation.
- Jules Peterson – a black man from Scandinavia who helps Abe North and is later found dead in Rosemary Hoyt's hotel suite.

== Background and composition ==
=== Sojourn in Europe ===
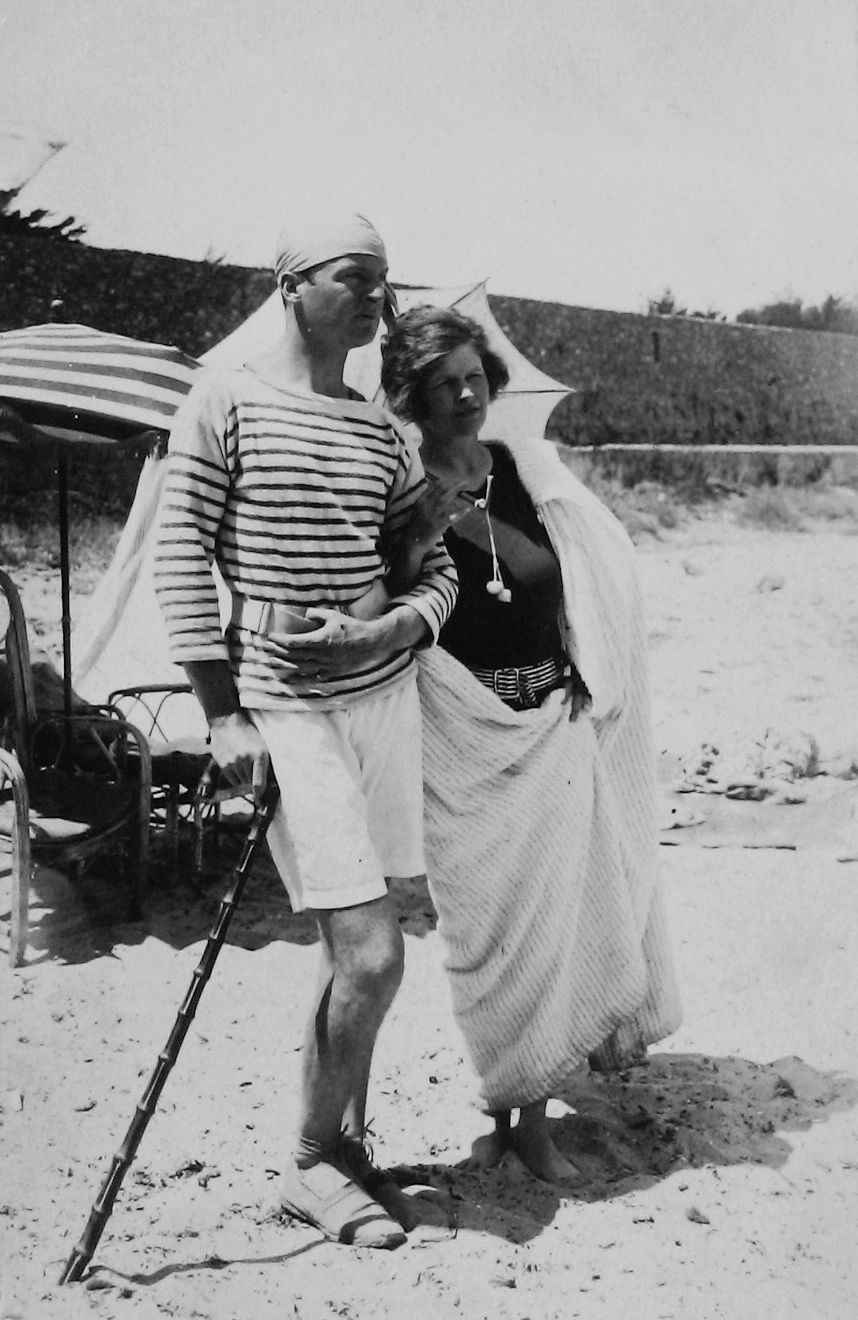
Gerald and Sara Murphy, upon whom characters in Tender Is the Night were based

While abroad in Europe, F. Scott Fitzgerald began writing his fourth novel almost three weeks after the publication of The Great Gatsby in April 1925. He planned to tell the story of Francis Melarkey, a young Hollywood technician visiting the French Riviera with his domineering mother. Francis falls in with a circle of charming American expatriates, emotionally disintegrates, and kills his mother. Fitzgerald's tentative titles for the novel were "World's Fair," "Our Type" and "The Boy Who Killed His Mother." The characters of the charming American expatriates were based on Fitzgerald's acquaintances Gerald and Sara Murphy and were named Seth and Dinah Piper. Francis was intended to fall in love with Dinah, an event that would precipitate his disintegration.

Fitzgerald wrote five drafts of this earlier version of the novel in 1925 and 1926, but he was unable to finish it. Nearly all of what he wrote made it into the finished work in altered form. Francis's arrival on the Riviera with his mother, and his introduction to the world of the Pipers, was transposed into Rosemary Hoyt's arrival with her mother, and her introduction to the world of Dick and Nicole Diver. Characters created in this early version survived into the final novel, particularly Abe and Mary North (originally Grant) and the McKiscos.

Several incidents, such as Rosemary's arrival and early scenes on the beach, her visit to the Riviera movie studio, and the dinner party at the Divers' villa, all appeared in this original version, but with Francis in the role of the wide-eyed outsider that would later be filled by Rosemary. Also, the sequence in which a drunken Dick is beaten by police in Rome was written in this first version as well and was based on a real incident that happened to Fitzgerald in Rome in 1924.

=== Return to America ===
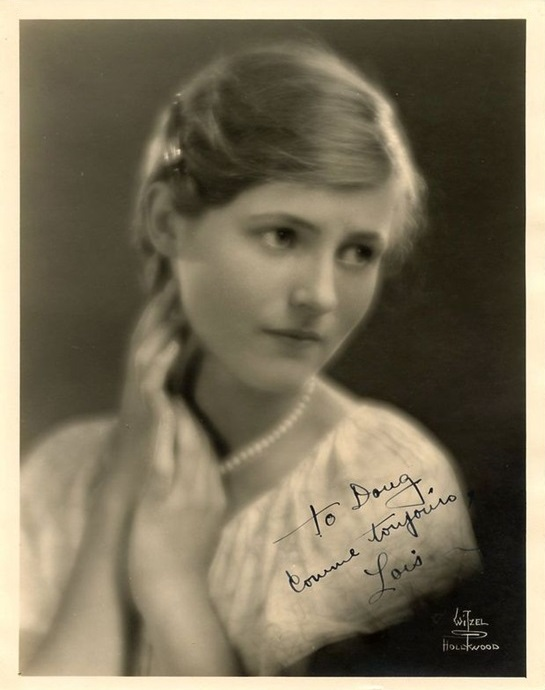
Actress Lois Moran, with whom Fitzgerald had a relationship, inspired the character of Rosemary Hoyt

After a certain point, Fitzgerald became stymied with the novel. He, Zelda, and their daughter Scottie returned to the United States in December 1926 after several years in Europe. Film producer John W. Considine Jr. invited Fitzgerald to Hollywood during its golden age to write a flapper comedy for United Artists. He agreed and moved into a studio-owned bungalow with Zelda in January 1927. In Hollywood, the Fitzgeralds attended parties where they danced the black bottom and mingled with film stars.

While attending a lavish party at the Pickfair estate, Fitzgerald met 17-year-old Lois Moran, a starlet who had gained widespread fame for her role in Stella Dallas (1925). Desperate for intellectual conversation, Moran and Fitzgerald discussed literature and philosophy for hours while sitting on a staircase. Fitzgerald was 31 years old and past his prime, but the smitten Moran regarded him as a sophisticated, handsome, and gifted writer. Consequently, she pursued a relationship with him. The starlet became a muse for the author, and he wrote her into a short story called "Magnetism", in which a young Hollywood film starlet causes a married writer to waver in his sexual devotion to his wife. Fitzgerald later rewrote Rosemary Hoyt—one of the central characters in Tender is the Night—to mirror Moran.

Jealous of Fitzgerald's relationship with Moran, an irate Zelda set fire to her expensive clothing in a bathtub as a self-destructive act. She disparaged the teenage Moran as "a breakfast food that many men identified with whatever they missed from life." Fitzgerald's relations with Moran further exacerbated the Fitzgeralds' marital difficulties and, after merely two months in Hollywood, the unhappy couple departed for Delaware in March 1927.

Fitzgerald supported himself and his family in the late 1920s with his lucrative short-story output for slick magazines such as the Saturday Evening Post, but he was haunted by his inability to progress on the novel. Around 1929, he tried a new angle on the material, starting over with a shipboard story about a Hollywood director, Lew Kelly, and his wife, Nicole, as well as a young actress named Rosemary. But Fitzgerald only completed two chapters of this version.

=== Zelda's mental deterioration ===
I always feel shocked and apologetic when I find myself momentarily in a calm mood... its so rare to find the appropriate emotion going toward the appropriate object... I'm rather angry because people won't let me be insane.

— Zelda Fitzgerald, private correspondence during her first hospitalization in 1930

By Spring 1929, the Fitzgeralds had returned to Europe and, during their sojourn in France, Zelda's mental health deteriorated. Zelda had undergone three abortions in the preceding years, and her sister Rosalind speculated that the lingering effects of these procedures exacerbated her mental deterioration. During this period, Zelda became obsessed with dreams of fame as a prima ballerina. According to their daughter Scottie, Scott Fitzgerald supported Zelda's ambitions and paid for her ballet lessons.

Zelda practiced ballet for up to eight hours a day, a grueling regimen that ruined her health and precipitated a nervous breakdown. One evening, her husband returned home to find Zelda, unable to speak, collapsed on the floor and entranced with a pile of dust. After summoning a French physician, the doctor examined an incommunicable Zelda and concluded that she had suffered a mental collapse.

A month later, in October 1929, during an automobile trip to Paris along the mountainous roads of the Grande Corniche, Zelda seized the car's steering wheel and tried to kill herself, her husband, and their 9-year-old daughter Scottie by driving over a cliff. After this homicidal and suicidal incident, doctors diagnosed Zelda with schizophrenia. Dr. Oscar Forel wrote in his diagnosis: "The more I saw Zelda, the more I thought at the time [that] she is neither [suffering from] a pure neurosis nor a real psychosis—I considered her a constitutional, emotionally unbalanced psychopath—she may improve, [but] never completely recover." At the nadir of her mental health struggles, she engaged in coprophagia, the compulsive consumption of feces.

Seeking a cure for her mental illness, the couple traveled to Switzerland where Zelda underwent further treatment at a clinic. Zelda's ingravescent mental illness and the death of Fitzgerald's father in 1931 dispirited the author. Devastated by these events, an alcoholic Fitzgerald settled in suburban Baltimore where he rented the La Paix estate from architect Bayard Turnbull. He decided the novel's final plot would involve a young man of great potential who marries a mentally ill woman and sinks into despair and alcoholism when their doomed marriage fails.

=== Final draft and publication ===
The case of F. Scott Fitzgerald has become distressing. He is boozing in a wild manner and has become a nuisance. His wife, Zelda, who has been insane for years, is now confined at the Sheppard-Pratt Hospital, and he is living in Park Avenue with his little daughter, Scottie.

— H. L. Mencken, 1934 diary entry

Fitzgerald wrote the final version of Tender Is the Night in 1932 and 1933. He salvaged almost everything he had written for the earlier Melarkey draft of the novel, as well as borrowed ideas and phrases from many short stories he had written in the years since completing The Great Gatsby.

He poured everything he had into Tender—his feelings regarding his wasted talent and self-perceived professional failure; his animosity towards his parents; his marriage to Zelda and her mental illness; his infatuation with actress Lois Moran, and Zelda's affair with the French aviator Edouard Jozan.

Fitzgerald finished the work in the autumn of 1933, and it was serialized in Scribner's Magazine over four parts from January to April 1934, leading up to its release on April 12, 1934. Although Edward Shenton provided illustrations for the serialization, he wasn't responsible for the book's jacket design, which was done by an unknown artist and not favored by Fitzgerald. The title of the novel was inspired by John Keats' poem "Ode to a Nightingale".

== Critical reception ==
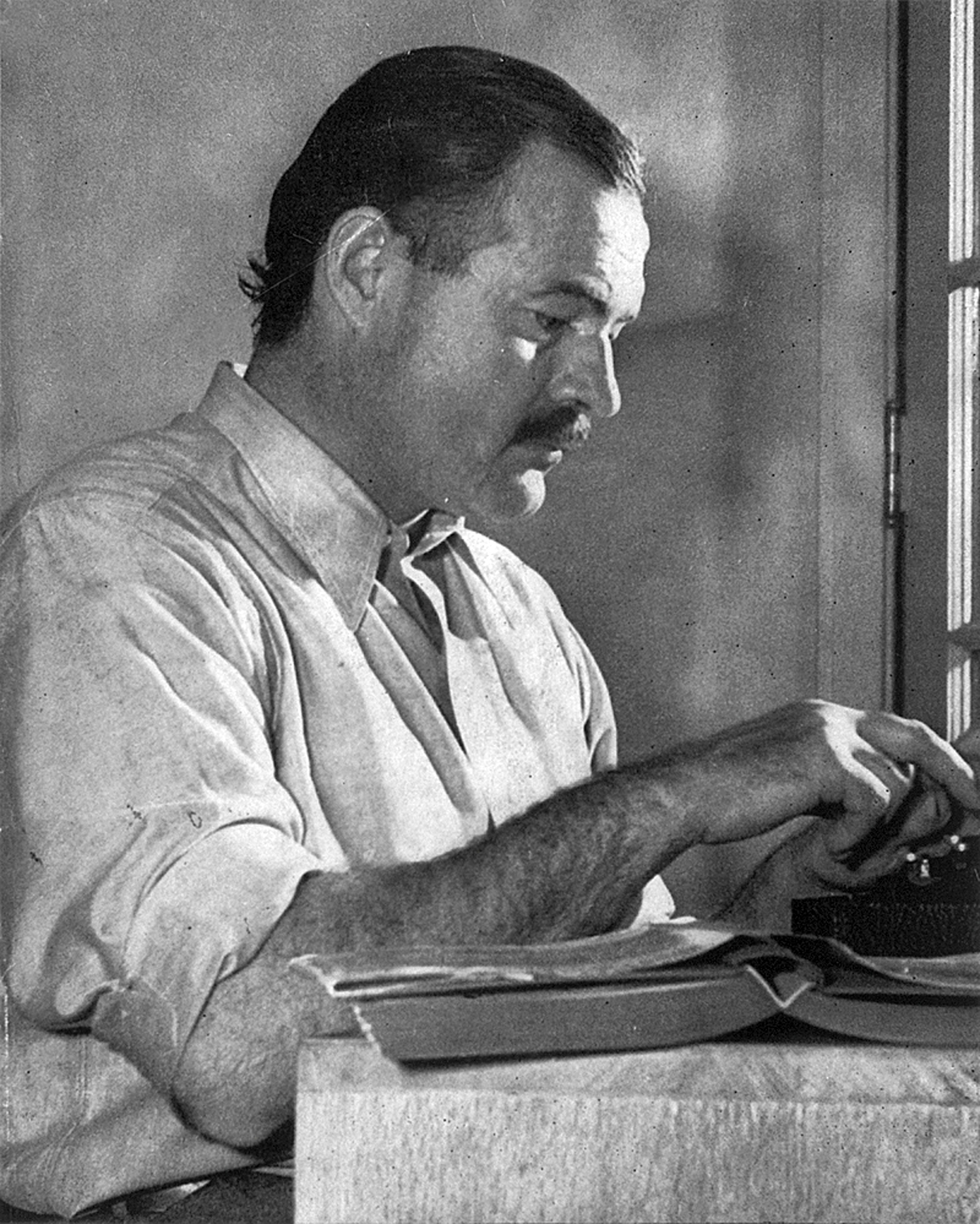
Ernest Hemingway believed that the negative reaction by literary critics towards Fitzgerald's novel stemmed from Depression-era America's reaction to Fitzgerald's status as a symbol of Jazz Age excess.

Fitzgerald regarded the novel as his masterwork and believed it would eclipse the acclaim of his previous works. It was instead met with lukewarm sales and mixed reviews. One book review in The New York Times by critic J. Donald Adams was particularly harsh:

"Bad news is best blurted out at once: Tender Is the Night is a disappointment. Though it displays Mr. Fitzgerald’s most engaging qualities, it makes his weaknesses appear ineradicable, for they are present in equal measure and in undiminished form.... His new book is clever and brilliantly surfaced, but it is not the work of a wise and mature novelist."

In contrast to the negative review in The New York Times, critic Burke Van Allen hailed the novel as a masterpiece in an April 1934 review in The Brooklyn Daily Eagle:

"Besides Mr. Fitzgerald, no American novelist... has written four novels without a bad one, with a constantly growing mastery of his equipment, and a regularly increasing sensitivity to the esthetic values in life. Scott Fitzgerald grows, and his literature was born imposing... The variation of mood with which he has four times accomplished... is extraordinary. The mood in This Side of Paradise was vindictive and rebellious; in The Beautiful and Damned sour and satirical; in Gatsby straightforward and tragic, inevitable, and in Tender Is the Night it is stained with a civilized and wounding brutality. It is necessary to say that I, the reviewer, have never used this severe word in print before: masterpiece."

Three months after its publication, Tender Is the Night had sold only 12,000 copies compared to This Side of Paradise which sold over 50,000 copies. Despite a number of positive reviews, a consensus emerged that the novel's Jazz Age setting and subject matter were both outdated and uninteresting to readers. The unexpected failure of the novel puzzled Fitzgerald for the remainder of his life.

Various hypotheses have arisen as to why the novel did not receive a warmer reception upon release. Fitzgerald's friend, author Ernest Hemingway, opined that critics had initially only been interested in dissecting its weaknesses, rather than giving due credit to its merits. He argued that such overly harsh criticism stemmed from superficial readings of the material and Depression-era America's reaction to Fitzgerald's status as a symbol of Jazz Age excess. In his later years, Hemingway re-read the work and remarked that, in retrospect, "Tender Is the Night gets better and better".

== Critical analysis ==
Several critics have interpreted the novel as a feminist work and posited that the patriarchal attitudes of the reactionary 1930s underlie the critical dismissal. They have noted the parallels between Dick Diver and Jay Gatsby, with many regarding the novel and particularly Diver's character, as Fitzgerald's most emotionally and psychologically complex work.

Christian Messenger argues that Fitzgerald's book hinges on the sustaining sentimental fragments: "On an aesthetic level, Fitzgerald's working through of sentiment's broken premises and rhetoric in Tender heralds a triumph of modernism in his attempt to sustain his sentimental fragments and allegiances in new forms." He calls it "F. Scott Fitzgerald's richest novel, replete with vivid characters, gorgeous prose, and shocking scenes," and calls attention to Slavoj Žižek's use of the book to illustrate the nonlinear nature of experience.

== Legacy and influence ==
Following Fitzgerald's death in 1940, Tender Is the Night's critical reputation has steadily grown. Later critics have described it as "an exquisitely crafted piece of fiction" and "one of the greatest American novels". It is now widely regarded as among Fitzgerald's most accomplished works, with some agreeing with the author's assessment that it surpasses The Great Gatsby.

In 1998, the Modern Library included the novel at #28 on its list of the 100 best English-language novels of the 20th century. Radcliffe later included it at #62 in its rival list. NPR included it at #69 on its 2009 list titled 100 Years, 100 Novels. In 2012 it was listed as one of the 1001 Books You Must Read Before You Die.

Writer Dan Houser, creator of Grand Theft Auto and Red Dead Redemption, has praised the novel, saying, "I prefer [Tender is the Night] to Gatsby. They're both amazing, but this, it's broader."

== Adaptations ==
In 1955, an hour-long adaptation was broadcast live by CBS on the General Electric sponsored show "Front Row Center", with Mercedes McCambridge as Nicole Diver. Dick Diver was played by James Daly. The telefilm was written by Whitfield Cook and directed and produced by McCambridge’s then-husband, Fletcher Markle. It featured original music by eminent composer David Raksin. New York Times reviewer John P. Shanley panned it as "an inept conception" and "an unforgivable treatment of a gifted author's work."

In 1962, a film adaptation was released with Jason Robards as Dick Diver and Jennifer Jones as Nicole Diver. The song "Tender Is the Night" from the movie soundtrack was nominated for the 1962 Academy Awards for Best Song.

Two decades later, in 1985, a television mini-series of the book was co-produced by the BBC, 20th Century Fox Television, and Showtime Entertainment. The mini-series featured Peter Strauss as Dick Diver, Mary Steenburgen as Nicole Diver, and Sean Young as Rosemary Hoyt.

In 1995, a stage adaptation by Simon Levy, with permission of the Fitzgerald Estate, was produced at The Fountain Theatre, Los Angeles. It won the PEN Literary Award in Drama and several other awards.

Boris Eifman's 2015 ballet Up and Down is based loosely on the novel.
