= William McFee =

English writer (1881–1966)

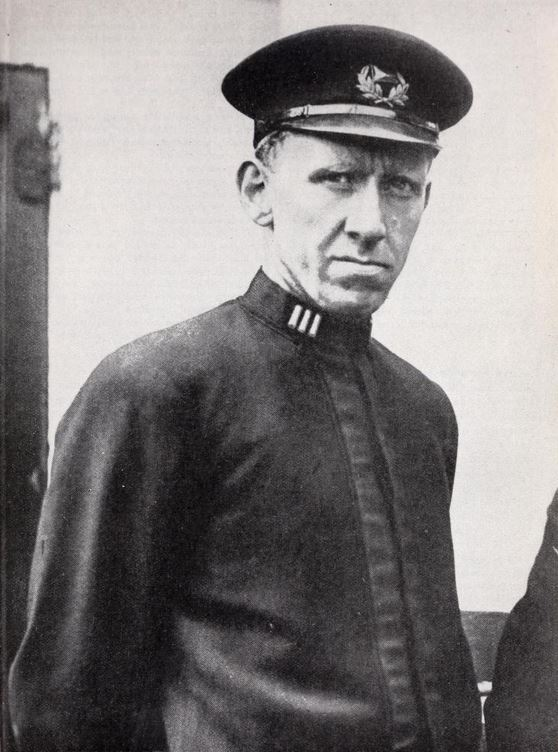
- Born: William Morley Punshon McFee; 15 June 1881; London, England
- Died: 2 July 1966 (aged 85); New Milford, Connecticut, United States
- Occupation: Writer
- Writing career
- Period: 1908–1952
- Genre: Sea story

William Morley Punshon McFee (15 June 1881 – 2 July 1966) was an English writer of sea stories. Both of his parents were Canadian.

== Early years ==
The son of John McFee and Hilda Wallace McFee, he was born (as was his sister) on the Erin's Isle, a three-masted ship owned by his father, a sea captain, in London, England. The McFee family lived in New Southgate, a northern suburb of London. He was educated at Culford School, in Culford, England.

As a youth, McFee worked in an engineering shop at Aldersgate, wrote a 40-page poem, and lectured on Rudyard Kipling.

== Sailing ==
McFee became a mechanical engineer at Richard Moreland & Sons and W. Summerscales & Sons in the City, before going to sea as a marine engineer in 1906. He rose to the rank of chief engineer in ships of the Woodfield SS Co. He migrated to the United States in 1911 and wrote books, afterwards going to sea in ships of the United Fruit Company. During World War I, McFee served in the Royal Navy as an engineer in various transport ships.

After the war, he returned to the United States to live in Roxbury, Connecticut. He was with the United Fruit Company, as a chief engineer until 1924 when he turned definitively to writing.

== Writing ==
In addition to books, he also wrote reviews for The New York Sun and The New York Times. One of his book reviews was for the novel Save Me the Waltz (1932) by Zelda Fitzgerald, in which he said, "In this book, with all its crudity of conception, its ruthless purloinings of technical tricks and its pathetic striving after philosophic profundity, there is the promise of a new and vigorous personality in fiction." Fitzgerald said that of all the negative reviews of her book, his "was at least intelligible."

McFee's works included In the First Watch (1946), an autobiography, published by Random House of Canada. He wrote several collections of memoirs. His hobby was making ship models.

== Personal life ==
While in the navy, McFee met Pauline Khondoff, a Bulgarian refugee. The couple wed in 1920, but divorced in 1932. He was married twice more, first to Beatrice Allender who died in 1952 and then to Dorothy North.

McFee became a United States citizen in 1925.

== Recognition ==
In 1936, Yale University conferred an honorary Master of Arts degree on McFee.

== Works ==
Great Sea Stories of Modern Times (1953 ed.), edited by William McFee

- Letters from an Ocean Tramp. Cassell & Company, Inc. 1908.
- Aliens. Edward Arnold. 1914.
- Casuals of the Sea. Doubleday & Company, Inc. 1916.
- Aliens. Doubleday, Page & Co. 1919.
- Captain Macedoine's Daughter. Doubleday, Page & Co. 1920.
- A Six Hour Shift. Doubleday, Page & Co. 1920.
- Harbours of Memory. Doubleday, Page & Co. 1922.
- Command. Doubleday, Page & Co. 1922.
- Race. Doubleday, Page & Co. 1924.
- Sunlight in New Granada. Doubleday, Page & Co. 1925.
- Swallowing the anchor: Being a revised and enlarged collection of notes made by an engineer in the merchant service who secured leave of absence from his ship to investigate & report upon the alleged superiority of life ashore. Doubleday, Page & Co. 1925.
- Pilgrims of Adversity. Doubleday, Doran & Co. 1928.
- Life of Sir Martin Frobisher. J. Lane, Bodley Head. 1928.
- North of Suez. Doubleday, Doran & Co. 1930.
- Sailors of Fortune. William Heinemann Ltd. 1930.
- The Harbourmaster. Doubleday, Doran & Co. 1931.
- No Castle in Spain. Doubleday, Doran & Co. 1933.
- More Harbours of Memory. Doubleday, Doran & Co. 1934.
- The Beachcomber. Doubleday, Doran & Co. 1935.
- Sailor's Wisdom. J. Cape. 1935.
- The Beachcomber. Doubleday, Doran & Co. 1935.
- Sailor's Bane. Ritten House. 1936.
- The Derelicts. Faber & Faber. 1938.
- The Watch Below. Random House. 1940.
- Spenlove in Arcady. Random House. 1940.
- A Conrad Argosy. Doubleday, Doran & Co. 1942.
- Ship to Shore. Random House. 1944.
- In the First Watch. Random House. 1946.
- Family Trouble. Random House. 1949.
- The Law of the Sea. J.B. Lippincott Co. 1950.
- The Adopted. Faber. 1952.
