= Willis B. Machen =

American politician (1810–1893)

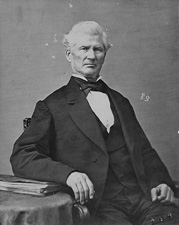
- Official Congressional portrait

United States Senator from Kentucky
- In office September 27, 1872 – March 3, 1873
- Preceded by: Garrett Davis
- Succeeded by: Thomas C. McCreery

Member of the Kentucky House of Representatives from Caldwell and Lyon Counties
- In office August 1860 – August 5, 1861
- Preceded by: William B. Acree
- Succeeded by: W. H. Edmunds (Caldwell); George R. Merritt (Livingston and Lyon)
- In office August 3, 1857 – August 1, 1859
- Preceded by: George B. Cook
- Succeeded by: William B. Acree

Member of the Kentucky Senate from the 11th district
- In office September 1853 – August 6, 1855
- Preceded by: Joseph S. Conn
- Succeeded by: John Q. A. King

Personal details
- Born: April 10, 1810 Caldwell County, Kentucky, US
- Died: September 29, 1893 (aged 83) Hopkinsville, Kentucky, US
- Resting place: Riverview Cemetery, Eddyville, Kentucky
- Party: Democratic
- Spouses: Margaret Aurelia Lyon (m. 1835; died 1852) Eliza N. Dobbins (m. 1852; died 1859) Victoria Theresa Mims (m. 1859)
- Relations: Son-in-law of Chittenden Lyon; Grandfather of Zelda Fitzgerald; Father-in-law of Anthony D. Sayre
- Children: at least 17
- Education: Cumberland College
- Occupation: Farmer, Iron worker
- Profession: Lawyer

Willis Benson Machen (April 10, 1810 – September 29, 1893) was an American politician who was a Democratic U.S. Senator from Kentucky from 1872 to 1873.

== Early life ==
Willis Benson Machen was born the son of Henry Ballenger Machen and Nancy Machen (née Tarrant) on April 10, 1810, in Caldwell County, Kentucky (now Lyon County, Kentucky). He attended the common schools in the area and became a farmer. Machen attended Cumberland College in Princeton, and then engaged in agricultural pursuits near Eddyville.

In addition to farming, Machen worked at the Livingston iron forge. Soon, he and a partner opened their own business, but it failed and nearly led Machen to financial ruin. Eventually, he was able to repay his debts, and he began building turnpikes. An injury forced him to abandon that course as well, so he turned to the practice of law. He was admitted to the bar in 1844 and quickly built up a large clientele.

Machen was married three times and was widowed twice. Machen married, first, Margaret Aurelia Lyon, daughter of U.S. Representative Chittenden Lyon and granddaughter of U.S. Representative Colonel Matthew Lyon, on December 28, 1835. They had at least six children: a daughter, Mary J. Machen (1838–1854) and five sons, Edward Chittenden Machen (1840–1845), Henry Lyon Machen (1843–1893), Edward C. Machen (1846–after 1887), Willis Benson Machen Jr. (1849–1851) and Willis Benson Machen III (1851–1852). His wife died in 1852 and in the same year he married his second wife Eliza N. Dobbins. They had three children: one son, John S. Machen and two daughters, Mary E. Machen and Elizabeth Machen. He was again widowed in 1859. He married thirdly Victoria Theresa Mims, daughter of John Harrison Mims and Caroline Hanson (Cresap) Mims, on September 10, 1859. They had eight children (at least three died in childhood): sons, Frank P. Machen, Willis B. Machen (IV) (1872–1903), Charles Victor Machen and Albert Sidney Machen (1875–1876) and daughters, Minerva Buckner "Minnie" (Machen) Sayre (1860–1958) (the wife of Anthony D. Sayre and mother of Zelda Sayre Fitzgerald), Maggie Davis Machen (1862–1864), Caroline Mims Machen (1874–1874) and Marjorie Lee (Machen) Rieke (1881–1913).

== Political career ==
Machen was delegate to the State constitutional convention in 1849, was a member of the Kentucky Senate in 1854, and was a member of the Kentucky House of Representatives in 1856 and 1860.

When a group of secessionist Kentuckians formed a Confederate government for the state, the Kentucky Confederate legislative council elected Machen as its president. Machen represented Kentucky's 1st congressional district in the First Confederate Congress, serving on the Accounts and Ways and Means Committees. He was re-elected to the Second Confederate Congress and worked in the quartermaster and commissary departments. In total, he served in the Confederate Congress from February 22, 1862, until its dissolution in April 1865.

After the close of the war, Machen, fearing reprisals for his alignment with the Confederacy, fled to Canada; his third wife and daughters Minnie and Marjorie joined him there. In 1869, President Ulysses S. Grant issued a pardon for Machen, and he returned to Kentucky.

Friends encouraged Machen to run for governor, but there were questions about his eligibility, and he declined. On July 9, 1872, Kentucky's delegates to the Democratic National Convention in Baltimore, Maryland nominated Machen for the office of Vice-President of the United States; he received one electoral vote.

On September 22, 1872, Governor Preston H. Leslie appointed Machen to the United States Senate to fill the vacancy caused by the death of Garrett Davis. When the Kentucky Senate re-convened, he was formally elected to the seat on January 21, 1873, defeating Republican Tarvin Baker by a vote of 104–18. He served from September 27, 1872, to March 3, 1873.

== Later life ==
Following his congressional tenure, he resumed agricultural interests. He also jointly owned several iron furnaces in Lyon County; it was at one of these furnaces that William Kelly invented his process for making steel rails. In 1880, Machen was appointed to the Kentucky Railroad Commission, serving one full term.

Following his term on the railroad commission, Machen retired to Mineral Mound, his 1,000-acre (4 km^{2}) estate on the Cumberland River near Eddyville, where he raised tobacco. He died on September 29, 1893, at the Western Asylum in Hopkinsville, Kentucky, and was interred in Riverview Cemetery in Eddyville. Today, Machen's former estate is the site of Mineral Mound State Park.

Machen was the grandfather of Zelda Fitzgerald. He died before she was born.

U.S. Senate
Preceded by Garrett Davis	U.S. senator (Class 3) from Kentucky; 1872–1873; Served alongside: John W. Stevenson	Succeeded by Thomas C. McCreery
