= First White House of the Confederacy =

Historic house in Alabama, United States

- U.S. National Register of Historic Places
- Alabama Register of Landmarks and Heritage
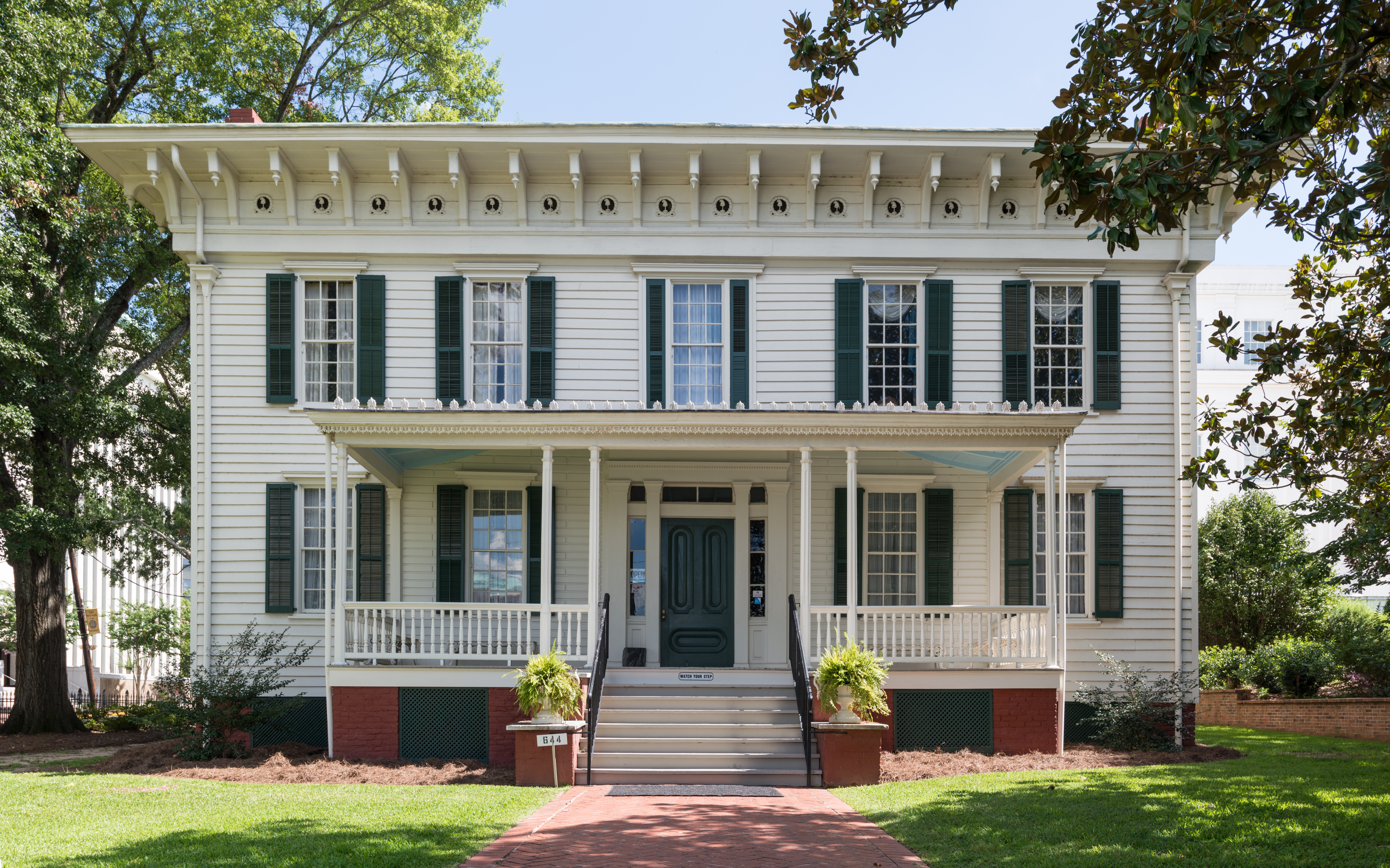
- First White House of the Confederacy

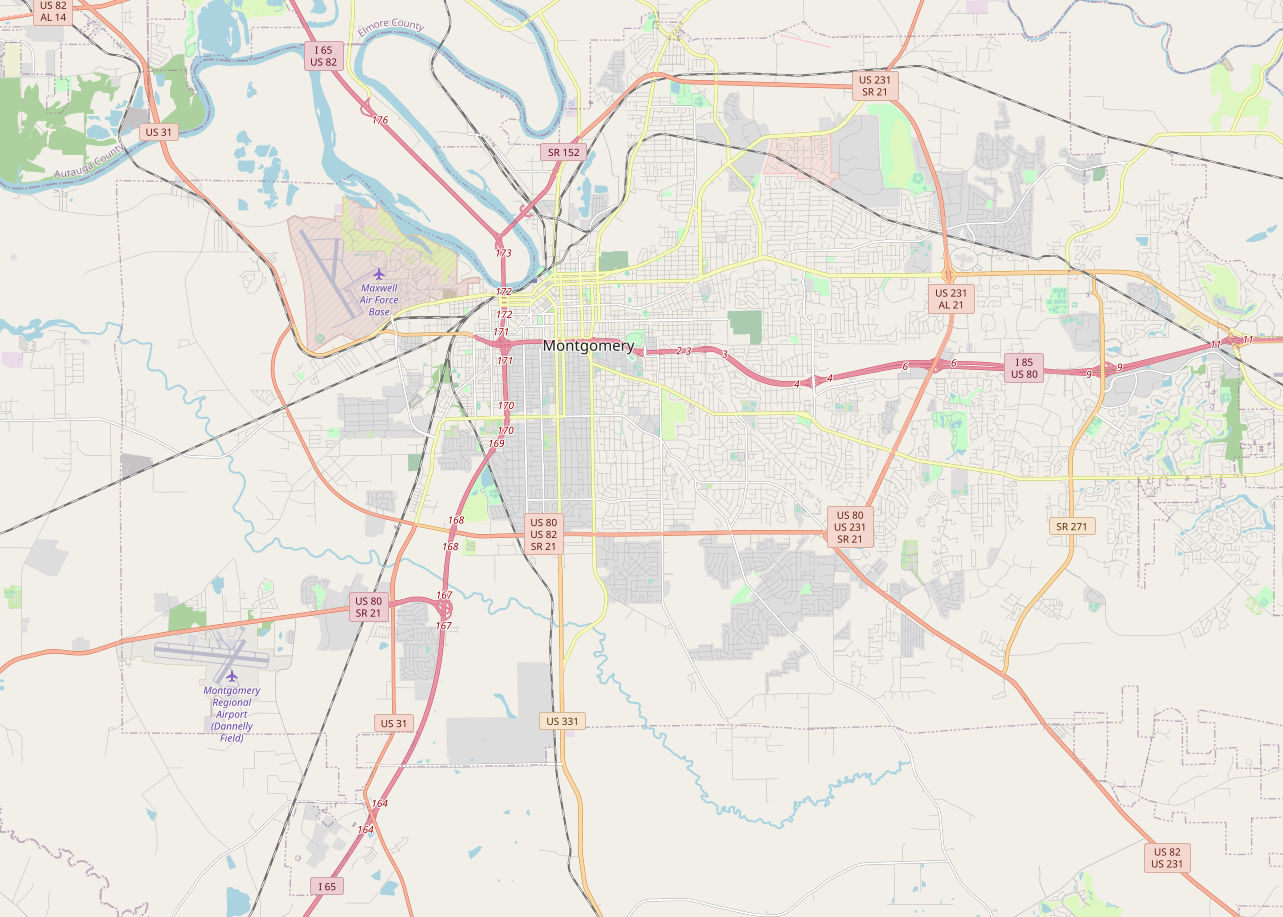
- Location within Montgomery, Alabama Location within Alabama Location within the United States
- Location: Montgomery, Alabama
- Coordinates: 32°22′34″N 86°18′0″W
- Area: less than one acre
- Built: 1835
- Architectural style: Italianate
- NRHP reference No.: 74000432

Significant dates
- Added to NRHP: June 25, 1974
- Designated ARLH: August 14, 2012

The First White House of the Confederacy is a historic house in Montgomery, Alabama, which served as the initial executive residence of President of the Confederate States of America Jefferson Davis and family during early 1861. Moved from its original location in 1919 and completely furnished with original period pieces from the 1850s and 1860s, the 1835 Italianate-style house is open to the public. It has been listed on the National Register of Historic Places since 1974 and the Alabama Register of Landmarks and Heritage since 2012.

== Layout ==
The First White House of the Confederacy is a large two-story wooden frame house painted white and green. It has five bays across its frontal facade and four on either side. The main section of the house has a one-story wing extending from its rear, upon which two end-exterior chimneys are positioned. It is built on a foundation of brick piers and had a heavy bracketed cornice encircling the hipped roof. The cornice is unique because it has a ventilation system ornamented with a Liberty cap design. A similar cornice can be found upon the rear one-story wing but with a flower design instead of the Liberty Cap one. The exterior walls are weather-boarded. The house has a portico in the center of its facade supported by fluted columns and a balustrade. The wall was built with wooden planks in the portico area to simulate a stone texture. The central entrance is framed with two pilasters with side lights. A transom built with an architrave is placed above the door. The central stairhall has access to a double parlor, two bedrooms, and a back hallway. The parlors have simple wooden doorways and are connected by sliding doors. The bedrooms are designed similarly. The hallway ends in an archway built with Greek Revival doorways and an elaborate cornice design surrounding the roof of the doorway. The back hall, which intersected with the main hallway, has access to a side porch. The side porch is connected to the dining room through a hinged window that doubles as a door. The second floor has four bedrooms and what was most likely a nursery.

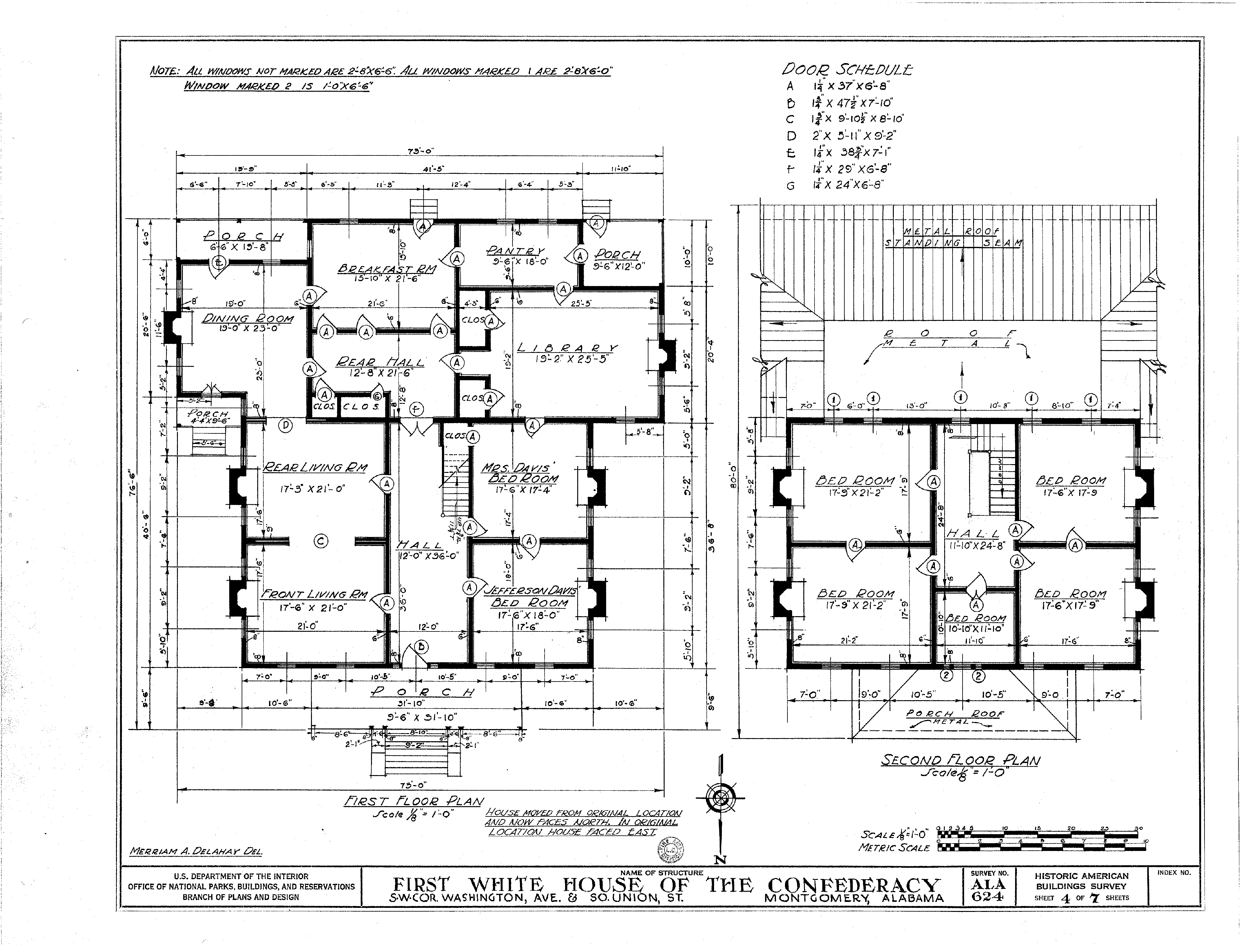
The floor plan of the First White House of the Confederacy

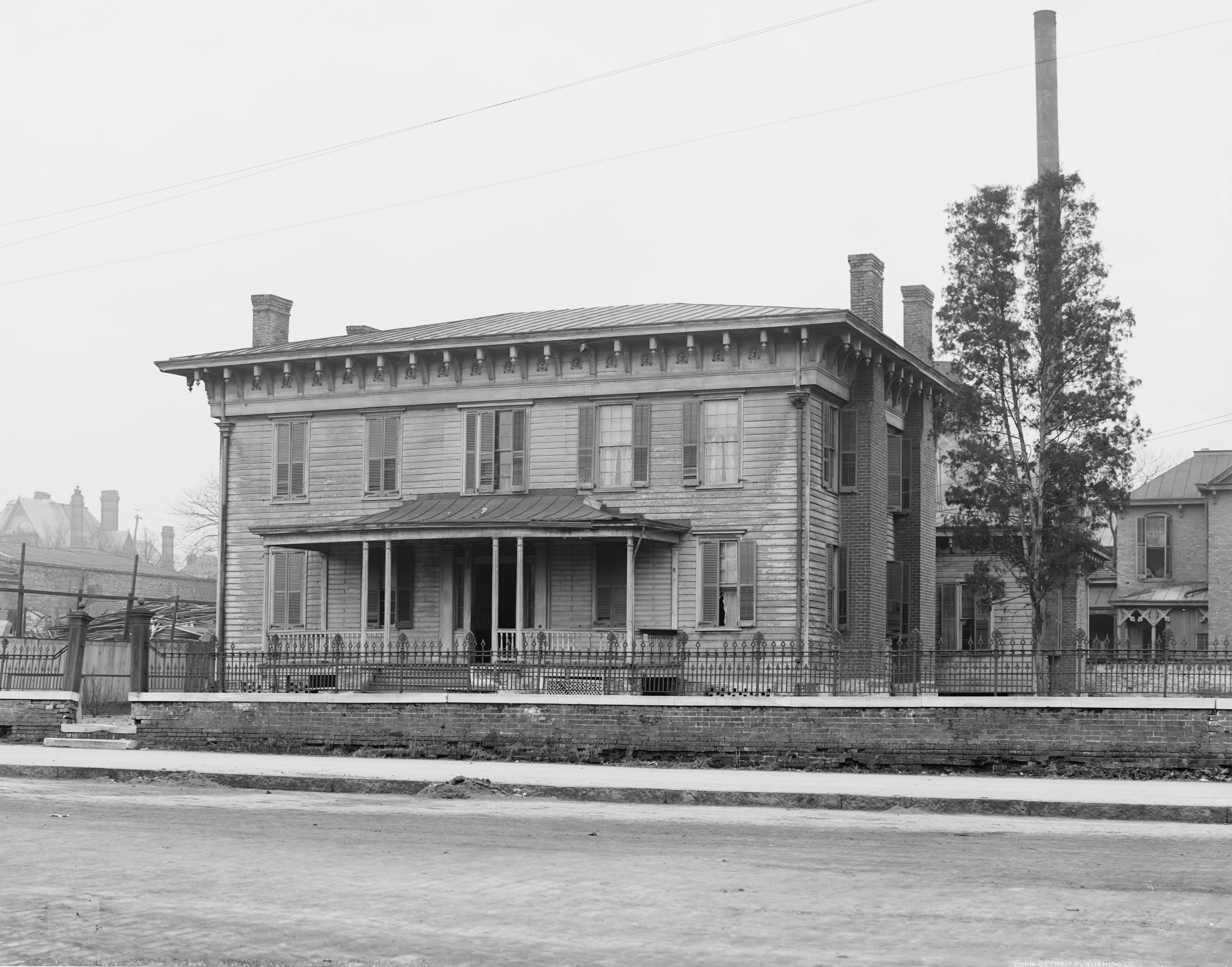
Photograph from 1906

== History ==
=== Construction and early history ===
The house is thought to have been built in 1832-5 by William Sayre, one of Montgomery's merchants, and was originally located at the corner of Bibb and Lee Streets in Montgomery. Afterward, the house went through a few different owners and was later purchased J. G. Winter, who remodeled it and sold it to Edmond Harrison of nearby Prattville, Alabama.

=== As executive mansion ===
In February 1861, shortly after selecting Davis as president, the Provisional Confederate Congress, meeting in Montgomery, authorized the leasing of an executive mansion. Harrison offered to rent the house fully furnished and staffed for $5,000 per year. After the Davises asked for extra furnishings of silver and linen, another $987 was added to the lease price. Additional furnishings were brought from the Davises' house in Biloxi, Mississippi. During the Davises' stay at this house, they threw many parties and entertainments. Varina Davis held the first of these for ladies of Montgomery. Records of the events say that they were both lavish and also well-managed.

In May 1861, the Confederacy moved its capital to Richmond, Virginia. The Davises vacated the Montgomery executive mansion on May 27, 1861, and moved to the Second White House of the Confederacy in Richmond. The Confederate government sold the lease on the house.

=== Move and restoration ===
After the American Civil War concluded, the house was passed on to William Crawford Gibb and then eventually to the Tyson family in 1871. The United Daughters of the Confederacy began planning to take it over, but progress was halting until the foundation of the White House Association of Alabama in 1900, which took over the project. The owner was unwilling to sell the land on which the house stood, and the organization did not have the funding to move it. By 1919, with the help of $25,000 from the Alabama Legislature, the White House Association bought the house and moved it to its present location at 644 Washington Street. By 1921, it was restored on Washington Street.

=== Current status ===
As of 2023, the house is open to the public. It has been listed on the National Register of Historic Places since 1974 and the Alabama Register of Landmarks and Heritage since 2012.

Alabama taxpayers subsidize the First White House of the Confederacy with $100,000 per year, leading to criticism in 2017 from various groups and individuals, including Alabama State Senator Hank Sanders, who took issue with the house's presentation of the history of Alabama and the ideology of the Lost Cause of the Confederacy through the displays and materials in the house; slavery as an issue leading to the American Civil War seemed to play no part in the historical presentation in the house.
