= J. Morgan Kousser =

American historian (born 1943)

- Born: October 7, 1943 (age 82); Lewisburg, Tennessee, U.S.
- Education: Princeton University (BA); Yale University (PhD)
- Occupation: Academic
- Employer: California Institute of Technology

Joseph Morgan Kousser (born October 7, 1943) is an American history and social sciences professor at the California Institute of Technology. He has written about discrimination against African Americans.

== Early life and education ==
Kousser was born on October 7, 1943, in Lewisburg, Tennessee. He graduated from Princeton University with an A.B. in history in 1965 after completing a senior thesis titled "Tennessee Politics and the Negro, 1948-1964." He then received a Ph.D. in political science from Yale University in 1971 after completing a 492-page long doctoral dissertation titled "The Shaping of Southern Politics: Suffrage Restriction and the Establishment of the One-Party South, 1880-1910" under the supervision of C. Vann Woodward.

== Career ==
Kousser joined the California Institute of Technology in 1971, where he is professor of history and social sciences. He was a visiting professor at Harvard University in 1981, and he was the Harold Vyvyan Harmsworth Professor of American History at Oxford University from 1984 to 1985. One of Kousser's primary fields of expertise is the current and historical interaction of race and voting rights in the United States. He has served as an expert witness in over thirty-five federal or state voting rights cases, including Garza v. County of Los Angeles (1990), United States v. Memphis (1991), Shaw v. Hunt (1994), Cano v. Davis (2002) and Perry v. Perez (2012).

Kousser was the editor of the journal Historical Methods from 2000 to 2013. He is the author of The Shaping of Southern Politics: Suffrage Restriction and the Establishment of the One-Party South, 1880-1910 (1974), and Colorblind Injustice: Minority Voting Rights and the Undoing of the Second Reconstruction (1999).

== Works ==
- Do the Facts of Voting Rights Support Chief Justice Roberts's Opinion in Shelby County? (October 1, 2014) read online
- Colorblind Injustice: Minority Voting Rights and the Undoing of the Second Reconstruction (University of North Carolina Press, 1999). read online
- How to Determine Intent: Lessons from L.A. (1990) read online
- Dead End: The Development of Litigation on Racial Discrimination in Schools in 19th Century America (Fair Lawn, N.J.: Oxford University Press, 1986). (The Development of Nineteenth-century Litigation on Racial Discrimination in Schools: an Inaugural Lecture Delivered Before the University of Oxford on 28 February 1985) read online
- Region, Race, and Reconstruction: Essays in Honor of C. Vann Woodward (New York: Oxford University Press, 1982), co-edited with James M. McPherson. read online
- The Shaping of Southern Politics: Suffrage Restriction and the Establishment of the One-Party South, 1880-1910 (Yale University Press, 1974; Paperback, 1976). Amazon.com

== See also ==
- Voting rights in the United States
- National Voting Rights Act of 1965
- Disfranchisement
- Disfranchisement after the American Civil War
- Race in the United States
