= Frances Scott Fitzgerald =

American journalist (1921–1986)

- Fitzgerald shows her children paper dolls that her mother, Zelda, made for her. From the February 1959 Life Magazine issue by Robert Phillips.
- Born: Frances Scott Fitzgerald; October 26, 1921; Saint Paul, Minnesota, U.S.
- Died: June 18, 1986 (aged 64); Montgomery, Alabama, U.S.
- Resting place: St. Mary's Catholic Cemetery, Rockville, Maryland
- Education: Vassar College
- Occupations: Writer, journalist
- Spouses: Jack Lanahan (m. 1943; div. 1967) Clinton Grove Smith (m. 1967; div. 1979)
- Children: 4
- Parents: F. Scott Fitzgerald (father); Zelda Sayre (mother)
- Relatives: Anthony D. Sayre (grandfather)

Frances Scott "Scottie" Fitzgerald (October 26, 1921 – June 18, 1986) was an American writer and journalist and the only child of novelist F. Scott Fitzgerald and Zelda Sayre Fitzgerald. She graduated from Vassar College and worked for The Washington Post, The New Yorker, and other publications. She became a prominent member of the Democratic Party.

In her later years, Fitzgerald became a critic of biographers' depictions of her parents and their marriage. She particularly objected to biographies that depicted her father as a domineering husband who drove his wife insane. Towards the end of her life, Scottie wrote a final coda about her parents to a biographer: "I have never been able to buy the notion that it was my father's drinking which led her to the sanitarium. Nor do I think she led him to the drinking."

Fitzgerald died from throat cancer at her Montgomery home in 1986, aged 64. She was posthumously inducted into the Alabama Women's Hall of Fame in 1992.

== Early life and family ==
Frances Scott Fitzgerald was born on October 26, 1921, in Saint Paul, Minnesota. As her mother Zelda Fitzgerald emerged from the anesthesia, her husband Scott recorded Zelda saying, "Oh, God, goofo [sic] I'm drunk. Mark Twain. Isn't she smart—she has the hiccups. I hope it's beautiful and a fool—a beautiful little fool." F. Scott Fitzgerald later used some of Zelda's rambling almost verbatim for Daisy Buchanan's dialogue in The Great Gatsby.

Nicknamed "Scottie", she spent her childhood moving from place to place with her parents including time in Paris and Antibes in France, and five years' residence in a beach house her father rented on the edge of Chesapeake Bay not far from Baltimore, Maryland. She attended Calvert School and briefly attended the Bryn Mawr School while her mother Zelda received treatment at Sheppard Pratt Hospital. Regarding her parents' behavior during her childhood, Scottie remarked:

"They were always very circumspect around me. I was unaware of all the drinking that was going on. I was very well taken care of and I was never neglected. I didn't consider it a difficult childhood at all. In fact, it was a wonderful childhood."

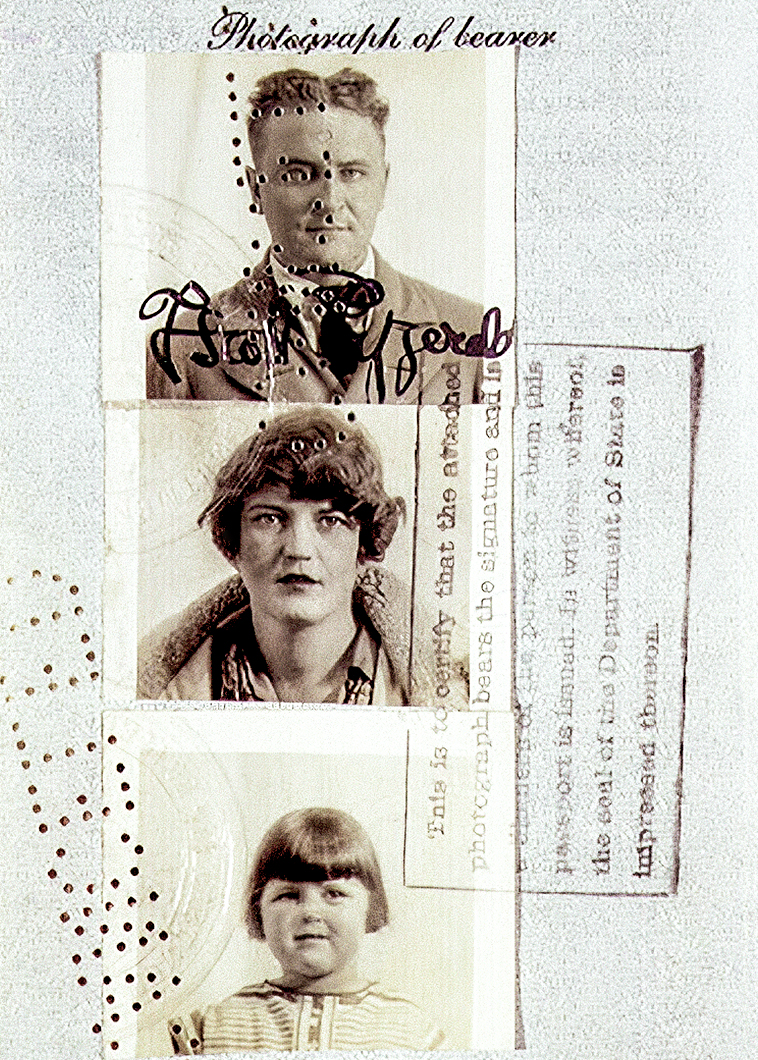
"Scottie" pictured with her parents, F. Scott Fitzgerald and Zelda, in their passport book for their trip to Europe in 1924.

In September 1936, fifteen-year-old Fitzgerald began attending the Ethel Walker School, a fashionable boarding school in Simsbury, Connecticut. The tuition was $2,200 a year, but her father arranged for a reduction. From this time on, Fitzgerald's agent Harold Ober and his wife Anne Ober became her surrogate parents. The Obers visited her at school, and she stayed with them in Scarsdale during holidays. On September 4, 1938, Anne Ober wrote to Scottie's father F. Scott Fitzgerald about her deep maternal relationship with his daughter:

"I know you think Harold and I spoil her, but so far Scottie trusts me and I think I have at least part of her confidence. It is an important relationship to me and while she may not realize it, I think it is to Scottie too."

Soon after, Scottie was expelled for sneaking away from campus in order to hitchhike to Yale to meet a romantic interest. In September 1938, she entered Vassar College. Hoping that she would not repeat his academic failures, her father wrote letters to her urging her to study hard. These letters of advice were later collected as Letters to His Daughter.

Seventeen months before her graduation, her father F. Scott Fitzgerald died of a heart attack due to occlusive coronary arteriosclerosis at 44 years old. On learning of her father's death, Scottie telephoned his mistress Sheilah Graham from Vassar and asked that she not attend the funeral for the sake of social propriety. On her part, Scottie insisted that she always viewed Sheilah Graham with affection:

"I didn't resent her being with him. Why should I? I thought it was marvelous that he had somebody to look after him, somebody whose company he enjoyed. She was immensely loyal and devoted, obviously adored him, and I was naturally happy for him. Without her, I can't imagine how he would have survived Hollywood—Hollywood let him down so."

== Marriage and career ==
After her graduation from Vassar in June 1942, Scottie worked as a publicist for Radio City Music Hall and as a researcher for Time magazine. During World War II, she contributed to the Talk of the Town section of The New Yorker, wrote nightclub reviews, and also published her first piece of fiction there, titled The Stocking Present. She also wrote for a number of other magazines.

In February 1943, amid World War II, Scottie married Lieutenant Samuel Jackson "Jack" Lanahan in New York. Lanahan was a Princeton University alumnus from Baltimore, Maryland, whom she had begun dating prior to her father's death while she was at Vassar. It was a hasty wartime wedding with Scottie wearing a long white gown that Mrs. Harold Ober—who had been a sort of foster mother to Scottie during her mother Zelda's recurrent institutionalization—bought for her the day before the ceremony. Her mother, Zelda, did not attend the wedding. Shortly after their marriage, Lanahan left Scottie for overseas duty.

After the war, her husband Jack Lanahan became a prominent Washington lawyer, and the couple were popular hosts in Washington society in the 1950s and 1960s. During this period, she wrote and directed musical comedies about the Washington social scene that were performed annually to benefit the Multiple Sclerosis Society of Washington. Her show Onward and Upward with the Arts was considered for a Broadway run by producer David Merrick.

During their marriage, Scottie and Jack had four children: Thomas Addison "Tim" Lanahan (who died by suicide at the age of 27 in 1973); Eleanor Anne Lanahan; Samuel Jackson Lanahan, Jr, and Cecilia Scott Lanahan.

== Later life and political activities ==
In 1953, she joined the staff of The Democratic Digest, published by the Democratic National Committee. She became a writer for Democratic Governor Adlai E. Stevenson when he ran against President Dwight Eisenhower in 1956. That year she became a political columnist for The Northern Virginia Sun. In 1967, she divorced her husband and married Clinton Grover Smith.

In her later years, Fitzgerald criticized biographers' depictions of her parents' marriage. In the wake of Nancy Milford's biography of her mother, partisan scholars of Zelda frequently depicted Scott Fitzgerald as a domineering husband who drove his wife insane. In response to this historical revisionism, Zelda's daughter Scottie Fitzgerald wrote an essay dispelling such inaccurate interpretations. She particularly objected to revisionist depictions of her mother as "the classic 'put down' wife, whose efforts to express her artistic nature were thwarted by a typically male chauvinist husband". In contrast, Scottie insisted:

"My father greatly appreciated and encouraged his wife's unusual talents and ebullient imagination. Not only did he arrange for the first showing of her paintings in New York in 1934 he sat through long hours of rehearsals of her one play, Scandalabra, staged by a Little Theater group in Baltimore; he spent many hours editing the short stories she sold to College Humor and to Scribner's Magazine."

In the early 1890s [Zelda's father] Judge Anthony Sayre had introduced into the Alabama legislature the bill that had deprived the black people of Alabama... of the right to vote. The purpose of the Sayre Election Law... was to “maintain white supremacy, and to have a ticket selected where only white men will vote.' 'Scottie was really embarrassed by it'...

— Eleanor Lanahan, Scottie's daughter and Zelda's granddaughter, 1995

Towards the end of her life, Scottie wrote a final coda about her parents to a biographer: "I have never been able to buy the notion that it was my father's drinking which led her to the sanitarium. Nor do I think she led him to the drinking." During this period of her life, Scottie also collaborated with her news reporting colleague Winzola McLendon to research and write the 1970 book, Don't Quote Me: Washington Newswomen & the Power Society.

In 1973, when Fitzgerald was legally separated from husband Grover Smith, she moved from Washington, D.C. to her mother's hometown of Montgomery, Alabama. After her relocation to Montgomery, she researched the family's roots and was dismayed to discover her grandfather Anthony D. Sayre, an Alabama state legislator, had introduced a racist bill in 1893 that "deprived the black people of Alabama, and thousands of poor whites, of the right to vote." The purpose of the 1893 Sayre Election Law was to "maintain white supremacy, and to have a ticket selected where only white men will vote." Upon learning of this fact, Scottie felt both embarrassment and guilt and for the remainder of her life devoted herself to voter outreach programs in Alabama.

== Final years and death ==
Several months after Fitzgerald's relocation, she attended a party in Montgomery when she was informed via long-distance telephone call of her son's suicide. She made polite excuses about leaving the party without giving the other guests any indication as to what had happened.

Despite ill-health, Fitzgerald remained active in the state Democratic Party in Alabama, and she worked with Walter Mondale during his campaign trips to Montgomery over the years. During the twelve years that she lived in Montgomery before developing throat cancer, she traveled frequently to visit her three surviving children and grandchildren, none of whom lived near Alabama.

Fitzgerald died from throat cancer at her Montgomery home on June 18, 1986, aged 64. Shortly before she died, she told her three surviving children that she wished she had quit smoking cigarettes years earlier. She is buried next to her parents in Rockville, Maryland.
