= Mineral Mound State Park =

State park in Kentucky, United States

- Location within Kentucky Location within the United States
- Type: Kentucky state park
- Location: Lyon County, Kentucky
- Coordinates: 37°04′00″N 88°04′44″W
- Area: 541 acres (219 ha)
- Created: 2003
- Operator: Kentucky Department of Parks
- Status: Open year-round
- Website: Official website

Mineral Mound State Park is a park located on the shores of Lake Barkley in Lyon County, Kentucky, United States. The 541-acre (219 ha) park contains an 18-hole golf course with clubhouse, a boat ramp, fishing pier, and picnicking area. Mineral Mound is named after the mansion of Willis B. Machen, which formerly stood on the property.
