= Harold Ober =

American literary agent

Harold Ober (1881–1959) was an American literary agent.

In 1907 — two years after graduating from Harvard with a degree in literature — Harold Ober became a literary agent at the Paul R. Reynolds Literary Agency. By 1908 he was representing such authors as Jack London and H. G. Wells. In 1929, he opened his own agency, Harold Ober Associates, — representing authors such as F. Scott Fitzgerald, Agatha Christie, William Faulkner, Philip Wylie, Pearl Buck and Walter D. Edmonds and J. D. Salinger. Although abandoning his contract with the publishers Little, Brown, Inc., Salinger employed and entrusted Ober's agency until his death in 2010. Harold Ober died in 1959.
