= John Witherspoon DuBose =

American newspaper editor, historian and white supremacist (1836–1918)

John Witherspoon DuBose (March 5, 1836 – February 14, 1918) was a newspaper editor, historian, and author in Alabama. He was a strident white supremacist.

He was born in Society Hill, South Carolina in Darlington County, South Carolina and moved with his family to Marengo County in 1850. Kimbrough Cassels DuBose and Elizabeth Boykin (Witherspoon) DuBose were his parents. He never married. He attended South Carolina College.

He served in the Confederate Army with the Quartermaster Corps reaching the rank of Lieutenant Colonel. A cotton planter, he moved to Birmingham, owned a bookstore in Gadsden, Alabama, and worked as an assistant at the Alabama Department of Archives and History from 1901 to 1907 and from 1912 to 1917.

He wrote for Alabama Historical Society publications. He was killed when a freight train hit him.

The New York Public Library has a letter he wrote.

Librarian William Stanley Hoole, who became the head librarian at the University of Alabama, wrote about him and published a collection of his essays. Peter Alexander Brannon wrote My Memories of John Witherspoon DuBose.

== Writings ==
- Alabama's Tragic Decade: Ten Years of Alabama 1865-1874
- Jefferson County and Birmingham, Alabama: historical and biographical Southern Historical Press (1887)
- Life and Times of William Lowndes Yancey
- General Joe Wheeler and the Army of Tennessee
- Witherspoon DuBose; a Neglected Southern Historian (1983)
