= Thomas M. Owen =

American lawyer, author, and historian

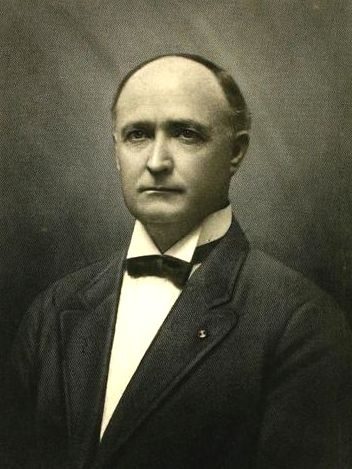
- Born: Thomas McAdory Owen; November 19, 1866; Jonesboro, Alabama, U.S.
- Died: March 25, 1920 (aged 53)
- Resting place: Montgomery, Alabama, U.S., at Greenwood Cemetery
- Education: University of Alabama
- Occupations: Historian, Professor of history, Civil Servant
- Spouse: Marie Bankhead Owen
- Children: Thomas McAdory Abernethy, John Hollis Bankhead Abernethy

Signature
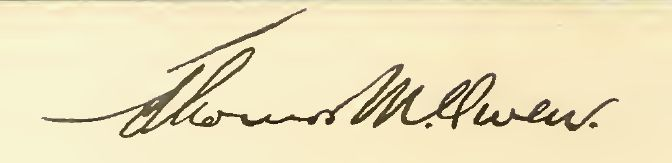

Thomas McAdory Owen (November 19, 1866 – March 25, 1920) was an American lawyer, archivist, historian, and founder of the Alabama Department of Archives and History, serving as its first director. Owen was the author of a large and noted four-volume work, History of Alabama and dictionary of Alabama biography, and numerous other historical works. Through his lobbying efforts Owen was instrumental at obtaining the needed support and state funding for the Alabama Historical Society and other archival and historical institutions in the state.

== Early life and education ==
Thomas Owen was born on November 19, 1866, and was raised in Jonesboro, near what is now Bessemer, Alabama. He was the son of physician William Owen and Nancy McAdory Owen. He married Marie Bankhead, daughter of United States Senator John H. Bankhead, on April 12, 1893. They had two children, Thomas McAdory, born 1894, and John Hollis Bankhead, born 1895, who died when he was only five.

Owen graduated from the University of Alabama School of Law, in Tuscaloosa in 1887, and at age twenty-one he graduated with both a bachelor's and a law degree.

Owen was one of the founding members of the Alabama branch of the Sons of the Revolution in 1894 and served as its secretary.

== Career ==
Two months later Owen began his law practice in Bessemer. Soon after beginning his practice, Owen became heavily involved in local politics. By 1888 he was elected as Justice of the Peace. By 1890 he became chairman of the Democratic executive committee in Jefferson County. Two years later he became the county's Assistant County Solicitor. However, his legal career soon became second to his career as an archivist and historian.

In 1889, still active in politics, Owen began collecting student publications from his old alma mater. His interests soon broadened to encompass Alabama's entire history. In his efforts to document Alabama's history, he soon discovered that no one library possessed the sources he needed to write a thorough and in-depth historical account. He soon realized that he had to begin collecting and amassing his own archival collection, and began doing so by accumulating old maps, newspapers, pamphlets, correspondence, diaries, scrapbooks, and various county histories. His almost full-time involvement of history took up a great amount of his time, subsequently compromising his legal practice, which in turn led to financial troubles for his family.

Needing to remedy his financial situation, Owen appealed to his father-in-law, John H. Bankhead, a Senator from Alabama, hoping the Senator could help him procure a government position in Washington, D.C. Owen arrived in the capital on September 1, 1894, and devoted all his spare time conducting research in the Library of Congress and the many other historical resources available in Washington. He continued his efforts in building his personal collection of historical materials, amassing information that he used in bibliographies on Alabama and Mississippi history. The two bibliographies were published by the American Historical Association in 1897 and 1899, respectively, and earned Owen a national reputation as a historian.

In 1898, with help from a few others, Owen revived the dormant Alabama Historical Society. After assuming the position of secretary of the society, Owen wrote and submitted two bills to the state legislature, calling for the creation of a commission to research and preserve Alabama's historical past. Two days later the Bills were unanimously passed by the Senate.

Owen founded the Alabama Department of Archives and History (ADAH) in 1901, in Montgomery; it was the nation's first publicly funded, independent state archives agency. Owen was an enthusiastic lobbyist who persistently lobbied the governor and legislators for needed funding and support. Under Owen's supervision, the ADAH greatly increased its collection of manuscripts, documents, maps and artifacts, with focus on Civil War era collections. Much of the collection of archives and artifacts were from the nineteenth and early twentieth centuries and were procured under Owen's tenure. He was particularly earnest in his search for Civil War documents and artifacts from his home state. In one instance he located a Confederate flag in Madison, Wisconsin, belonging to the Perote Guards of Alabama, that was captured by Union soldiers in April 1862.

The Department of Archives became a distinct department of the state government. Its headquarters were within the State capitol building, and under the control of a board of nine trustees, with powers and duties that were supervisory, where they would conduct annual meetings to discuss business and review the agency's involvements during the preceding year. Owen became the agency's first director and was bound by a specific set of laws as put forth in Laws governing the Department of Archives and History, first published in 1907:

"The immediate management and control is vested in a Director, who is elected by the board for a term of six years. He is qualified and commissioned as other State officers. He is as completely and fully in control of the work of his office as any other official in the State employ."

When Owen died in 1920, the ADAH board of trustees appointed his wife, Marie Bankhead Owen, as the agency's new director, who served in that capacity for the following thirty-five years. Owen had nearly completed a large four volume work, entitled, History of Alabama and dictionary of Alabama biography, the first comprehensive study of Alabama's notable people and history, which was published and copyrighted by his wife, Marie Bankhead Owen, in 1921, the year after Thomas died. He had dedicated the work to his father, William Marmaduke Owen, and his father-in-law, John Hollis Bankhead.

== Final days ==
Owen's career was cut short when he prematurely died on March 25, 1920, at the age of 53, just before he completed his four volume, History of Alabama and dictionary of Alabama biography. His wife, friends and assistants wondered if his work would be completed and published. Owen's wife, Marie, with the help of Thomas' friends and associates, saw that the work was completed and published. In the Preface of volume one, Marie paid tribute and thanks to all who had helped in completion and publication of Thomas Owen's work. Thomas Owen was buried in Montgomery, Alabama, at Greenwood Cemetery.

== Works by Owen ==
- Owen, Thomas McAdory (1921). History of Alabama and dictionary of Alabama biography. Vol. 1. Chicago: The S. J. Clarke publishing company.
  - —— Vol 2
  - —— Vol 3
  - —— Vol 4
- —— (1898). A bibliography of Alabama. U.S. Government Printing Office.
- —— (1900). A bibliography of Mississippi. U.S. Government Printing Office.

== See also ==
- History of Alabama
- Charles Henry Ambler - specialized in frontier history, and a contemporary of Owen
- Thomas Perkins Abernethy - a contemporary of Owen who also specialized in Alabama history

== Sources ==
- Monroe, Alden (2003). "Thomas Owen and the Founding of the Alabama Department of Archives and History". Provenance, Journal of the Society of Georgia Archivists. 21 (1). Alabama Department of Archives and History.
- Monroe, Alden N. (2007). "Thomas M. Owen". The Encyclopedia of Alabama; Auburn University.
- Hébert, Rebecca Lapczynski (2009). "Alabama Department of Archives and History". The Encyclopedia of Alabama; Auburn University.
- Owen, Thomas M. (1921). History of Alabama and dictionary of Alabama biography, Vol 1. Chicago, The S. J. Clarke publishing company.
  Vol 2 — Vol 3 — Vol 4
- Alabama State Senate, Owen, Thomas M., Director (1907). Laws governing the Department of Archives and History. Montgomery, Alabama: Brown Printing Company.
- Hoole, W. Stanley; McMillan, James B., eds. (1948). The Alabama Review, Volumes 1-2. University of Alabama Press for Alabama Historical Association.
