= 1st Alabama Cavalry Regiment =

1st Alabama Cavalry Regiment may refer to:

- 1st Alabama Cavalry Regiment (Confederate)
- 1st Alabama Cavalry Regiment (Union)

== See also ==
- 1st Alabama Infantry Regiment, a Confederate regiment
