= Perote, Alabama =

Unincorporated community in Alabama, United States

- Unincorporated community
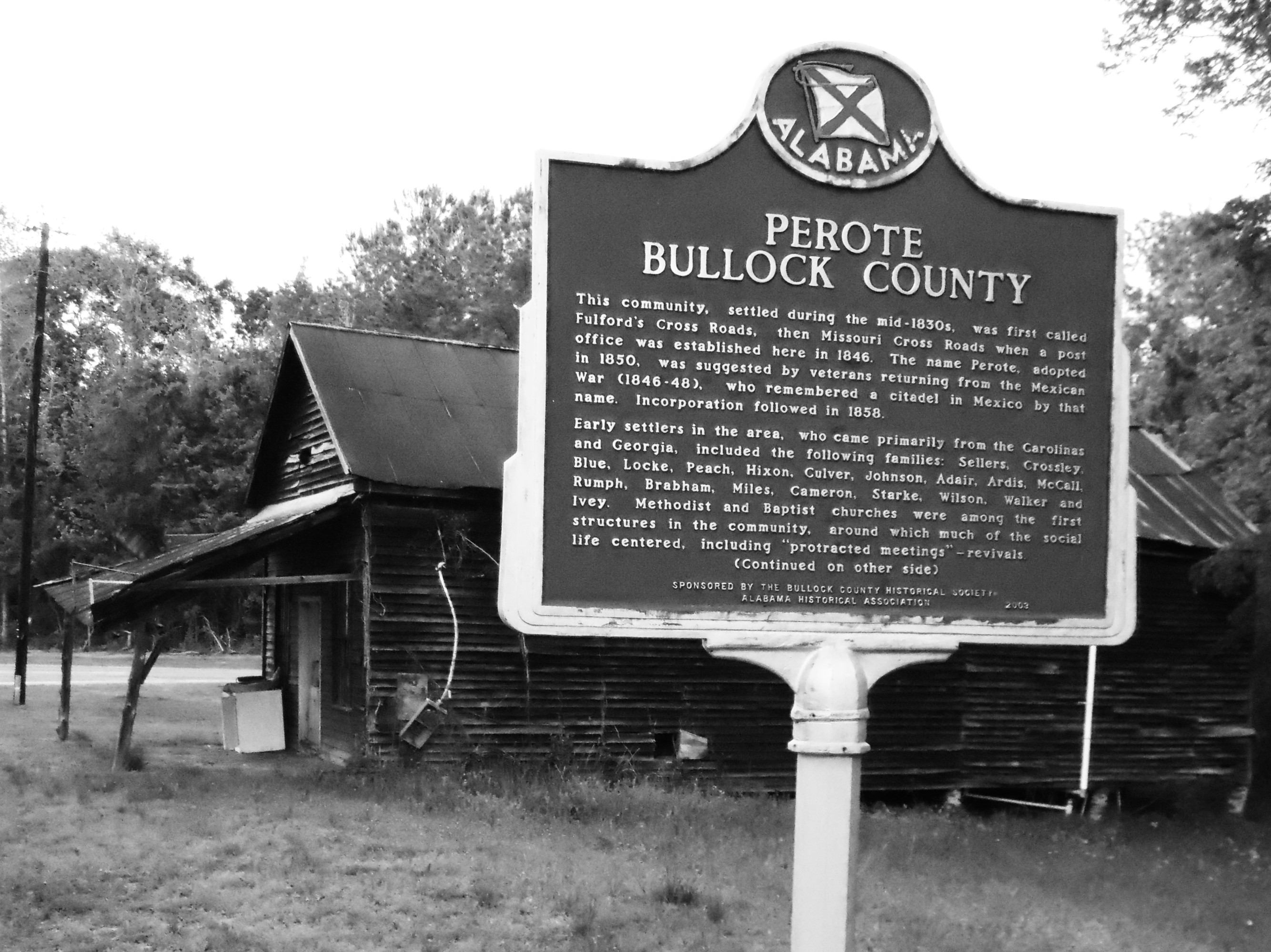
- The Historic Marker at Perote

- Location within Alabama Location within the United States
- Coordinates: 31°56′52″N 85°42′19″W
- Country: United States
- State: Alabama
- County: Bullock
- Elevation: 482 ft (147 m)
- Time zone: UTC-6 (Central (CST))
  - Summer (DST): UTC-5 (CDT)
- ZIP code: 36061
- Area code: 334
- GNIS feature ID: 152872

Perote is an unincorporated community in Bullock County, Alabama, United States.

== History ==
=== Text from historical marker ===
==== Obverse ====
"Perote, Bullock County"

"This community, settled during the mid-1830s, was first called Fulford's Cross Roads, then Missouri Cross Roads when a post office was established here in 1846. The name Perote, adopted in 1850, was suggested by veterans returning from the Mexican War (1846–48), who remembered a citadel in Mexico by that name. Incorporation followed in 1858. Early settlers in the area, who came primarily from the Carolinas and Georgia, included the following families: Boykin, Reeves, Sellers, Crossley, Blue, Harp, Locke, Peach, Hixon, Culver, Johnson, Adair, Ardis, McCall, Rumph, Brabham, Miles, Cameron, Starke, Wilson, Walker and Ivey. Methodist and Baptist churches were among the first structures in the community, around which much of the social life centered, including "protracted meetings" – revivals."

==== Reverse ====
"Perote, Bullock County"

"Perote grew rapidly in the 1850s so that by 1860 the community was thriving with several doctors, stores, a carriage factory, a Masonic lodge, and a school. At the beginning of the American Civil War (1861–65), the school numbered about 150 students. Many of the young men from the school served in the Perote Guards, organized in 1859 as war clouds gathered. They went off to war as part of the 1st Alabama Infantry Regiment with uniforms and a flag handmade by the women they left behind.

The community's fortunes fell following the war as cotton cultivation, the area's traditional leading economic pursuit, receded in importance. By-passed by the railroad and experiencing several disastrous fires, Perote suffered a steady decline in business activity and population."

== Demographics ==
Historical population
Census	Pop.	Note	%±
1880	245		—
1920	134		—
1930	143		6.7%
U.S. Decennial Census

== See also ==
- The Mexican city of Perote, Veracruz, for which Perote, Alabama, was named.
