= Nathan Glick =

American artist and illustrator

Nathan H. Glick (June 10, 1912 – October 16, 2012) was an American artist and illustrator best known for his work as a combat artist depicting aerial battles in World War II. He also worked as art director for Progressive Farmer magazine, and as the illustrator of several books on early Alabama history.

Glick was born in Leeds, Alabama in 1912 but finished high school in Montgomery. He continued his art studies under Eric Pape and George Ennis in New York City and studied animal anatomy under James L. Clarke at the American Museum of Natural History.

During the 1930s, Glick was art director for Paragon Press, a small publisher which issued history works by Alabama state archivist Marie Bankhead Owen. She also commissioned him to design the scenes cast in bronze for the doors of Alabama's 1940 Alabama Department of Archives and History building.

During World War II, Glick was assigned as combat artist for the Ninth Air Force. He created dramatic scenes of combat in the skies of North Africa, France, India and the South Pacific. The Air Force's public relations department distributed his drawings for publication in Yank, Stars and Stripes, The Illustrated London News, Life and Parade.

After the end of the war, Glick returned to Birmingham and took a job as art director and illustrator for Progressive Farmer, retiring in 1977. He continued to contribute illustrations of Alabama history to books and helped create a series of fourteen murals for the United States Forest Service's Forest Heritage Center in Broken Bow, Oklahoma. His drawings, lithographs and paintings are also sold through private galleries.

The "Nathan Glick Lifetime Achievement Award for Aviation Art" created by Birmingham's Southern Museum of Flight is named in his honor.
