= Carter Manasco =

American politician from Alabama

Member of the U.S. House of Representatives from Alabama's 7th district
- In office June 24, 1941 – January 3, 1949
- Preceded by: Walter W. Bankhead
- Succeeded by: Carl Elliott

Member of the Alabama House of Representatives from the ? district
- In office 1930–1934

Personal details
- Born: January 3, 1902 Townley, Alabama, U.S.
- Died: February 5, 1992 (aged 90) Arlington, Virginia, U.S
- Party: Democratic
- Education: Howard College; University of Alabama (LL.B.)

Carter Manasco (January 3, 1902 – February 5, 1992) was an American politician and attorney. A member of the Democratic Party, Manasco served as U.S. Representative from Alabama from 1941 to 1949. Following his congressional service, Manasco worked for the National Coal Association as its legislative counsel.

== Early life and career ==
Born in Townley, Alabama, Manasco attended the public schools and Howard College, Birmingham, Alabama. He graduated from the University of Alabama School of Law, LL.B., 1927 and J.D. 1929. He was admitted to the bar the same year and began practice in Jasper, Alabama. He served as member of the Alabama House of Representatives from 1930 to 1934. He served as secretary to Speaker William B. Bankhead, 1933–1940.

== U.S. House of Representatives ==
Manasco was elected as a Democrat to the Seventy-seventh Congress to fill the vacancy caused by the resignation of Walter W. Bankhead. He was reelected to the Seventy-eighth, Seventy-ninth, and Eightieth Congresses and served from June 24, 1941, to January 3, 1949. He served as chairman of the Committee on Expenditures in Executive Departments (Seventy-eighth and Seventy-ninth Congresses).

During the early part of the Second World War, he railed against the measures of agencies like the Office of Price Administration:

Recently the Office of Price Administration issued a regulation placing a ceiling on the ancient game of pool and on the new national pastime, bowling. Of course, it is very important to call to the attention of the American people that their sons and brothers are dying in the Solomons, by placing a ceiling on these all-American pastimes.

— Congressional Record via Carbon County News

He was an unsuccessful candidate for renomination in 1948.

== Later life and career ==
He resumed the practice of law and engaged in public relations work. He served as member of the first Hoover Commission on Reorganization of the Executive Departments from 1947 to 1949. He was legislative counsel for the National Coal Association from 1949 to 1985.

He was a resident of McLean, Virginia, until his death in Arlington, Virginia, on February 5, 1992.

== See also ==
- "President Truman with Hoover Commission members | Harry S. Truman". www.trumanlibrary.gov.
- "President Truman presenting pens | Harry S. Truman". www.trumanlibrary.gov.

U.S. House of Representatives
Preceded by Walter W. Bankhead	Member of the U.S. House of Representatives from Alabama's 7th congressional district June 24, 1941–January 3, 1949	Succeeded by Carl Elliott
