= Moscow, Alabama =

Moscow is the name of two unincorporated communities in the US state of Alabama:

- Moscow, Lamar County, Alabama
- Moscow, Marengo County, Alabama
