= John T. Morgan =

American politician (1824–1907)

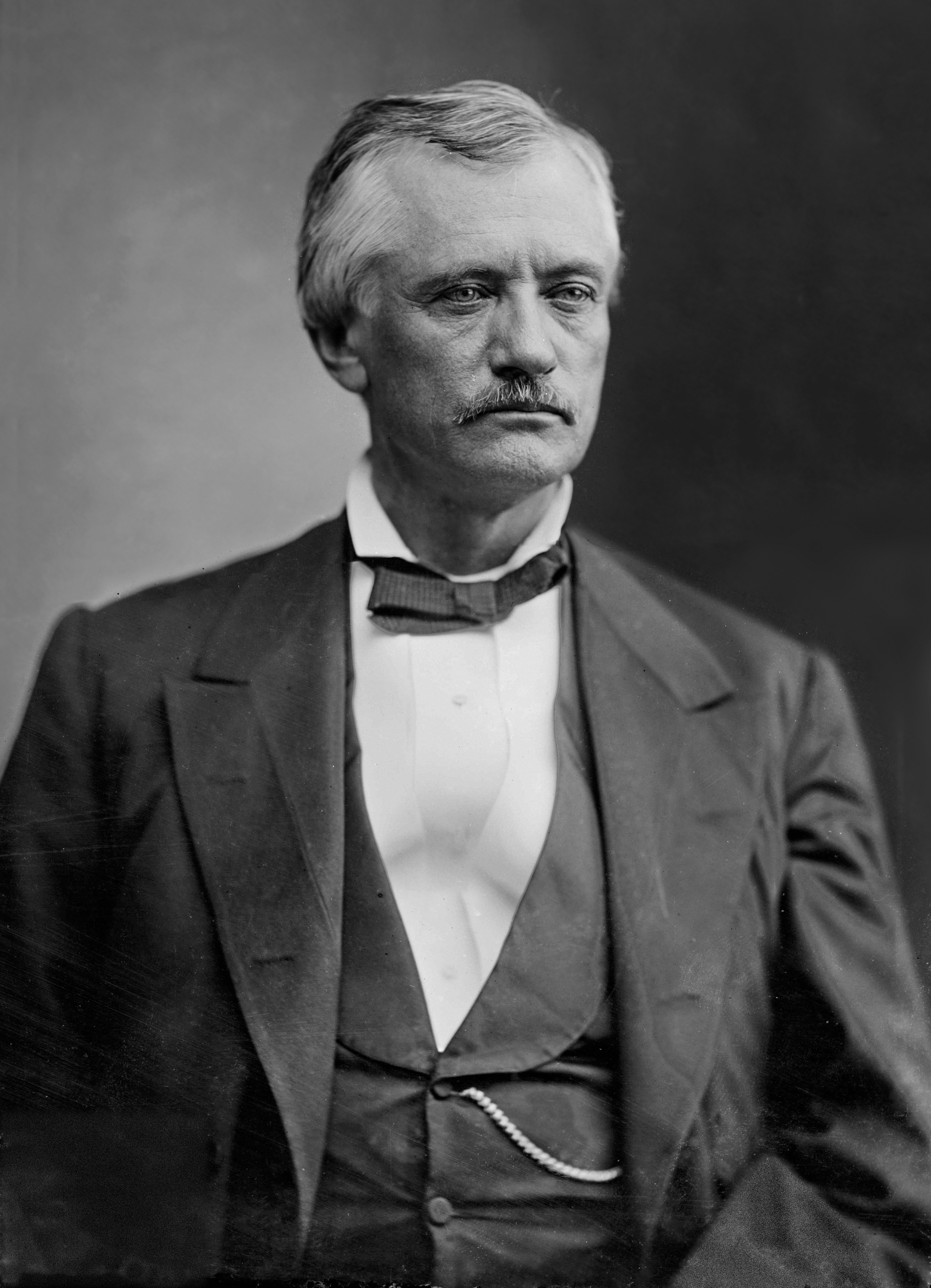
- Morgan in 1877

United States Senator from Alabama
- In office March 4, 1877 – June 11, 1907
- Preceded by: George Goldthwaite
- Succeeded by: John H. Bankhead

Personal details
- Born: John Tyler Morgan; June 20, 1824 Athens, Tennessee, U.S.
- Died: June 11, 1907 (aged 82) Washington, D.C., U.S.
- Party: Democratic

Military service
- Allegiance: Confederate States of America
- Branch/service: Confederate States Army
- Years of service: 1861–1865
- Rank: Brigadier-General
- Battles/wars: American Civil War

John Tyler Morgan (June 20, 1824 – June 11, 1907) was an American politician who was a brigadier general in the Confederate States Army during the American Civil War and later was elected for six terms as the U.S. senator (1877–1907) from the state of Alabama. A prominent slaveholder before the Civil War, he became the second Grand Dragon of the Ku Klux Klan in Alabama during the Reconstruction era. Morgan and fellow Klan member Edmund W. Pettus became the ringleaders of white supremacy in Alabama and did more than anyone else in the state to overthrow Reconstruction efforts in the wake of the Civil War. When President Ulysses S. Grant dispatched U.S. Attorney General Amos Akerman to prosecute the Klan under the Enforcement Acts, Morgan was arrested and jailed.

Due to his notoriety in Alabama for opposing Reconstruction efforts, Morgan was elected as a U.S. Senator in 1876. During his subsequent six terms as Senator, he was an outspoken proponent of black disfranchisement, racial segregation, and lynching African-Americans. According to historians, he played a leading role "in forging the ideology of white supremacy that dominated American race relations from the 1890s to the 1960s." Widely considered to be among the most notorious racist ideologues of his time, he is often credited by scholars with laying the foundation of the Jim Crow era.

In addition to his lifelong efforts to uphold white supremacy, Morgan became an ardent expansionist and imperialist during the Gilded Age. He envisioned the United States as a globe-spanning empire and believed that island nations such as Hawaii and the Philippines should be forcibly annexed for the country to dominate trade in the Pacific Ocean. He advocated for the United States to annex the independent Republic of Hawaii and to construct an inter-oceanic canal in Central America. Due to this advocacy, he was often posthumously referred to as "the Father of the Panama Canal" despite being a proponent of the Canal to be located in Nicaragua. Morgan was a staunch opponent of women's suffrage.

After his death by heart attack in 1907, Morgan's numerous relatives remained influential in Alabama politics and high society for many decades. His nephew, Anthony D. Sayre, was President of the Alabama State Senate and an Associate Justice of the Supreme Court of Alabama. As a white supremacist, Sayre served as the legal architect who laid the foundation for the state's Jim Crow laws, and his landmark 1893 Sayre Act disenfranchised black Alabamians for seventy years. Morgan's grand-niece was socialite Zelda Sayre, the neo-Confederate wife of novelist F. Scott Fitzgerald. Later in life, Zelda's views evolved from neo-Confederate beliefs toward an espousal of fascism.

== Early life and career ==
John Tyler Morgan was born in a log cabin one mile from Athens, Tennessee. His family claimed descent from a Welsh ancestor, James B. Morgan (1607–1704), who settled in the Connecticut Colony. Morgan was initially educated by his mother but, in the fall of 1830, the six-year-old barefoot boy walked a quarter of a mile each day to attend Old Forest Hill Academy.

In 1833, his family moved to Calhoun County, Alabama, where he attended schools and then studied law in Tuskegee with justice William Parish Chilton, his brother-in-law. After admission to the Alabama bar, he established a practice in Talladega. Ten years later, Morgan moved to Dallas County and resumed the practice of law in Selma and Cahaba. By 1857, he had grown prosperous and owned over half-a-dozen slaves—including an entire family who served as his personal household servants.

=== Early political activity ===
The most fatal and scandalous declaration ever made by the late Federal Government against the people of the South... is contained in those acts of Congress which denounce the African Slave Trade as piracy — a declaration at once degrading to every slaveholder, and a living rebuke to the Federal Constitution.

— John Tyler Morgan, 1861 speech

Turning to politics, Morgan aligned himself with the pro-slavery Fire-Eaters led by fellow Alabama politician William Lowndes Yancey and became an ardent exponent of the Southern secession movement. He became a presidential elector on the Democratic ticket in 1860, and tentatively supported Southern Democrat John C. Breckinridge. Months later, he was a delegate from Dallas County to the Alabama constitutional convention of 1861, and he played a key role in passing the ordinance of secession.

Amid the fractious debates at the Alabama constitutional convention, a 36-year-old Morgan defended slavery—including the transatlantic slave trade—as a morally uplifting and Christian institution. As a proud slaveholder, he publicly declared his reasons for advocating Alabama's secession from the Union in a speech on January 25, 1861: "The Ordinance of Secession rests, in a great measure, upon our assertion of a right to enslave the African race, or, what amounts to the same thing, to hold them in slavery." At the close of this same speech in 1861, Morgan envisioned a future slave-holding territory spanning the Gulf of Mexico and the islands of the Caribbean.

== American Civil War ==
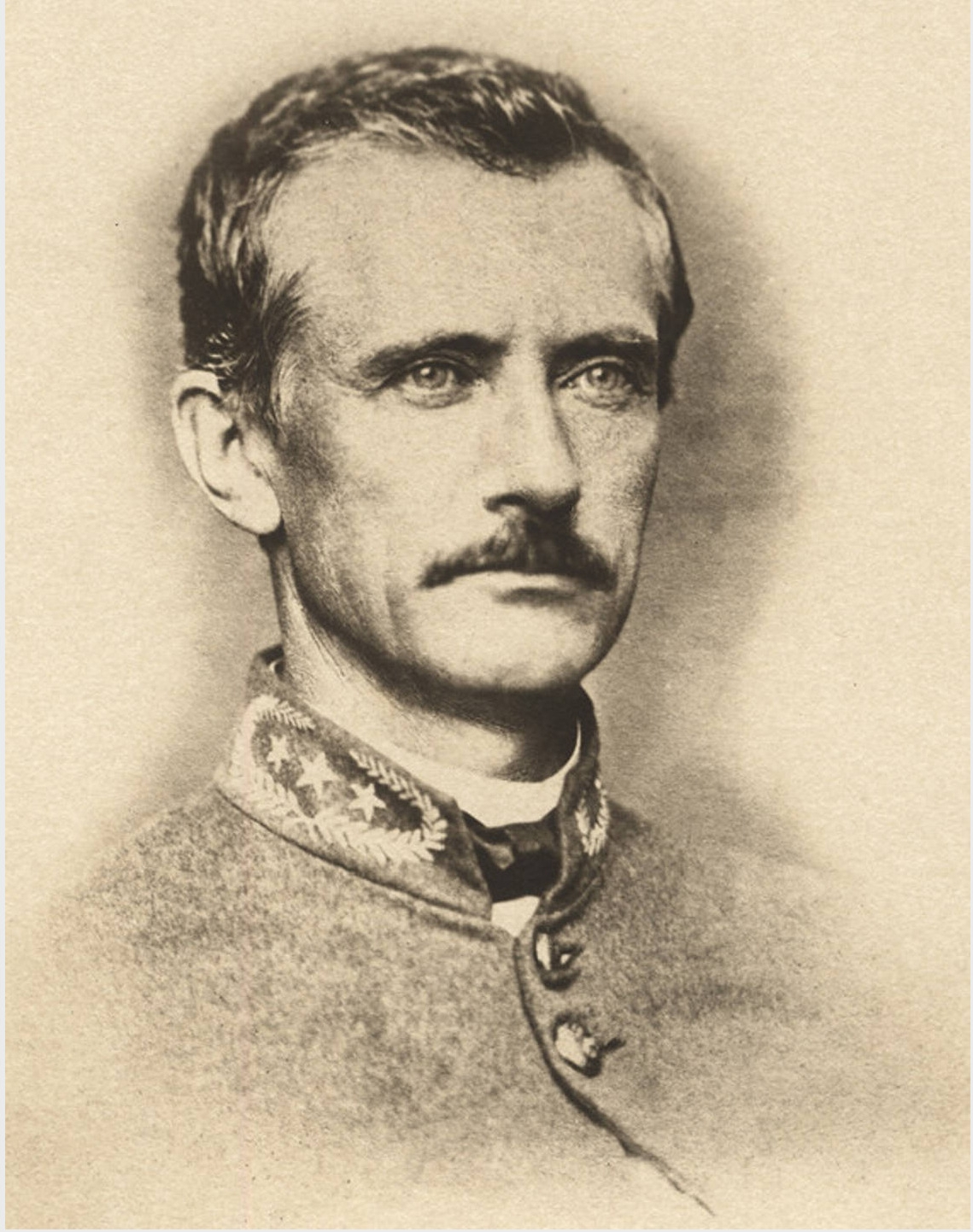
A studio portrait of Morgan taken circa 1860-1869

After Alabama seceded from the Union and the commencement of the Civil War, the 37-year-old Morgan enlisted as a private in the Cahaba Rifles, which volunteered its services in the Confederate Army and was assigned to the 5th Alabama Infantry. He first saw action in a skirmish preceding the First Battle of Manassas in the summer of 1861.

As the war progressed, Morgan rose to major and then lieutenant colonel. He served under Col. Robert E. Rodes, a future Confederate general. Morgan resigned his commission in 1862 and returned to Alabama, where in August he recruited a new regiment, the 51st Alabama Partisan Rangers, becoming its colonel. He led it at the Battle of Murfreesborough, operating in cooperation with the cavalry of Nathan Bedford Forrest.

When Rodes was promoted to major general in May 1863 and given a division in the Army of Northern Virginia, Morgan declined an offer to command Rodes's old brigade, and instead remained in the Western Theater, leading troops at the Battle of Chickamauga. On November 16, 1863, he was appointed as a brigadier general of cavalry and participated in the Knoxville Campaign. His brigade consisted of the 1st, 3rd, 4th, 9th, and 51st Alabama Cavalry regiments.

His men were routed and dispersed by Federal cavalry on January 27, 1864. He was reassigned to a new command and fought in the Atlanta campaign. Subsequently, his men harassed William T. Sherman's troops during the March to the Sea. Soon after, he was stripped of his command due to drunkenness and reassigned to administrative duty in Demopolis, Alabama. At the time of the Confederacy's collapse and the end of the war, Morgan attempted with little success to organize Alabama black troops for home defense.

== Reconstruction era ==
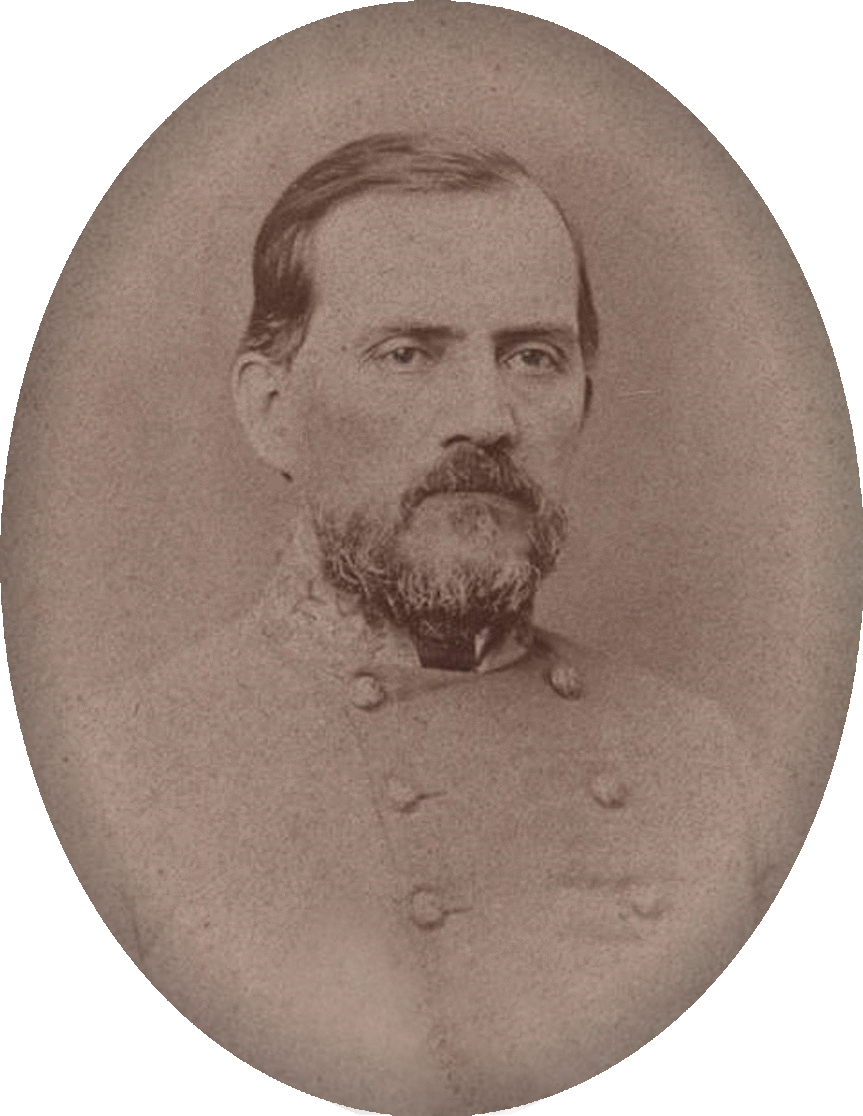
Morgan and fellow Klan leader Edmund Winston Pettus (pictured) played key roles in overturning Reconstruction efforts in postbellum Alabama.

After the war ended, Morgan resumed his law practice in Selma, Alabama. He became the affluent legal representative for the widely loathed railroad companies. By 1867, angered by formerly enslaved persons serving as state legislators, Morgan began to play a highly public role against the Republican Reconstruction.

Soon after, Morgan toured throughout the American South, giving race-baiting speeches and urging fellow Southerners to refuse all compromise with Reconstruction. Aligning himself with the Bourbon Democrats and employing their electoral strategy, Morgan wrote numerous newspaper editorials urging white Alabama voters to "redeem" their state from Republican control and to unite against African-Americans for "self-preservation."

Amid his political struggle against Reconstruction in 1872, Morgan succeeded James H. Clanton as the second Grand Dragon of the Ku Klux Klan in Alabama. According to Alabama Representative Robert Stell Heflin, Morgan and fellow Klan member Edmund W. Pettus became the ringleaders of white supremacy in the state who, more than anyone else, "resisted and finally broke down and destroyed the reconstruction policy which followed the Civil War."

When President Ulysses S. Grant dispatched his U.S. Attorney General Amos T. Akerman to vigorously prosecute the Alabama Klan under the Enforcement Acts, Morgan was arrested and jailed. After the demise of the first Ku Klux Klan, Morgan and Pettus continued to resist Reconstruction efforts and to reassert white supremacy in Alabama. Morgan took an active part in opposing all attempts to redress the political and socioeconomic legacies of slavery in Alabama.

Due to his efforts to suppress African-Americans from exercising their political rights and to vouchsafe white supremacy in Alabama during the Reconstruction era, Morgan became a well-known public figure in national politics and subsequently became a presidential elector-at-large on the Democratic Samuel J. Tilden ticket in 1876. Party insiders favored him to win Alabama's seat to the United States Senate in that year.

== Senatorship ==
[We had] to burn down the barn to get rid of the rats. The rats being the Negro population and the barn being the government of the District of Columbia.

— John Tyler Morgan, 1890 speech, praising the end of home rule in the District of Columbia

Following his election as U.S. Senator for the state of Alabama in 1876, Morgan was reelected five times in 1882, 1888, 1894, 1900, and 1906. He served as chairman of Committee on Rules (46th U.S. Congress), the Committee on Foreign Relations (53rd U.S. Congress), the Committee on Interoceanic Canals (56th and 57th Congresses), and the Committee on Public Health and National Quarantine (59th U.S. Congress).

He became Alabama's leading political spokesperson for nearly half a century. For much of his senatorial tenure, he remained aligned with the Bourbon Democrats, and he served in the Senate alongside his close friend Edmund W. Pettus, a former Confederate general and Klan member.

Throughout his senatorship, Morgan staunchly labored for the repeal of the Fifteenth Amendment to the U.S. Constitution, which was intended to prevent the denial of voting rights on the basis of race. He frequently urged the disenfranchisement of black citizens in every U.S. state, and he is accordingly credited by scholars with laying the foundation of the Jim Crow era. In a 1890 speech, Morgan declared that, when black residents entered any area, it became necessary to "deny the right of suffrage entirely to every human being." He likened such mass disenfranchisement to having "to burn down the barn to get rid of the rats."

Morgan opposed the passage of a woman suffrage amendment, arguing it would draw a "line of political demarcation through a man's household". He warned that women's suffrage would "open to the intrusion of politics and politicians that sacred circle of the family where no man should be permitted to intrude".

Due to his relentless efforts to disenfranchise black citizens across the United States and his vociferous championing of congressional legislation "to legalize the practice of racist vigilante murder [lynching] as a means of preserving white power in the Deep South," Morgan is frequently credited by historians with "forging the ideology of white supremacy that dominated American race relations from the 1890s to the 1960s."

=== Foreign policy ===
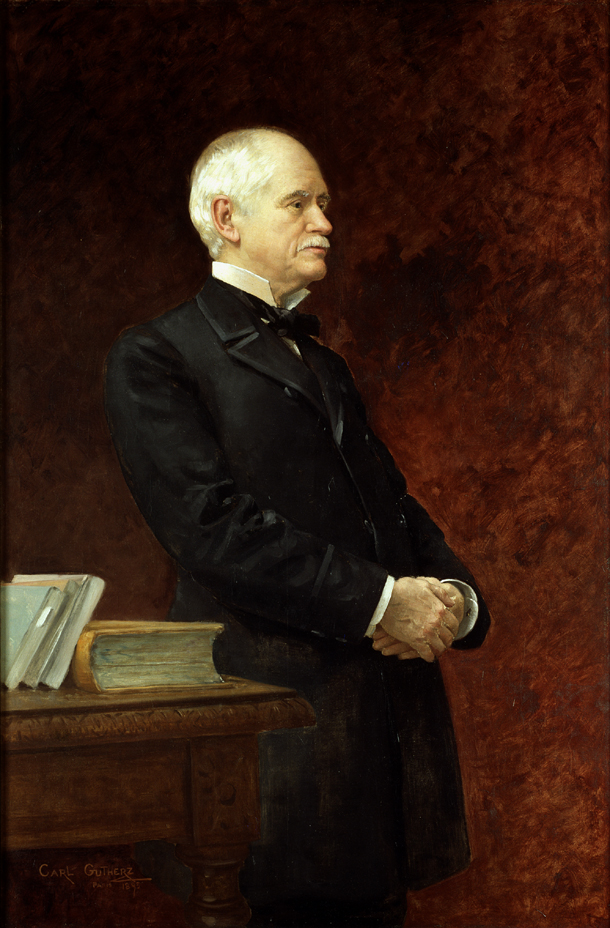
Morgan circa 1893

==== Black repatriation efforts ====
Morgan frequently advocated for the migration of black people to leave the United States. Historian Adam Hochschild notes that, "at various times in his long career Morgan also advocated sending them [negroes] to Hawaii, to Cuba, and to the Philippines—which, perhaps because the islands were so far away, he claimed were a 'native home of the negro.'"

By the 1880s, Morgan began to focus on the Congo for his repatriation visions. After the Belgian monarch Léopold II signaled that his International Association of the Congo would consider immigration and settlement of African Americans, Morgan became one of the foremost advocates of this emerging colonial enterprise in Central Africa. Morgan's support was vital for the United States' early diplomatic recognition of the new colony, which became the Congo Free State in December 1883.

After revelations about major atrocities by the colonial occupiers, Morgan cut his ties with the Congo Free State. He feared the brutality against the inherent African population would deter black U.S. citizens from emigrating and jeopardize his plans to create an exclusively white American nation. Hence, by 1903, Morgan became the most active U.S. congressional spokesperson for the Congo reform movement, a humanitarian pressure group that demanded reforms in the notorious Congo Free State.

The alliance between this pioneering international human rights movement and the radical white supremacist Morgan has often led to scholarly astonishment. However, the sociologist Felix Lösing pointed to the ideological nexus between the racial segregation promoted by Morgan and calls for cultural segregation raised by prominent Congo reformers. Both Morgan and the majority of the Congo reform movement were ultimately concerned with the consolidation of white supremacy on a global scale.

==== Support for imperialism ====
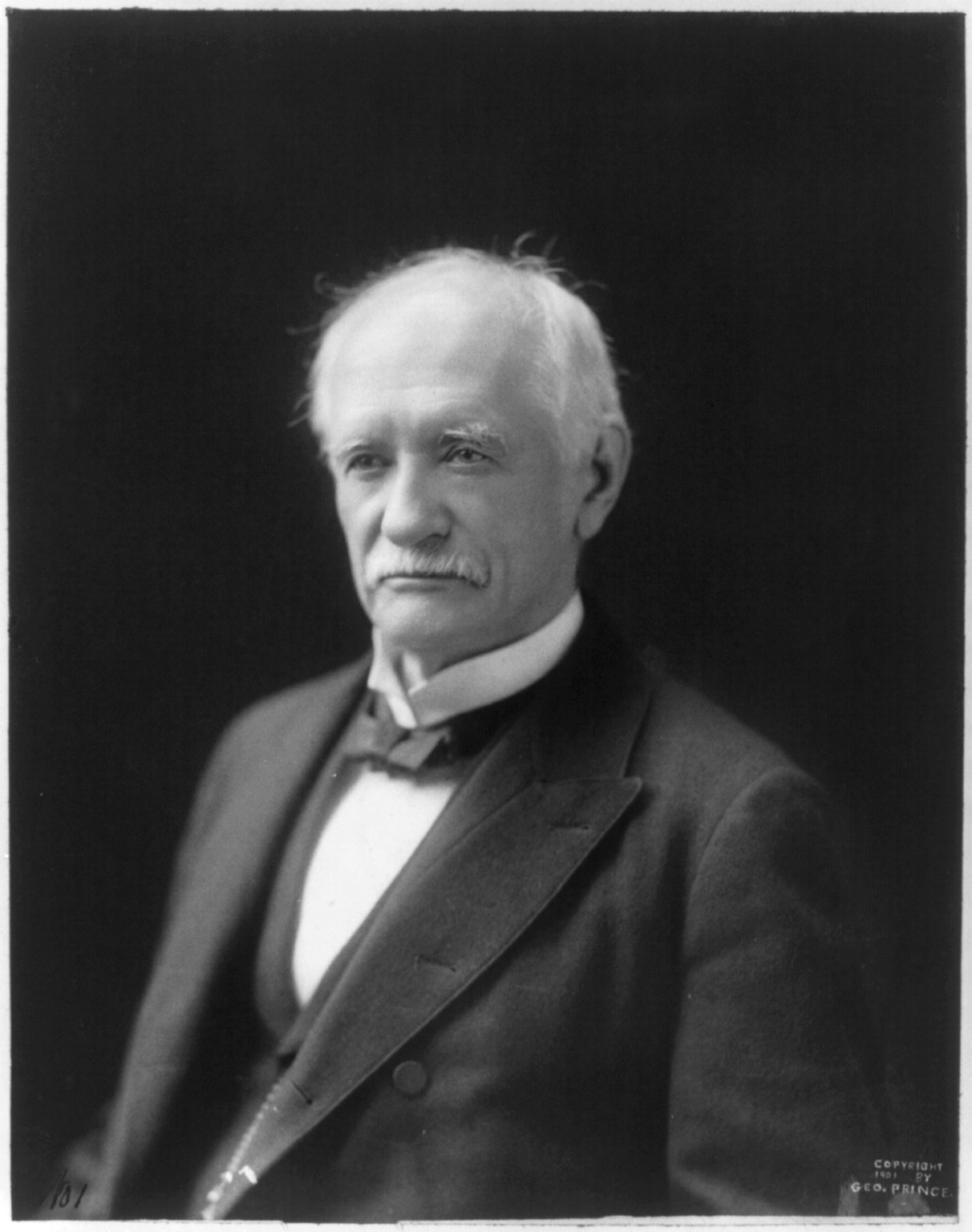
Morgan, aged seventy-seven, circa 1901, six years before his death

Between 1887 and 1907, Morgan played a leading role on the powerful Foreign Relations Committee. He called for a canal linking the Atlantic and Pacific oceans through Nicaragua, enlarging the merchant marine and the Navy, and acquiring Hawaii, Puerto Rico, the Philippines, and Cuba. He expected Latin American and Asian markets to become new export markets for Alabama's cotton, coal, iron, and timber. The canal would make trade with the Pacific much more feasible, and an enlarged military would protect that new trade. By 1905, most of his dreams had become reality, although the canal bifurcated Panama instead of Nicaragua.

Morgan was a strong supporter of the annexation of the Republic of Hawaii, and, in 1894, Morgan chaired an investigation known as the Morgan Report into the Hawaiian Revolution. The investigation concluded that the U.S. had remained completely neutral in the matter. He authored the introduction to the Morgan Report, based on the investigative committee's findings. He later visited Hawaii in 1897 in support of annexation. He believed that the history of the U.S. clearly indicated it was unnecessary to hold a plebiscite in Hawaii as a condition for annexation. He was appointed by President William McKinley in July 1898 to the commission created by the Newlands Resolution to establish government in the Territory of Hawaii. A strong advocate for a Central American canal, Morgan was also a staunch supporter of the Cuban revolutionaries in the 1890s.

== Death and legacy ==
=== Burial and assessment ===
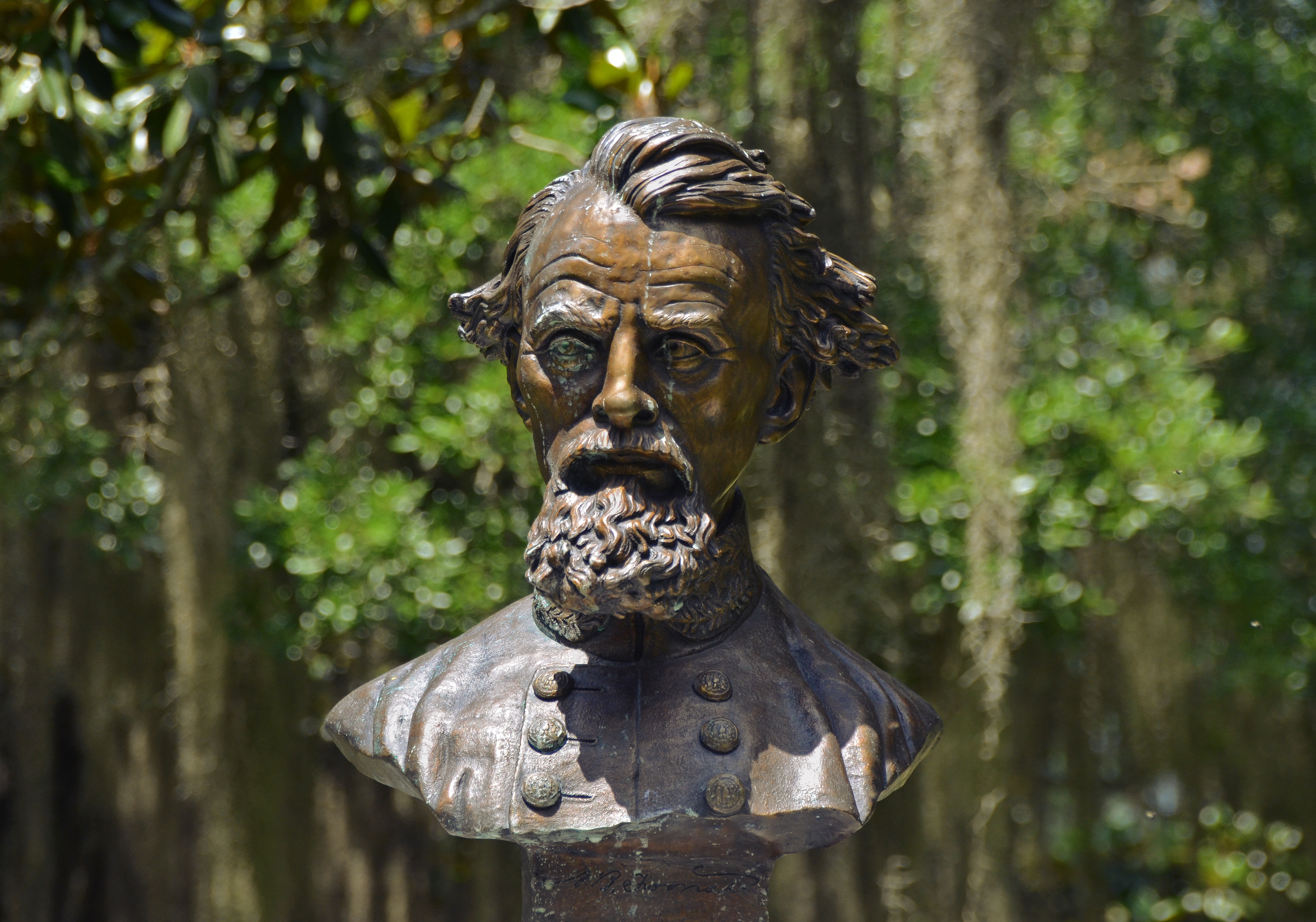
Morgan is buried in Live Oak Cemetery which contains a memorial to fellow Klan leader Nathan Bedford Forrest.

While still in office, Morgan died of a heart attack in Washington, D.C., and John H. Bankhead served the remainder of his term. Morgan was buried in Selma, Alabama, at Live Oak Cemetery, which contains a memorial to fellow Confederate cavalry officer and Ku Klux Klan leader Nathan Bedford Forrest. Morgan's friend and fellow Alabama Klan leader Edmund Pettus is interred in the same cemetery.

In 2004, Professor Thomas Adams Upchurch summarized Morgan's career in the Alabama Review:

His congressional speeches and published writings demonstrate the central role that Morgan played in the drama of racial politics on Capitol Hill and in the national press from 1889 to 1891. More importantly, they reveal his leadership in forging the ideology of white supremacy that dominated American race relations from the 1890s to the 1960s. Indeed, Morgan emerged as the most prominent and notorious racist ideologue of his day, a man who, as much as any other individual, set the tone for the coming Jim Crow era.

=== Family and relatives ===
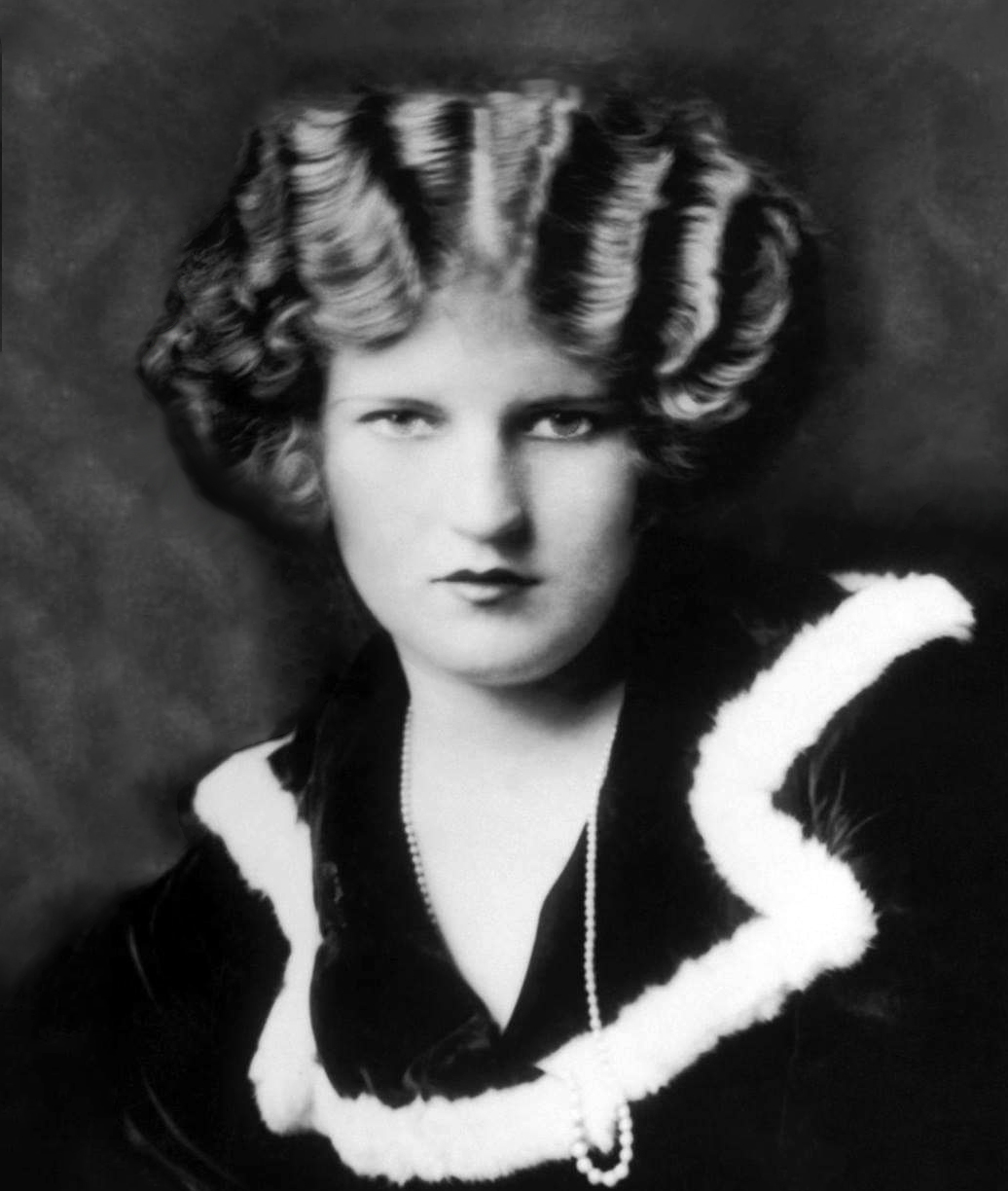
Morgan's grand-niece was Zelda Fitzgerald, the neo-Confederate wife of F. Scott Fitzgerald. Zelda later espoused fascism as a political creed.

As the patriarch of a powerful Southern clan, Morgan's extended relatives remained influential in Alabama politics for many decades. His nephew and protege, Anthony Dickinson Sayre (1858–1931), served first as a member of the Alabama State Senate (1894–95) and then as President of the Alabama State Senate (1896–97). Active in Alabama politics for nearly half a century, Morgan's nephew Anthony D. Sayre is widely regarded by historians as the legal architect who laid the foundation for Alabama's discriminatory Jim Crow laws.

As a state legislator, Sayre played a key role in undermining the Fourteenth and Fifteenth Amendments in Alabama and enabling the ideology of white supremacy. He authored the 1893 Sayre Act, disenfranchising black Alabamians for nearly a century. In 1909, Sayre became an Associate Justice of the Supreme Court of Alabama and served as "one of the sturdiest pillars" of Alabama's racial hierarchy.

Sayre's daughter and Morgan's grand-niece was Zelda Sayre, the neo-Confederate wife of novelist F. Scott Fitzgerald who wrote The Great Gatsby. Raised by her two white supremacist parents, Zelda embraced her family's beliefs, and she proudly described herself to others as "a Typhoid Mary of Confederate tradition... in the frenetic, decadent world of Scott and his friends." Over time, Zelda's political views evolved from neo-Confederate beliefs toward an espousal of fascism as a political creed.

In contrast to her mother Zelda Sayre who cherished her Southern family's political legacy, Morgan's great-grandniece Frances "Scottie" Fitzgerald felt guilt over her family's legacy of white supremacy. Scottie devoted herself to voter outreach for black Alabamians, although many of them declined her social overtures.

=== Memorialization ===

Morgan Academy, a private school located in Selma, Alabama, is named in Morgan's honor. It was founded in 1965 as a segregation academy.
- In 1913, a memorial arch was built on the grounds of the Federal Building and U.S. Courthouse in Selma, Alabama, to honor U.S. Senators Morgan and Pettus, both former Grand Dragons of the Alabama Ku Klux Klan.
- In 1953, amid national tension over the ongoing Brown v. Board of Education litigation, Morgan was elected by vote to membership in the Alabama Hall of Fame.
- In 1965, in the wake of the U.S. Supreme Court ruling that segregated public schools were unconstitutional, white segregationists founded the John T. Morgan Academy in Selma. The segregation academy held its classes in Morgan's old house until a new campus was built in 1967.
- Morgan Hall on the campus of the University of Alabama, which houses the English Department, was named for him. On December 18, 2015, Morgan's portrait was removed from the building, and in 2016 the university was pondering the results of a petition to rename the building for Harper Lee. By June 2020, the Alabama Board of Trustees had finally decided to study the names of buildings on campus and consider changing them. On September 17, 2020, they voted to remove his name from the building.
- In World War II, the United States Liberty ship SS John Morgan was named in his honor.

== See also ==
- Ku Klux Klan members in United States politics
- List of American Civil War generals (Confederate)
- List of members of the United States Congress who died in office (1900–1949)

U.S. Senate
Preceded by George Goldthwaite	U.S. Senator (Class 2) from Alabama; 1877–1907; Served alongside: George E. Spencer, George S. Houston, Luke Pryor, James L. Pugh, Edmund Pettus	Succeeded by John H. Bankhead
Preceded by James G. Blaine	Chair of the Senate Rules Committee; 1879–1881	Succeeded by William P. Frye
Preceded by John Sherman	Chair of the Senate Foreign Relations Committee; 1893–1895	Succeeded by John Sherman
New office	Chair of the Senate Interoceanic Canals Committee; 1899–1903	Succeeded by John H. Mitchell
Preceded by George Graham Vest	Chair of the Senate Public Health Committee; 1903–1907	Succeeded by John W. Daniel
