= Cotton-Eyed Joe =

American country folk song

Song
- Published: Before 1861
- Genre: Country folk

"Cotton-Eyed Joe" (also known as "Cotton-Eye Joe") (Roud 942) is a traditional American country folk song popular at various times throughout the United States and Canada. The song is also an instrumental banjo and bluegrass fiddle standard.

"Cotton-Eyed Joe" has inspired more than one country-western partner dance and line dance. The 1980 film Urban Cowboy included a version of the song. In 1985, the Moody Brothers' version of the song received a Grammy Award nomination for Best Country Instrumental Performance. The Irish group the Chieftains received a Grammy nomination for Best Country Vocal Collaboration for their version of the song with lead vocals by Ricky Skaggs on their 1992 album Another Country. In 1994, a version recorded by the Swedish Eurodance group Rednex as "Cotton Eye Joe" became popular worldwide.

== History ==
=== 19th century ===
The origins of this song are unclear, although it predates the 1861–1865 American Civil War. American folklorist Dorothy Scarborough (1878–1935) noted in her 1925 book On the Trail of Negro Folk-songs that several people remembered hearing the song before the war. Scarborough's account of the song came from her sister, Mrs. George Scarborough, who learned the song from "the Negroes on a plantation in Texas, and other parts from a man in Louisiana". The man in Louisiana knew the song from his earliest childhood and heard slaves singing it on plantations. Both the dance and the song had many variants.

The melody of the song may have originated in Ireland. Paddy Moloney of The Chieftains was on tour in Texas when he heard the song and immediately identified it as an old Irish folk melody, "The Mountain Top".

A number of possible meanings of the term "cotton-eyed" have been proposed. The phrase may refer to: being drunk on moonshine, or having been blinded by drinking wood alcohol, turning the eyes milky white; a black person with very light blue eyes; miners covered in dirt with the exception of their white eyes; someone whose eyes were milky white from bacterial infections of trachoma or syphilis, cataracts or glaucoma; or the contrast of dark skin tone around white eyeballs in black people.

American publishing house Harper and Brothers published the first printed version of the song in 1882. It was heard by author Louise Clarke Pyrnelle (born 1850) on the Alabama plantation of her father when she was a child. That 1882 version was republished as follows in 1910:

Cotton-eyed Joe, Cotton-eyed Joe,
What did make you sarve me so,
Fur ter take my gal erway fum me,
An' cyar her plum ter Tennessee?
Ef it hadn't ben fur Cotton-eyed Joe,
I'd er been married long ergo.

His eyes wuz crossed, an' his nose wuz flat,
An' his teef wuz out, but wat uv dat?
Fur he wuz tall, an' he wuz slim,
An' so my gal she follered him.
Ef it hadn't ben fur Cotton-eyed Joe,
I'd er been married long ergo.

No gal so hansum could be foun',
Not in all dis country roun',
Wid her kinky head, an' her eyes so bright,
Wid her lips so red an' her teef so white.
Ef it hadn't ben fur Cotton-eyed Joe,
I'd been married long ergo.

An' I loved dat gal wid all my heart,
An' she swo' fum me she'd never part;
But den wid Joe she runned away,
An' lef' me hyear fur ter weep all day.

O Cotton-eyed Joe, O Cotton-eyed Joe,
What did make you sarve me so?
O Joe, ef it hadn't er ben fur you,
I'd er married dat gal fur true.

The lyrics of this version, in non-dialectal standard American English are:

Cotton-eyed Joe, Cotton-eyed Joe,
What did make you serve me so,
For to take my gal away from me,
And carry her down to Tennessee?
If it hadn't been for Cotton-eyed Joe,
I'd have been married long ago.

His eyes were crossed, and his nose was flat,
And his teeth were out, but what of that?
For he was tall, and he was slim,
And so my gal she followed him.
If it hadn't been for Cotton-eyed Joe,
I'd have been married long ago.

No gal so handsome could be found,
Not in all this country round,
With her kinky head, and her eyes so bright,
With her lips so red and her teeth so white.
If it hadn't been for Cotton-eyed Joe,
I'd have been married long ago.

And I loved that gal with all my heart,
And she swore from me she'd never part;
But then with Joe she ran away,
And left me here for to weep all day.

O Cotton-eyed Joe, O Cotton-eyed Joe,
What did make you serve me so?
O Joe, if it hadn't been for you,
I'd have married that gal for true.

By 1884, the fiddle-based song was referred to as "an old, familiar air". In 1925, another version was recorded by folklorist Dorothy Scarborough and published.

Don't you remember, don't you know,
Don't you remember Cotton-eyed Joe?
Cotton-eyed Joe, Cotton-eyed Joe,
What did make you treat me so?
I'd 'a' been married forty year ago
Ef it had n't a-been for Cotton-eyed Joe!

Cotton-eyed Joe, Cotton-eyed Joe,
He was de nig dat sarved me so, –
Tuck my gal away fum me,
Carried her off to Tennessee.
I'd 'a' been married forty year ago
If it had n't a-been for Cotton-eyed Joe.

Hi's teeth was out an' his nose was flat,
His eyes was crossed, – but she did n't mind dat.
Kase he was tall, and berry slim,
An' so my gal she follered him.
I'd 'a' been married forty year ago
Ef it had n't a-been for Cotton-eyed Joe.

She was de prettiest gal to be found
Anywhar in de country round;
Her lips was red an' her eyes was bright,
Her skin was black but her teeth was white.
I'd 'a' been married forty year ago
Ef it had n't a-been for Cotton-eyed Joe.

Dat gal, she sho' had all my love,
An swore fum ne she'd never move,
But Joe hoodooed her, don't you see,
An' she run off wid him to Tennessee,
I'd 'a' been married forty years ago,
Ef it hadn't a-been for Cotton-eyed Joe.

Scarborough noted that the song seemed to be well known in the South prior to the Civil War, and parts of it had been sent in by various persons.

Over the years, many different versions of the song have been performed and/or recorded with many different versions of the lyrics (and many without lyrics). "Cotton-Eyed Joe", on occasion referred to as "The South Texas National Anthem", was played for minstrel-type jigs, and it has long been popular as a square dance hoedown and a couple dance polka.

A resident of Central Texas who learned the dance in Williamson County in the early 1880s described it as nothing but a heel and toe "poker" with fringes added. These fringes added to the heel and toe polka were clog steps which required skill and extraversion on the part of the dancer.

=== 20th century ===
"Cotton Eyed Joe", performed by Gid Tanner and his Skillet Lickers (1929).

"Cotton Eyed Joe", performed by the Gunnel Hensmar (1951).

During the first half of the 20th century, the song was a widely known folk song all over English-speaking North America. One discography lists 134 recorded versions released since 1950. In more recent decades, the song has waned in popularity in most regions except some parts of the American South, where it is still a popular folk song.

Bob Wills and Adolph Hofner and his San Antonians both recorded the song, and according to music historian Bill C. Malone, Hofner's 1941 version was the one that did the most to popularize the song. A 1967 instrumental version of the song by Al Dean inspired a new round dance polka for couples.

The dance remained popular in Texas in the 1970s. A circle dance called "Cotton-Eyed Joe" can be found in the 1975 edition of Encyclopedia of Social Dance. The men stand on the inside of a circle facing out, and the women stand on the outside facing in; both circles follow a sequence of kick steps and struts.
