= Marie Bankhead Owen =

American archivist (1869–1958)

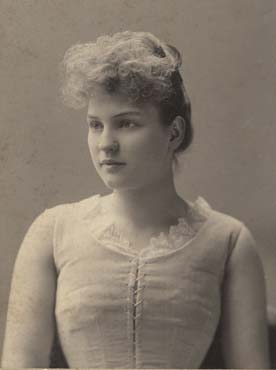
- Marie Bankhead Owen
- Born: September 1, 1869; Bankhead Plantation, Noxubee County, Mississippi, U.S.
- Died: March 1, 1958 (aged 88); Selma, Alabama, U.S.
- Resting place: Greenwood Cemetery, Montgomery, Alabama
- Known for: Director Alabama Dept of Archives and History
- Spouse: Thomas McAdory Owen
- Children: 2
- Parent(s): John H. Bankhead; Tallulah J. Brockman Bankhead

Marie Bankhead Owen (September 1, 1869 – March 1, 1958) was Director of the Alabama Department of Archives and History for over three decades, as well as a documentarian of Alabama history who authored numerous books on the subject. Owen was an advisor for the Federal Writers' Project history of the state. In 1939, Owen helped select the Alabama state motto. She was actively opposed to a Federal mandate giving women the right to vote, and believed in the supremacy of the white race. Owen was inducted into the Alabama Women's Hall of Fame in 1975. Her niece was actress Tallulah Bankhead.

== Early life ==
Marie Bankhead Owen was born one of five children on September 1, 1869, into an influential family on the Bankhead Plantation, Noxubee County, Mississippi. Her father was John Hollis Bankhead and her mother was Tallulah J. Brockman Bankhead.

Marie's paternal ancestors emigrated from Northern Ireland to South Carolina during the 18th century. Her great-great-grandfather was a Revolutionary War participant named John Hollis. Her father served in the Confederate States Army during the Civil War. During reconstruction, he became a political activist with a platform of white supremacy. He belonged to the Democratic Party and was a supporter of the presidential candidacy of William Jennings Bryan. He served in various capacities, including the United States House of Representatives (1855–1906) and the United States Senate (1907–1920).

Marie had one sister, Louise Bankhead Perry Lund, and three brothers, United States Army officer Henry McAuley Bankhead, United States Senator John H. Bankhead II and Speaker of the House of Representatives of the United States William B. Bankhead, the father of actress Tallulah Bankhead. Her family enrolled her in Ward's Seminary in Nashville. She married Thomas McAdory Owen (1866-1920) on April 12, 1893. The couple had two sons, Thomas McAdory Owen Jr. and John Hollis Bankhead Owen. After her marriage, she was actively involved with the Daughters of the American Revolution, United Daughters of the Confederacy, as well as other women's social clubs of the day. It was during this period that she began to write extensively about Alabama history.

== Alabama Department of Archives and History (ADAH) ==
The state-funded Alabama Department of Archives and History (ADAH) was created by an act of the Alabama State Legislature and signed into law by Governor William J. Samford on February 27, 1901. Thomas McAdory Owen was a history aficionado and a member of the Alabama Historical Society. Together with the help and influence of the Bankhead family, he wrote the legislation that was signed by Governor Samford, and was named the agency's first director on March 2, 1901. When he died on March 25, 1920, ADAH's board of directors named Marie Bankhead Owen as his successor. She authored many texts on Alabama history for the agency, and remained in her post until her retirement in 1955. When the New Deal Federal Writers' Project worked on the state's history, Owen meticulously supervised and edited the output.

== Alabama state motto ==
Audemus jura nostra defendere, or We Dare to Defend our Rights, was adopted as Alabama's state motto on March 14, 1939, replacing the state's Reconstruction Era motto of Here We Rest. As ADAH director, Owen was helping coordinate the design of an Alabama coat of arms, and felt the state needed a motto more representative of Alabamians. The words she selected were inspired by An Ode in Imitation of Alcaeus, written in 1781 by Sir William Jones. Latin translation was provided by a University of Alabama professor, W.B. Saffold.

== Women's suffrage and civil rights ==
Owen was the organizer and head of the Southern Anti-Suffrage Association, opposed to the Nineteenth Amendment to the United States Constitution. The organization's platform was based on a States' rights priority of deciding whether or not women should be allowed to vote. Within the agenda was also the concern that a Federal mandate giving women the vote would re-open the issue of voting rights for citizens of color. The issue of race and a woman's right to vote seemed to go hand-in-hand in Alabama. The Alabama Association Opposed to Woman Suffrage linked the issue to a threat to white supremacy. Owen was additionally head of the Woman's Anti-Ratification League, an organization that stated its position on ratification opposition as based in white supremacy.

== Death ==
Marie Bankhead Owen died at a rest home in Selma on March 1, 1958, aged 88, and is buried at Greenwood Cemetery, Montgomery, Alabama. She was inducted into the Alabama Women's Hall of Fame in 1975.

== Bibliography ==
- Owen, Marie Bankhead; Alabama Centennial Commission (2010) [1919]. De Soto And The Indians. First Of A Series Of Children's Plays In Commemoration Of The Close Of A Century Of Statehood. Nabu Press. ISBN 978-1-172-18408-8.
- Owen, Marie Bankhead (1919). At Old Mobile: Second of a series of children's plays in commemoration of the close of a century of statehood. The Paragon Press.
- Owen, Marie Bankhead (2010) [1919]. How Alabama became a state; Third of a series of children's plays in commemoration of the close of a century of statehood. Nabu Press. ISBN 978-1-149-90961-4.
- Owen, Marie Bankhead (1919). The battle of Maubilla: Part of a series of children's plays in commemoration of the close of a century of statehood. The Paragon Press.
- Owen, Marie Bankhead; Owen, Thomas McAdory (2012) [1921]. History of Alabama and Dictionary of Alabama Biography, Vol 1. Nabu Press. ISBN 978-1-274-33483-1.
- Owen, Marie Bankhead; Owen, Thomas McAdory (2012) [1921]. History of Alabama and Dictionary of Alabama Biography, Vol 2. Nabu Press. ISBN 978-1-274-54326-4.
- Owen, Marie Bankhead; Owen, Thomas McAdory (2010) [1921]. History of Alabama and Dictionary of Alabama Biography, Vol 4. Nabu Press. ISBN 978-1-174-08358-7.
- Owen, Marie Bankhead (1927). Yvonne of Braithwaite: A romance of the Mississippi Delta. L.C. Page & Company.
- Owen, Marie Bankhead (1927). Our State Alabama. Birmingham Printing Co.
- Owen, Marie Bankhead; Crumpton, Ethel H.; Glick, Nathan (1936). From campfire to Cahaba. Dixie Book.
- Owen, Marie Bankhead (1938). Alabama: A social and economic history of the state (Southland series). Dixie Book Company.
- Owen, Marie Bankhead (1940). The Alabama Historical Quarterly (Fall 1940) "World War Memorial Building cover". Alabama Department of Archives and History.
- Owen, Marie Bankhead (1940). The Alabama Historical Quarterly (Winter Issue 1940; Canaan Baptist Church cover). Alabama Department of Archives and History.
- Owen, Marie Bankhead (1945). The Alabama Historical Quarterly (Fall 1945) "Governor William C. Oates". Alabama Department of Archives and History.
- Owen, Marie Bankhead (1945). The Alabama Historical Quarterly (Winter 1945) "General Albert Sidney Johnston". Alabama Department of Archives and History.
- Owen, Marie Bankhead (1948). The Alabama Historical Quarterly (1948) "Old Homes in Talladega County". Alabama Department of Archives and History.
- Owen, Marie Bankhead (1949). The Story of Alabama, A History of the State, Volume III. New York: Lewis Historical Publishing.
- Owen, Marie Bankhead (1949). The story of Alabama: A history of the state. Lewis Historical Publishing.
- Owen, Marie Bankhead; Kirkpatrick, Emmett (1968) [1951]. The Alabama Historical Quarterly 1951 Volume 13, No.'s 1,2,3,4. State Department of Archives and History.
- Owen, Marie Bankhead (1952). The Alabama Historical Quarterly (Volume 14). Alabama Department of Archives and History.
- Owen, Marie Bankhead (1954). The Alabama Historical Quarterly (Fall and Winter Issue 1954) "Mobile History Reader". Alabama Department of Archives and History.
- Owen, Marie Bankhead; Kirkpatrick, Emmett (1981). The Alabama Historical Quarterly Vol. 13 Nos. 1, 2, 3, and 4-1981 Reprint. State Department of Archives and History.
