= Zadoc L. Weatherford =

American politician

Zadoc Lorenzo Weatherford
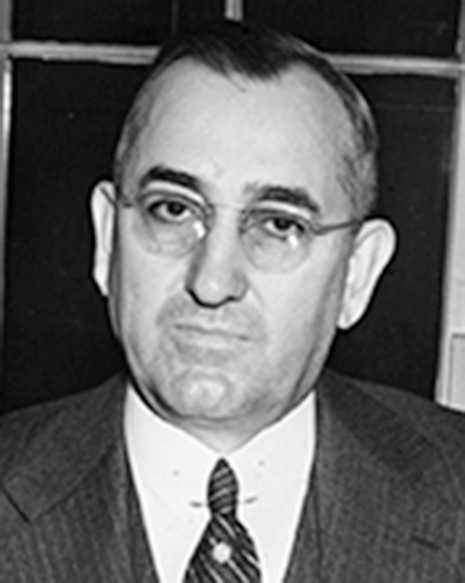

Member of the U.S. House of Representatives from Alabama's 7th district
- In office November 5, 1940 – January 3, 1941
- Preceded by: William B. Bankhead
- Succeeded by: Walter W. Bankhead

Personal details
- Born: February 4, 1888 Marion County, Alabama, U.S.
- Died: May 21, 1983 (aged 95) Red Bay, Alabama, U.S.
- Party: Democratic

Zadoc Lorenzo Weatherford (February 4, 1888 – May 21, 1983) was a U.S. representative from Alabama for the Democratic Party.

Born on a farm in Marion County, Alabama, near Vina, Franklin County, Weatherford attended the public schools. He earned an M.D. from the University of Tennessee at Memphis in 1914, and served as an intern at St. Joseph Hospital in Memphis from 1914 to 1916. He moved to Red Bay, Alabama in 1916 and began a general medical practice.

During World War I, he served from August 26, 1917, as battalion surgeon in the Three Hundred and Twenty-sixth Infantry and was discharged on October 6, 1920. He was awarded a Purple Heart. After leaving the army, he was subdistrict medical officer for the United States Veterans' Bureau in Montgomery, Alabama from 1922 to 1924, and then resumed medical practice in Red Bay.

He was also interested in banking and agricultural pursuits, and held farming interests in both Alabama and Mississippi. He became president of the Bank of Red Bay in 1938, a position he would hold until 1970.

Weatherford served as vice chairman of the Franklin County Democratic Committee from 1933 to 1937, and then in the Alabama State Senate from 1939 until his election to the U.S. Congress in 1940. He was elected to fill a vacancy caused by the death of William B. Bankhead, and served out the last few months of Bankhead's term, from November 5, 1940, to January 3, 1941, but did not run for reelection to a full term. After leaving Congress, he resumed his medical profession and entered local politics, serving as mayor of Red Bay from 1945 to 1948. He retired from active medical practice on January 1, 1958, and died in Red Bay on May 21, 1983.

U.S. House of Representatives
| Preceded by William B. Bankhead | Member of the U.S. House of Representatives from Alabama's 7th congressional district November 5, 1940–January 3, 1941 | Succeeded by Walter W. Bankhead |
