= Perote Guards =

Infantry company of the Confederate States Army

Perote Guards Company D, 1st Regiment Alabama Infantry
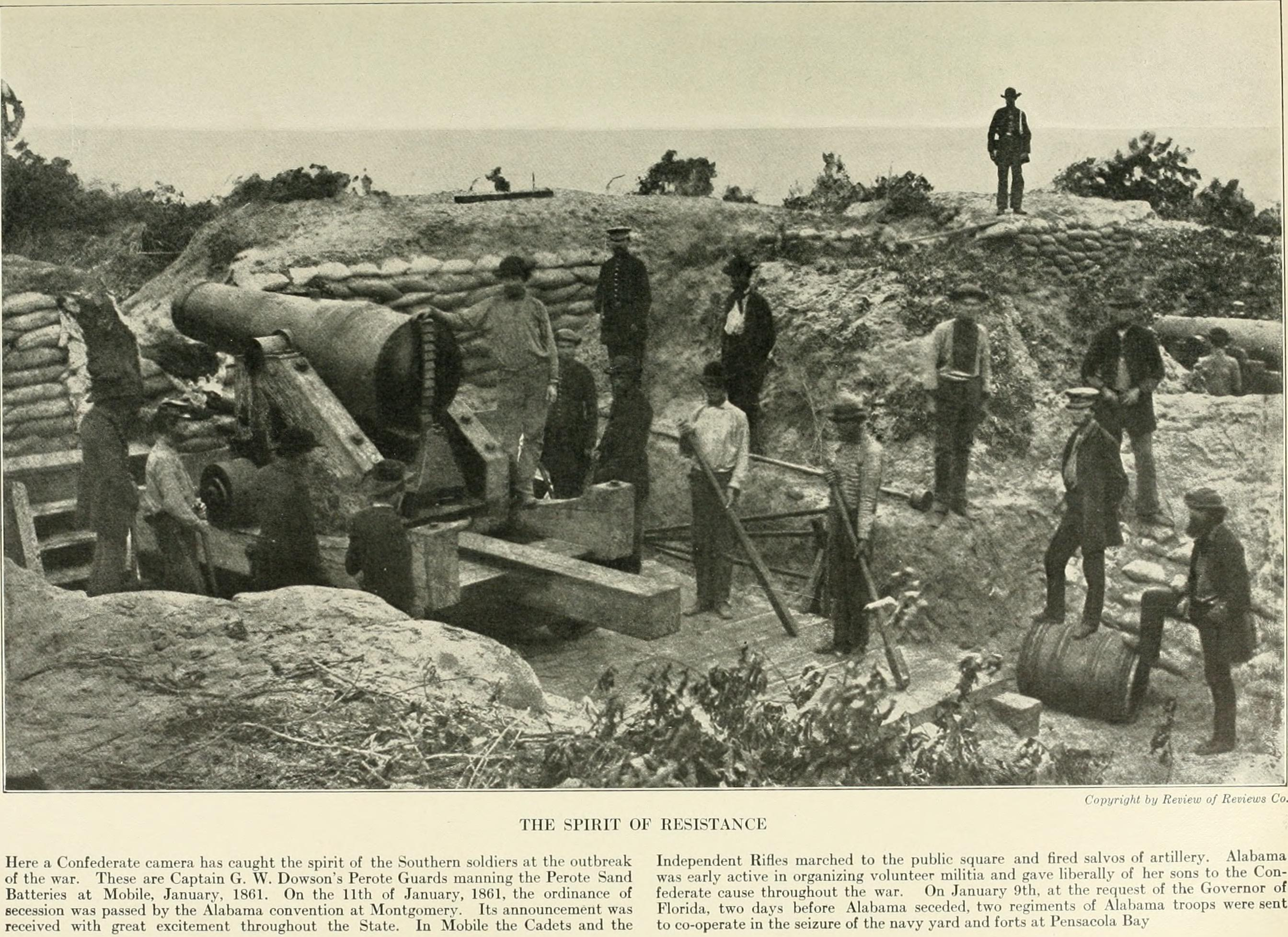
- Perote Guards manning the Perote Sand Batteries at Mobile, Alabama, January 1861
- Active: 1859 to April 7, 1862
- Disbanded: April 7, 1862
- Country: Confederate States of America
- Branch: Confederate States Army
- Type: Infantry
- Part of: 1st Regiment Alabama Infantry
- Engagements: American Civil War

The first battle flag of the Perote Guards (Flag used September, 1860 - Summer, 1861)

The Perote Guards were organized in 1859 in Perote, presently in Bullock County, Alabama. The first Captain was George William Dawson. They were sent to Pensacola, Florida, where they became Company D of the 1st Alabama Infantry Regiment. The 1st Alabama Infantry surrendered on April 7, 1862, at Island No. 10.

== History of the flag ==
The company's uniforms and flag were handmade by the ladies of Perote. The flag was presented to the Guards in September 1860 by Miss Crossley and received for the company by M. B. Locke on the steps of the Methodist Church. Upon receipt of a regimental flag, in the summer of 1861, the company flags were placed with the regimental quartermaster for safe keeping. Following the surrender of the 1st Alabama Infantry, the flag was seized from the company baggage by members of the 15th Wisconsin Infantry and eventually carried back to Wisconsin. Dr. Thomas Owen, Director of the Alabama Department of Archives and History, learned of the flag's location and requested its return in the summer of 1903. Ruben G. Thwaites, Secretary of the State Historical Society of Wisconsin, replied on June 19, 1903, that he felt the Society would be quite willing to return the flag. This, however, would require a resolution by the Wisconsin legislature which did not meet again until January 1905. On March 15, 1905, acting Governor of Alabama Russel M. Cunningham requested that the flag be returned. Joint Resolution Number 29-S of the Legislature of the State of Wisconsin, April 13, 1905, approved the return of the flag and it was finally received on August 5, 1905.

== See also ==
- List of Alabama Civil War Confederate units
