= William Stanley Hoole =

American librarian, historian (1903–1990)

- Born: May 16, 1903; Darlington, South Carolina, U.S.
- Died: December 12, 1990 (aged 87); Tuscaloosa, Alabama, U.S.
- Resting place: Grove Hill Cemetery, Darlington, South Carolina, U.S.
- Other names: W. Stanley Hoole; Will Stanley; W. S. Hoole; Bill Hoole
- Education: Wofford College (BA, MA), Duke University (PhD); North Texas State University (BS)
- Occupations: Historian, librarian, author, editor, publisher, educator
- Spouse(s): Martha Anne Sanders (m. 1930–1960; her death); Addie Foster Shirley Coleman (m. 1970–1990; his death)
- Children: 5
- Awards: Fulbright scholar

William Stanley Hoole (May 16, 1903 – December 12, 1990), also known as W. Stanley Hoole, was an American historian, librarian, author, editor, publisher, and educator. He worked at the University of Alabama (UA) where he served as the dean emeritus of university libraries, and professor emeritus of library service. Hoole's scholarly work was focused in Southern history, the Alabama Confederacy, and the history of the University of Alabama; additionally he created the Confederate Publishing Company. He sometimes used the pen name Will Stanley.

== Early life and education ==
William Stanley Hoole was born on May 16, 1903, in Darlington, South Carolina. His parents were Mary "Minnie" Eva (née Powers) and William Brunson Hoole.

On August 2, 1931, he married Martha Anne Sanders, and had children. After the death of his first wife, his second marriage was in 1970 to Addie Foster Shirley Coleman.

Hoole graduated Wofford College (BA 1924, MA 1931) in Spartanburg, South Carolina. He received a doctorate degree in 1934 from Duke University in Durham, North Carolina. He continued his studies and graduated (BS 1943 in library science) from North Texas State University (now University of North Texas) in Denton, Texas.

He was a Fulbright scholar in England, where he studied the CSS Alabama. He received honorary degrees from Wofford College (Litt.D. 1954); University of Alabama (LL.D. 1975); and Francis Marion College (D. Humanities 1980).

== Career ==
Hoole worked as a teacher at Spartanburg High School in Spartanburg, South Carolina from 1924 until 1925, and Darlington High School in Darlington, South Carolina from 1927 until 1931.

He worked at Birmingham–Southern College as a professor from 1934 until 1935, and as a librarian from 1935 until 1937. This was followed by work as a librarian at Baylor University in Waco, Texas from 1937 to 1939.

Hoole served as the director of libraries at North Texas State University (now University of North Texas) in Denton, Texas from 1939 until 1944; while he attended the school as a student.

He was a founding member of the Alabama Historical Association when it was established in 1947, and served as editor of its journal, The Alabama Review, from 1948 to 1967.

Hoole worked at the University of Alabama (UA) in Tuscaloosa, Alabama, as the dean of libraries, from 1944 until 1971; as a professor of librarianship, from 1971 until 1973; and as dean emeritus of university libraries and professor emeritus of library service after his retirement in 1973. During his time at UA, Hoole turned a six libraries system into a single library system, he was able to secured academic status for library staff, and he established new libraries. His work at the library led to the university library's membership in the Association of Research Libraries.

After his retirement from UA, Hoole focused on publishing books and created his own publishing company, Confederate Publishing Company.

== Death and legacy ==
Hoole died on December 12, 1990, in Tuscaloosa, Alabama. He was buried at Grove Hill Cemetery in Darlington, South Carolina.

The University of Alabama (UA) in Tuscaloosa has the W.S. Hoole Special Collections Library named in his honor (formerly known as the Special Collections Department, and shortened as Hoole Library); which holds a collection of rare books. The collection includes media on the subject of the State of Alabama, and media related to the university's activities and history.

== Publications ==
- Hoole, William Stanley (1936). A Check-list and Finding-list of Charleston Periodicals, 1732–1864. Durham, North Carolina: Duke University Press.
- Hoole, William Stanley (1964). Four Years in the Confederate Navy. Athens, Georgia: University of Georgia Press.; about Captain John Low on the CSS Fingal
- Hoole, William Stanley (1973). According to Hoole: The Collected Essays and Tales of a Scholar-librarian and Literary Maverick. University of Alabama Press. ISBN 9780817371029.
- Hoole, William Stanley (1982). Louise Clarke Pyrnelle; a Biography with Selections from Her Writings. Alabama: Confederate Publishing Company.; about writer Louise Clarke Pyrnelle from Alabama
- Hurst, M.B. (1982). Hoole, William Stanley (ed.). History of the Fourteenth Regiment Alabama Volunteers (2nd ed.).
- Burton, Cpt. Joseph Q.; Botsford, Pvt. Theophilus F. (1982). Hoole, William Stanley (ed.). Historical Sketches of the 47th Alabama Infantry, CSA (2nd ed.). Confederate Publishing Company.; about the 47th Alabama Infantry Regiment
- Gilmer, Pvt. Morton (1983). Hoole, William Stanley (ed.). History of Shockley's Alabama Escort Company (2nd ed.). Confederate Publishing Company.;about an independent cavalry escort recruited from cadets at the University Of Alabama and served under Captain Branscom Shockley
- Hoole, William Stanley; Hoole, Addie Shirley (1984). Alabama's Boy Generals of the Confederacy. Alabama: Confederate Publishing Company.
