= Collirene, Alabama =

Unincorporated community in Alabama, US

- Unincorporated community
- Location within Alabama Location within the United States
- Coordinates: 32°10′34″N 86°49′25″W
- Country: United States
- State: Alabama
- County: Lowndes
- Elevation: 518 ft (158 m)
- Time zone: UTC-6 (Central (CST))
  - Summer (DST): UTC-5 (CDT)
- Area code: 334
- GNIS feature ID: 116450

Collirene /ˌkɑːləˈrin/ (also Sand Hill, Hays Hill, Hayes Hill) is an unincorporated community in Lowndes County, Alabama, United States.

Thomas Perkins Abernethy (1890–1975), writer, historian, and educator, was born in Collirene.
