= Moscow, Lamar County, Alabama =

Unincorporated community in Alabama, US

Moscow, Alabama
- Unincorporated community
- Location within Alabama Location within the United States
- Coordinates: 33°52′11″N 88°06′10″W
- Country: United States
- State: Alabama
- County: Lamar
- Elevation: 413 ft (126 m)
- Time zone: UTC-6 (Central (CST))
  - Summer (DST): UTC-5 (CDT)
- Area codes: 205, 659
- GNIS feature ID: 123100

Moscow is an unincorporated community in Lamar County, Alabama, United States, located southeast of Sulligent.

== History ==
A post office operated under the name Moscow from 1826 to 1923.

== Notable people ==
- John H. Bankhead, U.S. Senator from 1907 to 1920.
- John H. Bankhead II, United States Senator from 1931 to 1946. Son of John Bankhead.
- William B. Bankhead, member of the United States House of Representatives from 1917 to 1940. Served as the Speaker of the United States House of Representatives from 1936 to 1940.
