= Alabama Historical Association =

American historical society

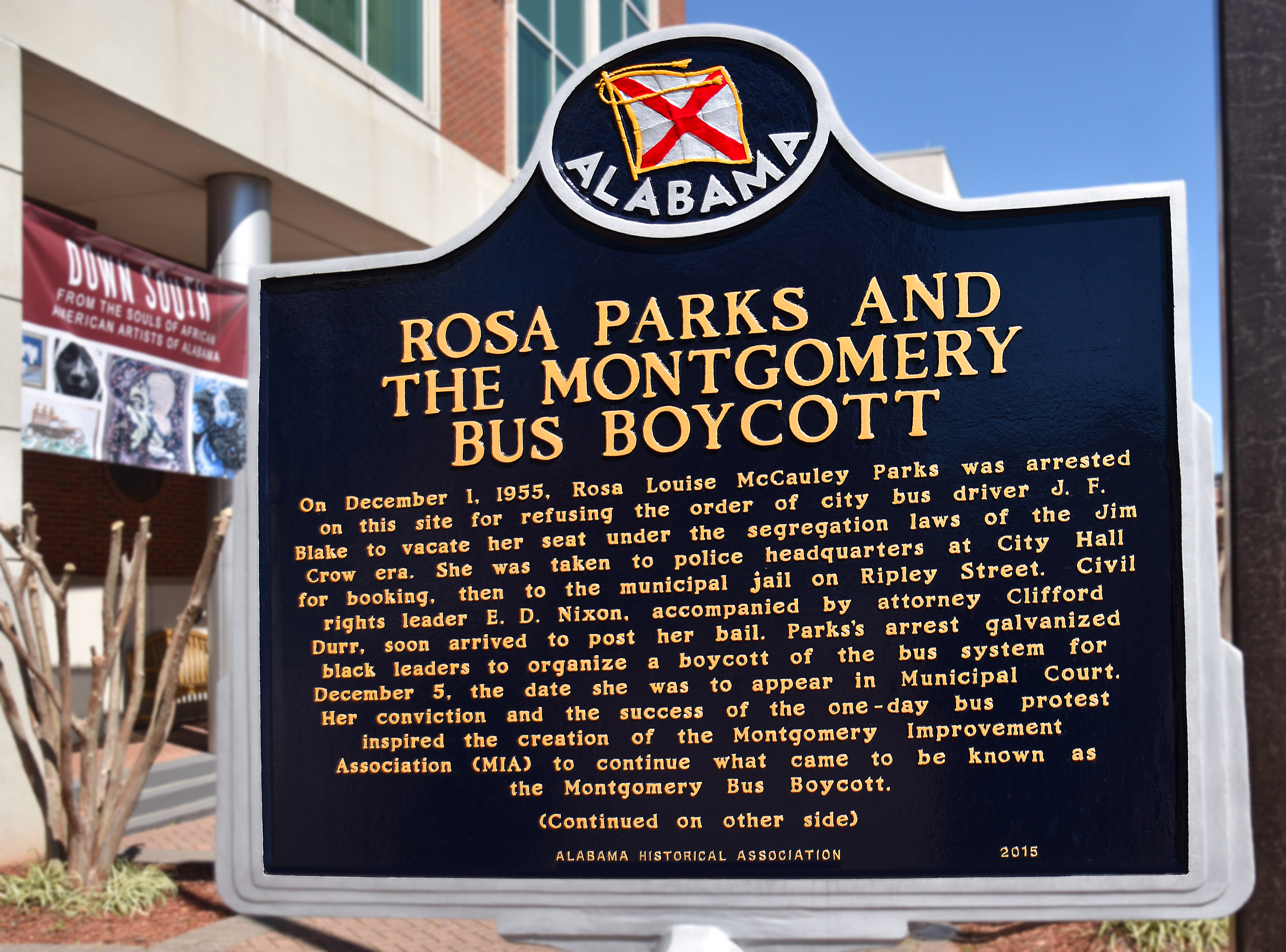
Historical marker erected in Montgomery by the Alabama Historical Association

The Alabama Historical Association (established 1947) of Alabama, United States, is an historical society that aims to "discover, procure, preserve, and diffuse whatever may relate to the natural, civil, literary, cultural, economic, ecclesiastical, and political history of the state of Alabama."

James Frederick Sulzby (1905–1988) served as president of the organization from 1947 through 1949. The rest of the officers for 1947 included Dr. A. B. Moore as Vice President and Maud McLure Kelly as Secretary-Treasurer. The Executive Committee included Dr. Henry T. Shanks, Dr. William Pratt Dale, Mr. William H. Brantley and Dr. A. W. Reynolds.

In 1948 the group launched the quarterly journal The Alabama Review (ISSN 0002-4341). The association also oversees a program of historical markers throughout the state. Membership meetings are held at least annually.

William Stanley Hoole was a founding member of the AHA, and served as the editor of The Alabama Review, from 1948 to 1967. As of 2022, the president of AHA is Jim Bagget of the Birmingham Public Library.

== See also ==
- Alabama Department of Archives and History (est. 1901), government agency
- Alabama Historical Commission (est. 1966), government agency
- Alabama Historical Society (1850-1905)

== Bibliography ==
- James F. Sulzby, Jr. (1988). "Alabama Historical Association: Human Retrospection of Forty Years". Alabama Review. 41.
- Leah Rawls Atkins (1997). "Alabama Historical Association: The First Fifty Years" (PDF). Alabama Review. 50.
- Donald C. Rice (1997). "Biographical Sketches of the Presidents of the Alabama Historical Association: Part I, First through Twelfth Presidents, 1947-1960". Alabama Review. 50. Archived from the original on 2017-03-25.
- Norwood Kerr (2009). "Roadside Stories". Alabama Heritage. 91. (About historical markers)
