= Walter W. Bankhead =

American politician (1897–1988)

Walter Will Bankhead
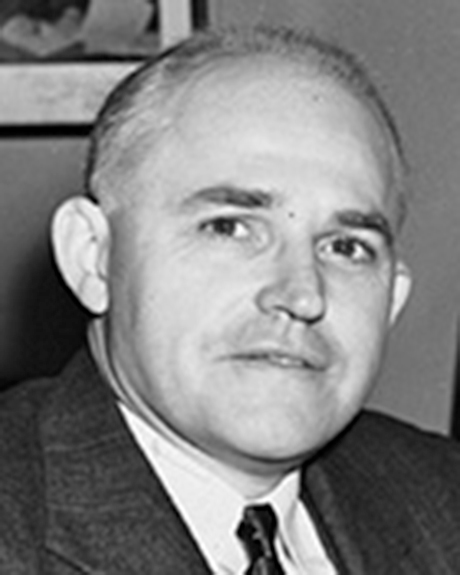

Member of the U.S. House of Representatives from Alabama's 7th district
- In office January 3, 1941 – February 1, 1941
- Preceded by: Zadoc L. Weatherford
- Succeeded by: Carter Manasco

Personal details
- Born: Walter Will Bankhead; July 21, 1897 Jasper, Alabama, U.S.
- Died: November 24, 1988 (aged 91) Jasper, Alabama, U.S.
- Resting place: Oak Hill Cemetery
- Spouse: Emelil Crumpton
- Children: 3
- Parent: John H. Bankhead II (father)
- Relatives: John H. Bankhead (grandfather); William B. Bankhead (uncle); Tallulah Bankhead (cousin); Henry Hoke (greatgrandson)
- Education: University of Alabama at Tuscaloosa; University of Alabama School of Law

Walter Will Bankhead (July 21, 1897 – November 24, 1988) was an American politician and lawyer. A member of the Democratic Party, he served as a U.S. representative from Alabama's 7th congressional district in 1941. He was the son of John Hollis Bankhead II and the grandson of John H. Bankhead, both of whom represented Alabama in the United States Senate.

== Early life ==
Walter Will Bankhead was born on July 21, 1897, in Jasper, Alabama. Bankhead attended the public schools. He was the son of John Hollis Bankhead II, grandson of John H. Bankhead, nephew of William Brockman Bankhead, and cousin of Tallulah Bankhead.

He graduated from Marion Military Institute in 1916, from the University of Alabama at Tuscaloosa in 1919, and from the law department of the University of Alabama School of Law in 1920. He was admitted to the bar in 1920 and commenced practice in Jasper.

== Career ==
Bankhead served as a delegate to the 1940 Democratic National Convention in Chicago. Less than two months before the general election that fall, his uncle, U.S. House Speaker William B. Bankhead, died. A local doctor, Zadoc L. Weatherford, was elected to the remainder of the late Speaker's term, but did not seek election to the full term. Walter Bankhead agreed to run for the full term, but stipulated he would resign after a month in office, thus allowing time for a long-term successor to his uncle to be chosen in a special election. He thus served in the Seventy-seventh Congress as a Democrat from January 3 to February 1, 1941, when he resigned.

Bankhead then resumed the practice of law, and served as chairman of the board of Bankhead Mining Co., Inc., and Bankhead Development Co., Inc. He also served as president of Mammoth Packing Co. and Bankhead Broadcasting Co., Inc., and as vice chairman of the board of directors of the First National Bank of Jasper.

== Personal life ==
He had two daughters and one son: Blossom, Barbara, and John Hollis Bankhead III.

== Death ==
Bankhead died at his home in Jasper on November 24, 1988. He was interred at Oak Hill Cemetery in Jasper.

U.S. House of Representatives
Preceded by Zadoc L. Weatherford	Member of the U.S. House of Representatives from Alabama's 7th congressional district January 3, 1941–February 1, 1941	Succeeded by Carter Manasco
