= John Tyler Morgan House =

Historic house in Alabama, United States

- U.S. National Register of Historic Places
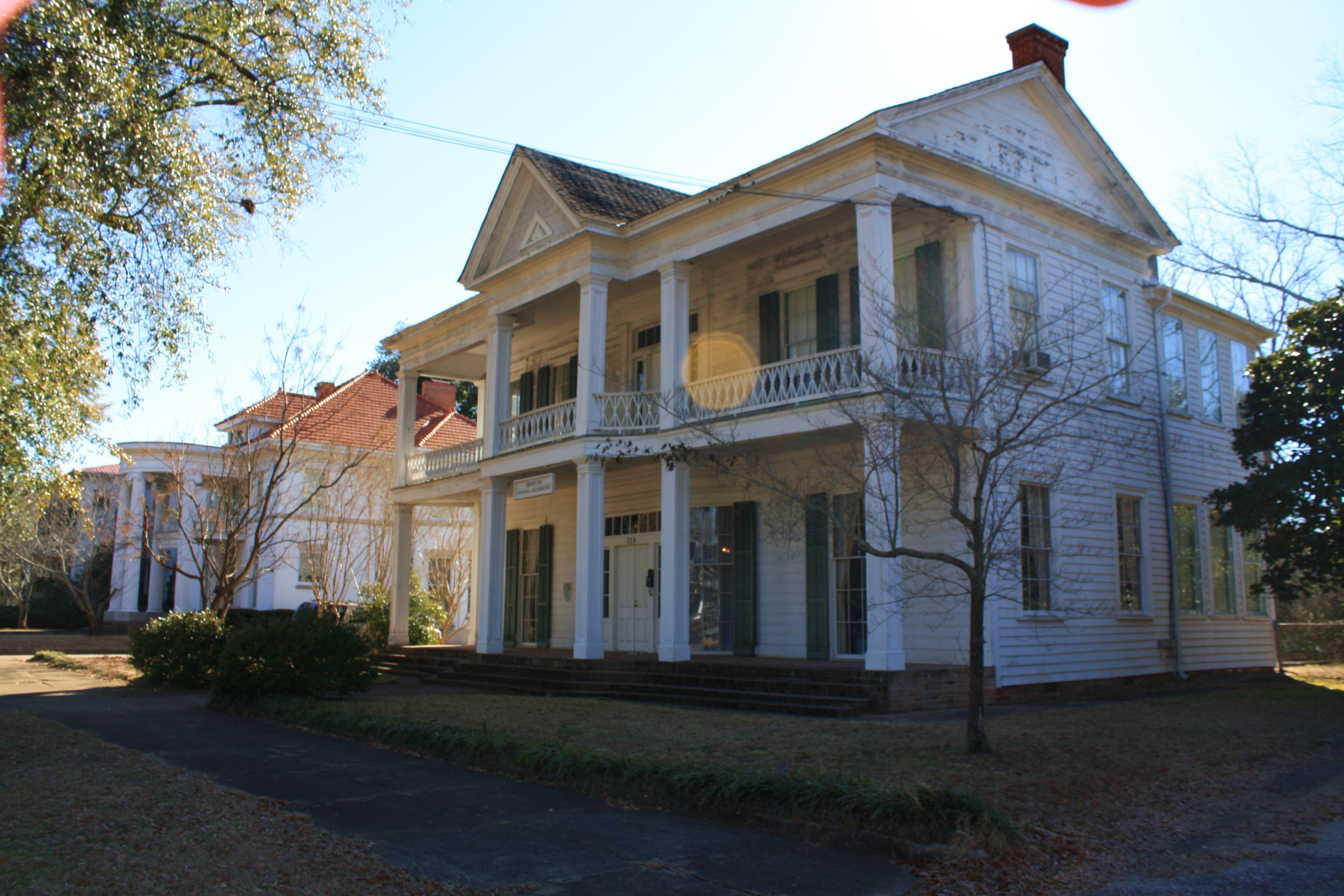
- The house in 2011

- Location within Alabama Location within the United States
- Location: 719 Tremont St., Selma, Alabama
- Coordinates: 32°24′49″N 87°1′39″W
- Area: 0.4 acres (0.16 ha)
- Built: 1859
- NRHP reference No.: 72000159
- Added to NRHP: September 27, 1972

The John Tyler Morgan House is a historic Greek Revival-style house in Selma, Alabama, United States. It was built by Thomas R. Wetmore in 1859 and sold to John Tyler Morgan in 1865. Morgan was a Confederate brigadier general amid the American Civil War and the second Grand Dragon of the Ku Klux Klan in Alabama during the Reconstruction era. In 1876, Morgan stepped down as supreme leader of the Alabama Klan and was elected as a Democratic U.S. senator from Alabama for six terms. He used this house as his primary residence for many of those years.

The building housed John T. Morgan Academy, a prominent segregation academy, from its incorporation in June 1965 until a new campus was completed in 1967. The house was added to the National Register of Historic Places on September 27, 1972, due to its historical significance. It currently houses the Alabama Historical Commission's Old Cahawba Administrative Offices.

== See also ==
- John T. Morgan
- John T. Morgan Academy
