= John T. Morgan Academy =

Former segregation academy in Selma, Alabama, United States

Location
- 2901 West Dallas Ave; Selma, Alabama, Dallas County 36701; United States; 32°23′24″N 87°04′43″W

Information
- Type: Private, Co-educational
- Established: June 1965 (61 years ago)
- CEEB code: 012433
- Headmaster: Bryan Oliver
- Grades: K-12
- Campus size: 20 acres (8.1 ha)
- Nickname: Senators
- Website: morganacademy.com

John T. Morgan Academy, commonly known as Morgan Academy, is a private school in Selma, Alabama. Established in June 1965 as a segregation academy, the school was named after Confederate general and Ku Klux Klan leader John Tyler Morgan. The institution remained segregated for over forty years after its founding and did not admit its first black student until 2008, a decision that sparked protests by hundreds of parents and the resignation of a board member. As of 2024, the student body is reportedly 96% White, and less than 1% is Black.

== History ==
The school was named in honor of John Tyler Morgan, a Confederate brigadier general and the second Grand Dragon of the Ku Klux Klan in Alabama during the Reconstruction era. As a six-term United States Senator representing Alabama from 1877–1907, Morgan was an outspoken proponent of racial segregation, black disfranchisement, and lynching African-Americans.

In June 1965, after the Selma to Montgomery marches by civil rights activists, the school was founded as a segregation academy. Its first classes were held in the John Tyler Morgan House until a new campus was built in 1967. Shortly after its founding, the private academy was publicly endorsed in newspaper advertisements by prominent segregationists such as Governor George C. Wallace of Alabama, Mayor Joseph Smitherman of Selma, and Alabama State Senator Walter C. Givhan.

Throughout the 1970s, the school was denied federal tax-exempt status for excluding Black students. In 1982, the Reagan administration directed the Internal Revenue Service to restore federal tax exemptions for racially discriminatory institutions such as John T. Morgan Academy, a decision which drew national criticism for reinforcing segregation. At the time, the school's enrollment consisted of about 700 white students, with no Black students admitted since its opening in 1965.

In 2008, after 41 years, the school desegregated and admitted its first black student. The decision sparked protests involving some 500 parents and prompted the resignation of a board member. After two years at Morgan, the black student departed for a public elementary school.

Circa 2024, the school reportedly had an enrollment of 333 students, of whom 96% were White, 1.2% Asian or Asian/Pacific Islander, 1.2% Hispanic/Latino, and 0.9% Black or African American. The surrounding Dallas County in which the school is located is 70% Black and 27% White.

== Notable alumni ==
- Gunnar Henderson (2019), MLB All-Star shortstop

== See also ==
- Segregation academies
- Lowndes Academy
