= John H. Bankhead =

American politician (1842–1920)

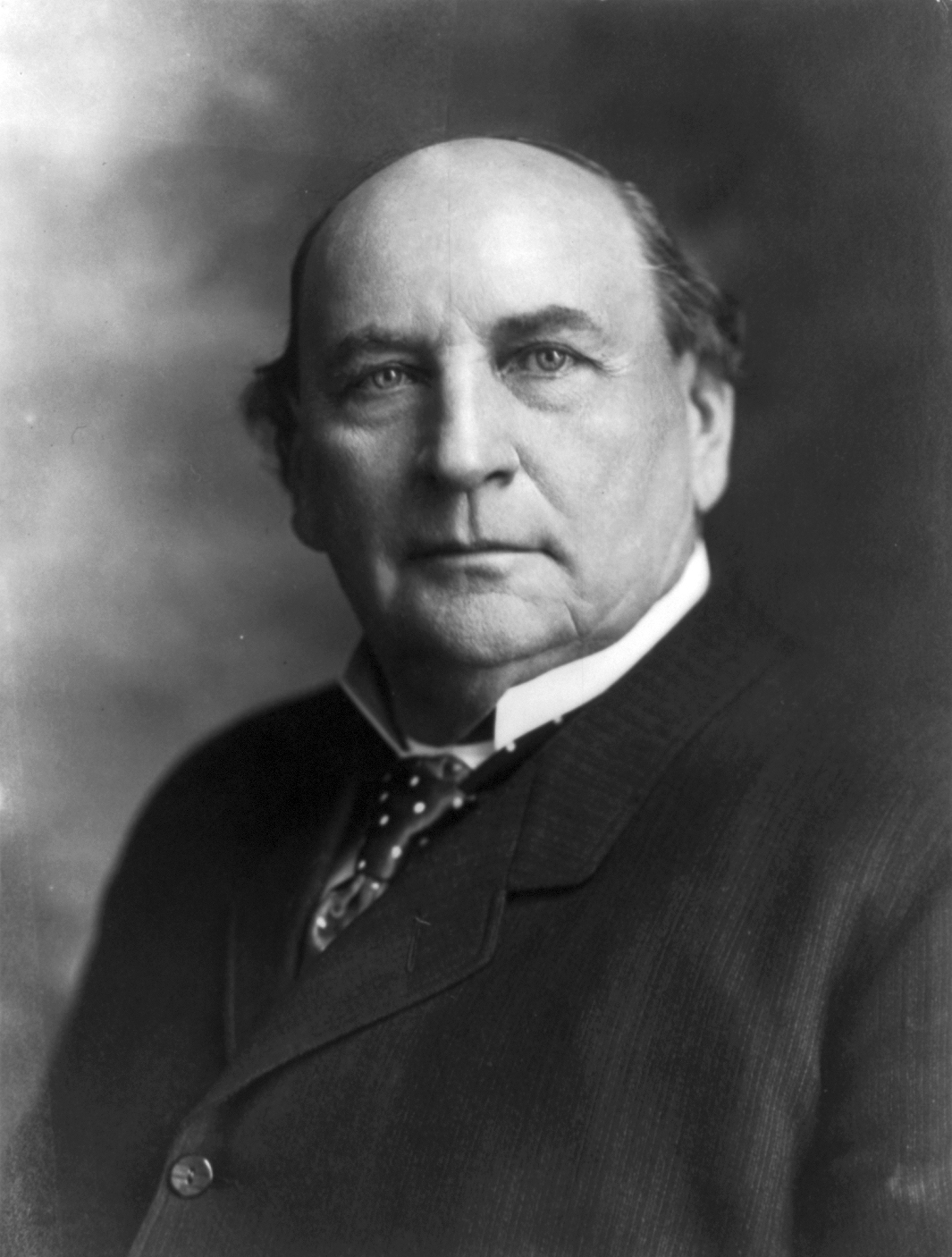
- Bankhead in 1910

United States Senator from Alabama
- In office June 18, 1907 – March 1, 1920
- Preceded by: John Tyler Morgan
- Succeeded by: B. B. Comer

Member of the U.S. House of Representatives from Alabama's 6th district
- In office March 4, 1887 – March 3, 1907
- Preceded by: John Mason Martin
- Succeeded by: Richmond P. Hobson

Member of the Alabama Senate
- In office 1876–1877

Member of the Alabama House of Representatives
- In office 1865–1867; 1880–1881

Personal details
- Born: John Hollis Bankhead; September 13, 1842 Moscow, Alabama, U.S.
- Died: March 1, 1920 (aged 77) Washington, D.C., U.S.
- Party: Democratic
- Spouse: Tallulah James Brockman
- Children: 5, including John and William
- Relatives: Walter W. Bankhead (grandson); Tallulah Bankhead (granddaughter)

John Hollis Bankhead (September 13, 1842 – March 1, 1920) was an American politician and Confederate Army soldier. A member of the Democratic Party, Bankhead served as U.S. Senator from the state of Alabama from 1907 until his death in 1920. Bankhead had additionally served in the United States House of Representatives, the Alabama Legislature, and as warden of the state penitentiary in Wetumpka.

== Early life and military service ==
Bankhead was born on September 13, 1842, at Moscow, present-day Lamar County, Alabama (near present-day Sulligent), the son of Susan Fleming (Hollis) and James Greer Bankhead. His great-grandfather, James Bankhead (1738–1799) was born in Ulster and settled in South Carolina.

He was educated in the common schools and served in the Confederate States Army, during the Civil War, rising to the rank of captain, in the Alabama 16th Infantry, Company K.

== Career ==
After the Civil War, Bankhead went on to serve as warden of the state penitentiary in Wetumpka. During this period, he was said to have taken part of the exploitation of inmates as cheap labor for industry as part of Alabama's convict-leasing system.

Bankhead was a member of the Alabama House of Representatives from 1865 to 1867, and again in 1880 and 1881. In 1876 and 1877 he was a member of the State Senate. He was elected to the United States House of Representatives in 1887, serving until 1907.

=== U.S. Senate ===
At age 65, John H. Bankhead was appointed, then elected, to serve out the remainder of the U.S. Senate term left by the death of John Tyler Morgan and later re-elected twice. He served from June 18, 1907, until his death in Washington on March 1, 1920.

Bankhead was a member of the Inland Waterways Commission in 1907, and was instrumental in enacting the Federal Aid Road Act of 1916, which became the first federal highway funding legislation. He was also a member of the Commission on Public Buildings and the Commission on Rivers and Harbors. He wrote several books relating to post roads.

Bankhead served as campaign manager for Oscar Underwood's 1912 presidential candidacy. During his Senate tenure, Bankhead opposed the Nineteenth Amendment to the United States Constitution, which mandated nationwide women's suffrage.

Following his death, B. B. Comer, a former governor of Alabama, was appointed to serve the rest of his term until November 2, 1920, when J. Thomas Heflin was elected to serve out the term.

== Personal life ==
He married Tallulah James Brockman. She was of Revolutionary ancestry, her father's great-grandfather, Benjamin Kilgore, having been a captain of a South Carolina company in the War of the Revolution. She was the daughter of James H. Brockman, a native of Greenville District, South Carolina.

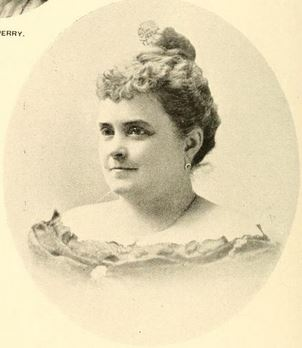
Tallulah James Brockman

Her education was received in the fashionable schools of Tuskegee and Montgomery, Alabama. Their two elder sons, John Hollis and William Brockman, were practicing lawyers. The youngest, Henry McAuley, was a student at the University of Alabama. The elder daughter, Louise, married Representative William Hayne Perry, of Greenville, South Carolina, son of former South Carolina governor Benjamin Franklin Perry and the younger, Marie Bankhead Owen, was the wife of Thomas McAdory Owen, a historian by profession.

=== Legacy ===
United States Senator John H. Bankhead II and Speaker of the House William Brockman Bankhead were his sons, and actress Tallulah Bankhead was his granddaughter. The cross-country Bankhead Highway was named after him, as is Bankhead Lake on the Black Warrior River near Birmingham. Also, the Bankhead Tunnel on US 98 in Mobile, Alabama, is named after him.

== See also ==
- Bankhead House (Jasper, Alabama)
- James Greer Bankhead House
- List of members of the United States Congress who died in office (1900–1949)

Party political offices
First	Democratic nominee for U.S. Senator from Alabama (Class 2); 1918	Succeeded by James Thomas Heflin
U.S. House of Representatives
Preceded by John Mason Martin	Member of the U.S. House of Representatives from Alabama's 6th congressional district 1887–1907	Succeeded by Richmond P. Hobson
U.S. Senate
Preceded by John Tyler Morgan	U.S. senator (Class 2) from Alabama; 1907–1920; Served alongside: Edmund Pettus, Joseph F. Johnston, Francis S. White and Oscar Underwood	Succeeded by Braxton B. Comer
