= Thomas Perkins Abernethy =

American historian (1890–1975)

- Born: August 25, 1890; Collirene, Alabama, U.S.
- Died: November 12, 1975 (aged 85); Charlottesville, Virginia, U.S.
- Resting place: University of Virginia Cemetery
- Occupations: Historian, civil servant
- Spouse: Ida Robertson Robertson

Signature
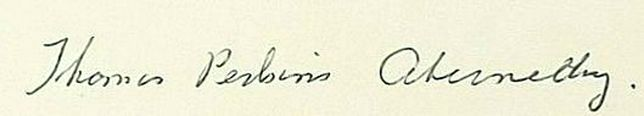

Thomas Perkins Abernethy (August 25, 1890 – November 12, 1975) was an American historian and academic. He served as a professor of early American history at a number of universities throughout the South and Southwest United States. He mainly taught early American colonial history that concentrated on southern states, their notable figures, frontier life, the move westward, and how it impacted the social, economic and political fabric of colonial America and its transition into an independent nation.

== Early life and education ==
Thomas Perkins Abernethy was born on August 25, 1890, in Collirene, Alabama. His parents were Thomas Hines Abernethy and Anne (Rast) Abernethy. He married Ida Erckman Robertson of Birmingham on December 6, 1917. Abernethy's father was a Confederate soldier. His great-grandfather, Thomas Smith Abernethy, was a pioneer Methodist minister and one of the founders of the Alabama conference.

Abernethy attended various public schools in Birmingham, Alabama, and graduated high school in 1905. He attended the agricultural school Sylacauga, then attended one year at Marion Military Institute, and became a cadet sergeant; he also played on the institution's football team.

Abernethy earned his associate degree at the College of Charleston in 1912. He then attended Harvard University and earned his master's degree in 1915 and his Ph.D. in 1922. Abernethy's work, The Formative period in Alabama, 1815–1828, published in 1922, was submitted as a doctoral dissertation to the faculty of Harvard University and was prepared under the direction of Professor Frederick Jackson Turner; the archives and manuscripts collected were made available by Thomas M. Owen, founder of the Alabama Department of Archives and History, (Note: Owen authored the four volume work, History of Alabama and Dictionary of Alabama Biography) which made the depth of Abernethy's research possible.

== Career ==
Upon completion of his graduate studies at Harvard, Abernethy began his career as a professor and historian of the southern colonies and states. He returned to the Marion Military Institute and taught there from 1912 to 1914. When World War I broke out, he set aside his teaching career and joined the U.S. Army. After the war he again returned to Marion Institute and taught there for another year in 1919. Abernethy continued his teaching career and taught at the Women's College of Alabama, from 1916 to 1917, at Vanderbilt University in 1921, at the University of Chattanooga from 1922 to 1928, at the University of Alabama from 1928 to 1930, at the University of Virginia as Richmond Alumni Professor of History from 1930 to 1961, at the University of Texas from 1961 to 1962, and at the University of Arizona from 1963 to 1964. Abernethy also contributed to numerous professional journals and anthologies. He was a member of the American Historical Society and Virginia Historical Society and founder and president of the Southern Historical Society and served as its third president. In 1947 he received a Litt. D. from Washington and Lee University and the Phi Beta Kappa Award for best historical work in 1961. He was also honored by a Festschrift titled The Old Dominion; Essays for Thomas Perkins Abernethy, edited by Darrett B. Rutman.

Abernethy co-founded the Southern Historical Association and served as its third president. He also served on the executive board of the Virginia Historical Society in Richmond for more than twenty-five years.

About 1970 Abernethy donated his private library, a collection of about 950 books, to the Marion Military Institute. His library included rare and first editions works, the oldest of which was printed in 1779, along with seven works written by Abernethy himself.

Abernethy died in Charlottesville, Virginia, on November 12, 1975. He is buried in University of Virginia Cemetery and Columbarium in Charlottesville.

=== Works ===
Abernethy's works include:

- The South in the New Nation, 1789-1819 (1961)
- Western Lands and the American Revolution (1937)
- The Burr Conspiracy (1954)
- Three Virginia Frontiers (1940)
- Historical Sketches of the University of Virginia (1937, Appleton Century)
- From Frontier To Plantation In Tennessee, A Study in Frontier Democracy (1932)
- The Formative Period in Alabama, 1815–1828 (1922)

== See also ==
- Charles Henry Ambler – specialized in frontier history, and a contemporary of Thomas Abernethy
- History of Alabama
- History of Virginia
- James Kendall Hosmer - American historian and librarian

== Sources ==
- "Abernethy, Thomas Perkins, 1890–1975". The University of Alabama, University Libraries.
- Abernethy, Thomas Perkins (1922). The formative period in Alabama, 1815–1828. Montgomery, Alabama, The Brown printing company.
- —— (1961). The South in the New Nation, 1789–1819. Louisiana State University Press. ISBN 978-0-8071-0004-2.
- Bybee, Dennia L. "Thomas Perkins Abernethy". Virginia History Series.
- Causey, Donna R. "Biography: Dr. Thomas Perkins Abernethy born August 25, 1890". Alabama Pioneers.
- "History of Alabama and Dictionary of Alabama Biography". Alabama Department of Archives and History.
- Monroe, Alden (2003). "Thomas Owen and the Founding of the Alabama Department of Archives and History". Provenance, Journal of the Society of Georgia Archivists. 21 (1). Alabama Department of Archives and History.
