= 1st Alabama Infantry Regiment =

Infantry regiment of the Confederate States Army

- Active: 1861–1865
- Country: Confederate States of America
- Branch: Confederate States Army
- Type: Infantry
- Engagements: American Civil War

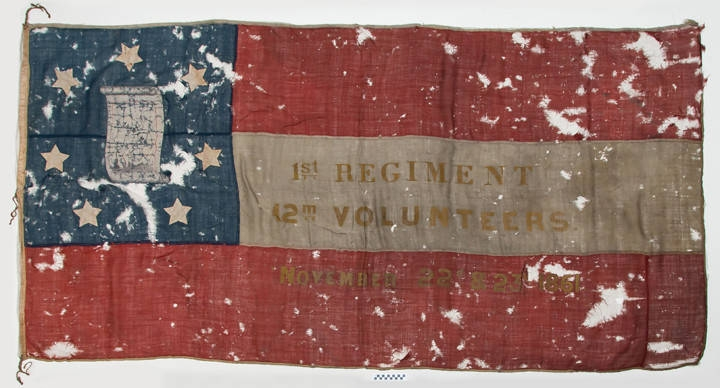
1st Alabama Infantry flag

The 1st Alabama Infantry Regiment was a Confederate volunteer infantry unit from the state of Alabama during the American Civil War.

== Organization ==
The 1st Alabama Infantry Regiment completed its organization at Pensacola, Florida about the 1st of April 1, 1861 by the election of regimental officers. The soldiers were from the counties of Tallapoosa, Pike, Lowndes, Wilcox, Talladega, Barbour, and Macon.

== History ==
For a year the regiment staffed the batteries at Pensacola, then moved to Missouri with 1,000 soldiers, where all but a detachment were captured at the Battle of Island Number Ten. The prisoners were exchanged during September, 1862, and it was soon ordered to Port Hudson. Here the unit endured many hardships, and on July 9, 1863 nearly 500 soldiers were captured.

Exchanged and reorganized with 610 effectives, the 1st joined the Army of Tennessee and served in General Quarles' and Shelley's Brigade. It took an active part in the Atlanta and Tennessee Campaigns, and ended the war in North Carolina. Its casualties were high at Peach Tree Creek and were again heavy at Franklin and Nashville. Less than 100 had surrendered by April, 1865. One of their companies, Company D, was also known as Perote Guards.

== Field Officers ==
The field officers were Colonels Henry D. Clayton and I. G. W. Steedman, Lieutenant Colonel Michael B. Locke, and Majors S. L. Knox and Jere N. Williams.

== See also ==
- List of Confederate units from Alabama
