= Alabama Historical Society =

Organization for preserving the history of Alabama

The Alabama Historical Society in the state of Alabama, United States, formed in 1850 and was incorporated in 1852. Founders included James F. Sulzby, Alexander Bowie, Joshua H. Foster, E.D. King, Basil Manly Sr., Washington Moody, and Albert J. Pickett. It was based in Tuscaloosa. Activities ceased by 1905.

== See also ==
- Alabama Department of Archives and History (est. 1901), government agency
- Alabama Historical Association (est. 1947)
- Alabama Historical Commission (est. 1966), government agency

== Bibliography ==
- Transactions of the Alabama Historical Society, Tuscaloosa, pp. 2 v. in 1 – via HathiTrust. 1852- . (Also here)
- Appleton Prentiss Clark Griffin (1895). "State Historical Societies: Alabama". Bibliography of American Historical Societies. Annual Report. American Historical Association. 1896 reprint
