= Louise Clarke Pyrnelle =

American writer (1850–1907)

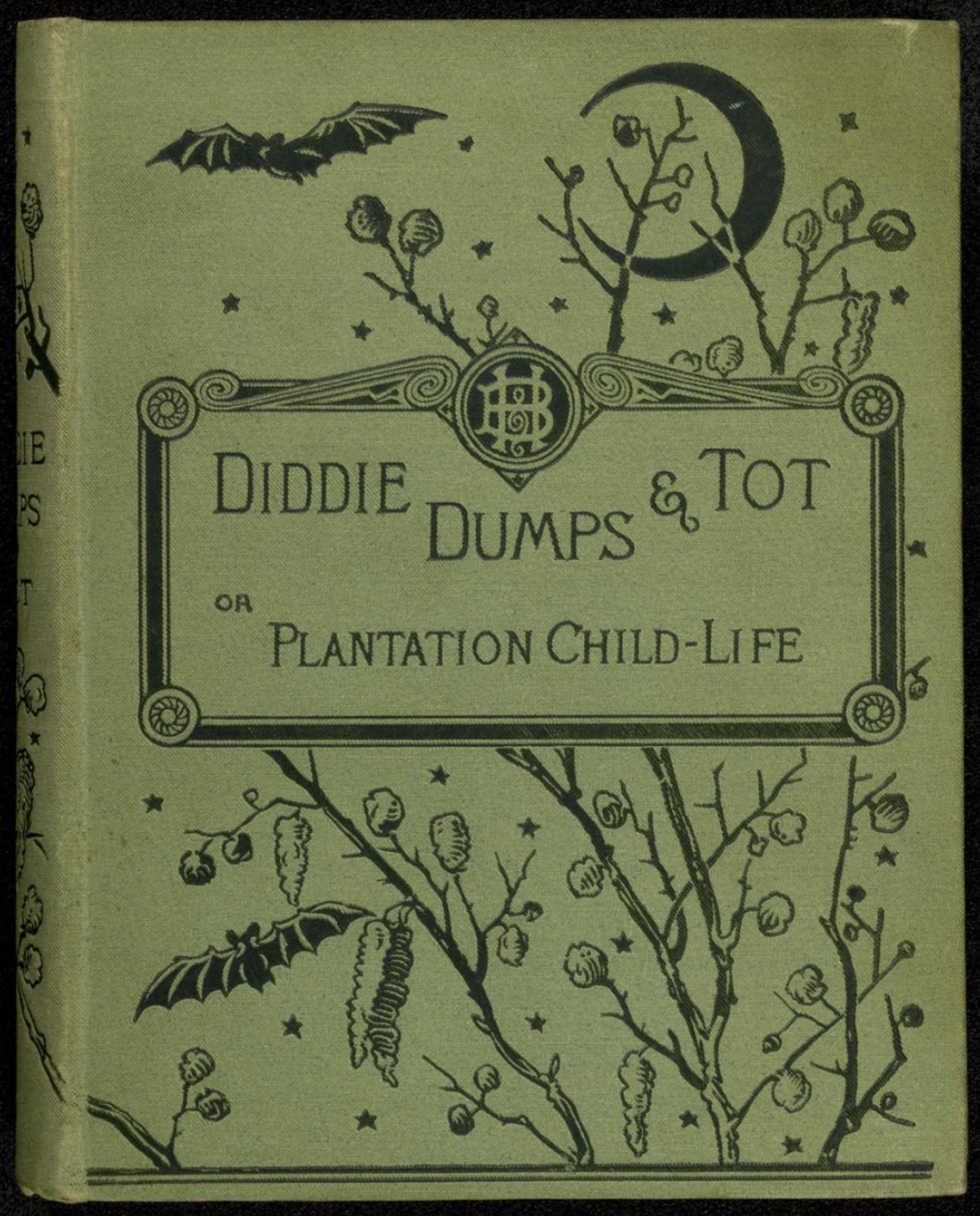
- Born: Elizabeth Louise Clarke; June 19, 1850; Perry County, Alabama, U.S.
- Died: August 26, 1907 (aged 57); Birmingham, Alabama, U.S.
- Resting place: Old Live Oak Cemetery, Selma, Alabama, U.S.
- Other names: Elizabeth Louise Clarke Parnell, Louise Clarke "Pyrnelle" Parnell
- Occupation: Writer
- Spouse: John Parnell (m. 1880–)

Louise Clarke Pyrnelle (née Elizabeth Louise Clarke; June 19, 1850 – August 26, 1907) was an American writer in Alabama. Her works drew heavily from her childhood experiences growing up on an antebellum plantation.

== Life ==
Pyrnelle was born Elizabeth Louise Clarke on Itta-Bena Plantation, a cotton plantation near Uniontown, in Perry County, Alabama. Her parents were Elizabeth Carson (née Bates) and Dr. Richard Clarke. Her father served in the Confederate States Army during the Civil War in the 4th Alabama Infantry Regiment. After the Civil War, the family lost the plantation and moved to Selma, Alabama, where her father opened a medical practice.

She was educated in elocution and lecturing in New York at Anne Randall–Diehl's College of Education and at the Mme. Alberti's Delsarte School, and worked as a governess and public speaker.

In 1880, she married John Parnell. After their marriage the couple travelled around Alabama and Florida tutoring and working for the Episcopal Church. During this era, married women could not work as teachers in the American South.

Her novel Diddie, Dumps & Tot; or Plantation Child-Life was published in 1882 under the pseudonym "Pyrnelle" – a slight variation on her husband's name. She would publish only one other work during her lifetime: a story called "Aunt Flora's Courtship and Marriage", however her first novel would be the one to gain her fame and recognition.

She died in 1907, in Birmingham, Alabama, and was buried at Live Oak Cemetery in Selma, Alabama.

== Works ==
=== Diddie, Dumps & Tot; or Plantation Child-life (1882) ===
Diddie, Dumps & Tot; or Plantation Child-life was a children's book noted at the time for its use of the southern black vernacular, a dialect also used by Mark Twain and Joel Chandler Harris, and which was thought to add "authenticity" to writing about the American South. The novel offered a nostalgic and romanticized view of antebellum plantation life and slavery, and was popular during the 19th and 20th centuries.

=== Aunt Flora's Courtship and Marriage (1906) ===
The Aunt Flora's Courtship and Marriage (1906) was about a woman enslaved on a plantation, who wishes for a husband. Later in the book she marries.

=== Miss Li'l' Tweetty (1917) ===
This posthumously published many years after Pyrnelle's death, the Miss Li'l' Tweetty novel describes the childhood experiences of a young girl named 'Tweetty' and employed a black dialect. Like Diddie, Dumps & Tot, its depictions of slavery were uncritical and nostalgic.
