= Alabama Department of Archives and History =

Repository of Alabama archival records

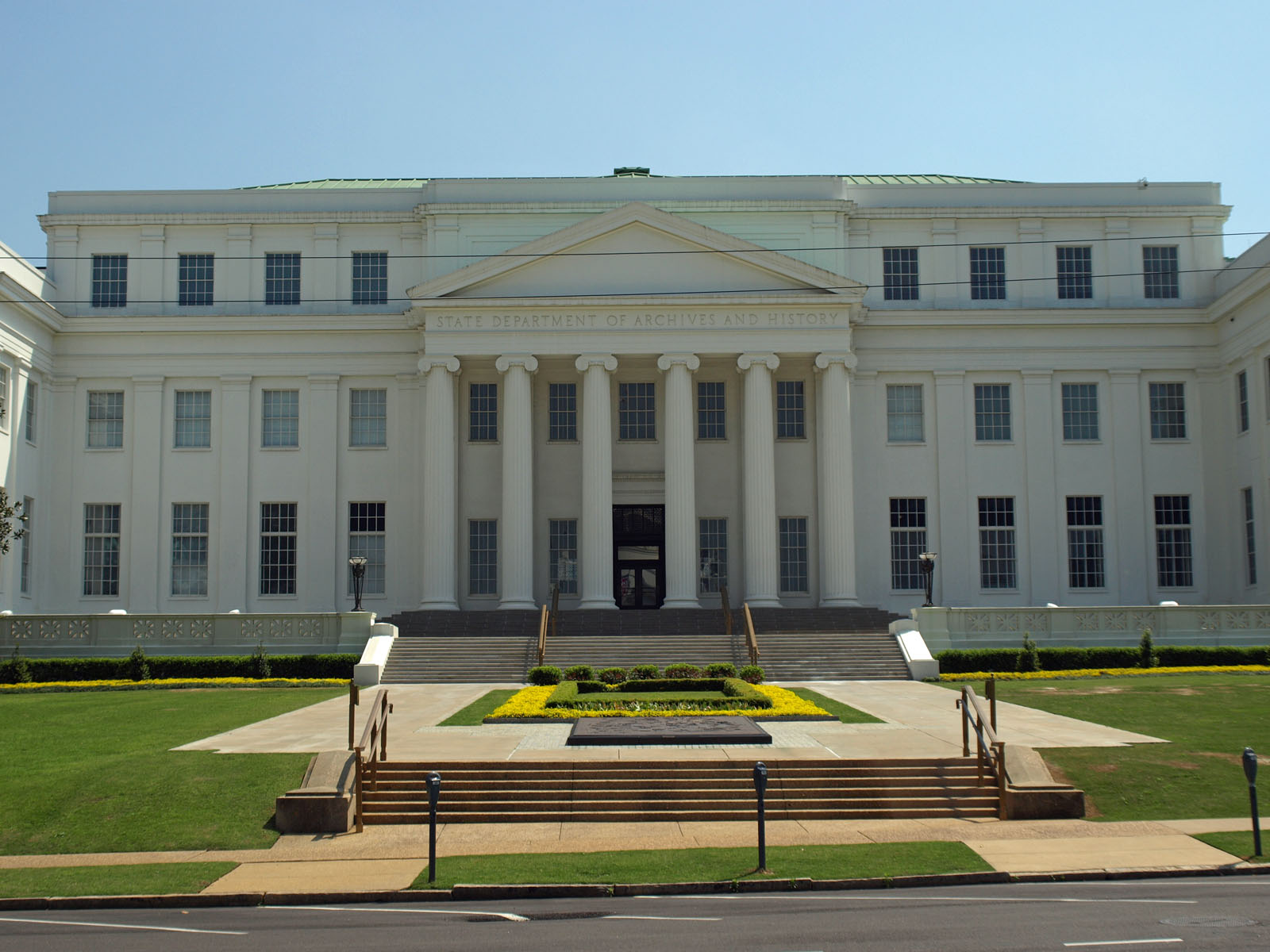
- Central block of the archives building
- Formation: 1901
- Type: Government organization
- Purpose: Archive
- Headquarters: 624 Washington Avenue; Montgomery, Alabama
- Coordinates: 32°22′32″N 86°18′1″W
- Region served: Alabama
- Director: Steve Murray
- Website: www.archives.alabama.gov

The Alabama Department of Archives and History is the official repository of archival records for the U.S. state of Alabama. Under the direction of Thomas M. Owen its founder, the agency received state funding by an act of the Alabama Legislature on February 27, 1901. Its primary mission is the collecting and preserving of archives, documents and artifacts relating to the history of the state. It was the first publicly funded, independent state archives agency in the United States. It subsequently became a model for the establishment of archives in other states. Today the agency identifies, preserves, and makes accessible records and artifacts significant to the history of the state and serves as the official repository for records created by Alabama's state agencies.

== The building and collections ==
The Department of Archives and History was housed in the old Senate cloak room at the Alabama State Capitol after its establishment in 1901. It was then moved to the Capitol's new south wing upon its completion in 1906. A separate building was first conceived of 1918 by Thomas McAdory Owen, the first director of the Archives. However, funding did not become available until the 1930s, when the next director, Marie Bankhead Owen (wife of Thomas), was able to secure the necessary capital from the Works Progress Administration.

The three-story Neoclassical building was built from 1938 to 1940. An east wing was completed in 1970 and a west one in 2005. The west wing added 60,000 square feet (5,574 m^{2}) of new space to the building. The original Washington Avenue bronze entrance doors to the building were designed by artist Nathan Glick. They depict eight scenes from Alabama's history. Following many years of wear they were relocated to the Ocllo S. Malone Lobby in the new west wing. The first and second floors of the Archives building feature walls clad in white Alabama marble.

The first floor contains the original Washington Avenue entrance lobby, which features a coffered ceiling with gilt moldings and ceiling medallions. Other features of the first floor are the Statuary Hall, the Research Room, several auditoriums, a gift shop, and the Ocllo Malone Lobby.

=== Museum of Alabama ===
The second and third floors contain the Museum of Alabama. Portraits of people who contributed to the history of the state are hung in various locations on both of these floors. The second floor contains exhibits featuring the Selma to Montgomery marches, the history of Native Americans in the state from the Pre-Columbian era to the Indian removal, and the history of warfare involving Alabamians from the French Colonial period to the Vietnam War. The Alabama Sampler Gallery contains Alabama-related artifacts ranging from 19th century clothing to a guitar owned by Hank Williams. The Hands-On Gallery contains history-related activities for children. The third floor houses paintings and sculpture.

=== Native American Repatriation ===
Repatriation of Native American human remains and items from burial sites, as required by federal law, was approved by the board of trustees in 2022.

== Directors ==
The department has had six directors since its inception. Thomas McAdory Owen served from 1901 until he died in 1920. He was succeeded by Marie Bankhead Owen, his wife, who served until her retirement in 1955. Peter A. Brannon was director from 1955 to 1967, followed by Milo Howard. Howard served until Edwin Bridges took over in 1982. Bridges served until his retirement in 2012. His successor, Steve Murray, was named in August 2012.

== See also ==
- Thomas Perkins Abernethy – Preeminent historian on Alabama
- Government of Alabama

== Bibliography ==
- Simpson, Robert R. "The Origin of the Alabama Department of Archives and History." Alabama. Historical Quarterly 34, no. 2 (Summer 1972)
