= William B. Bankhead =

American politician (1874–1940)

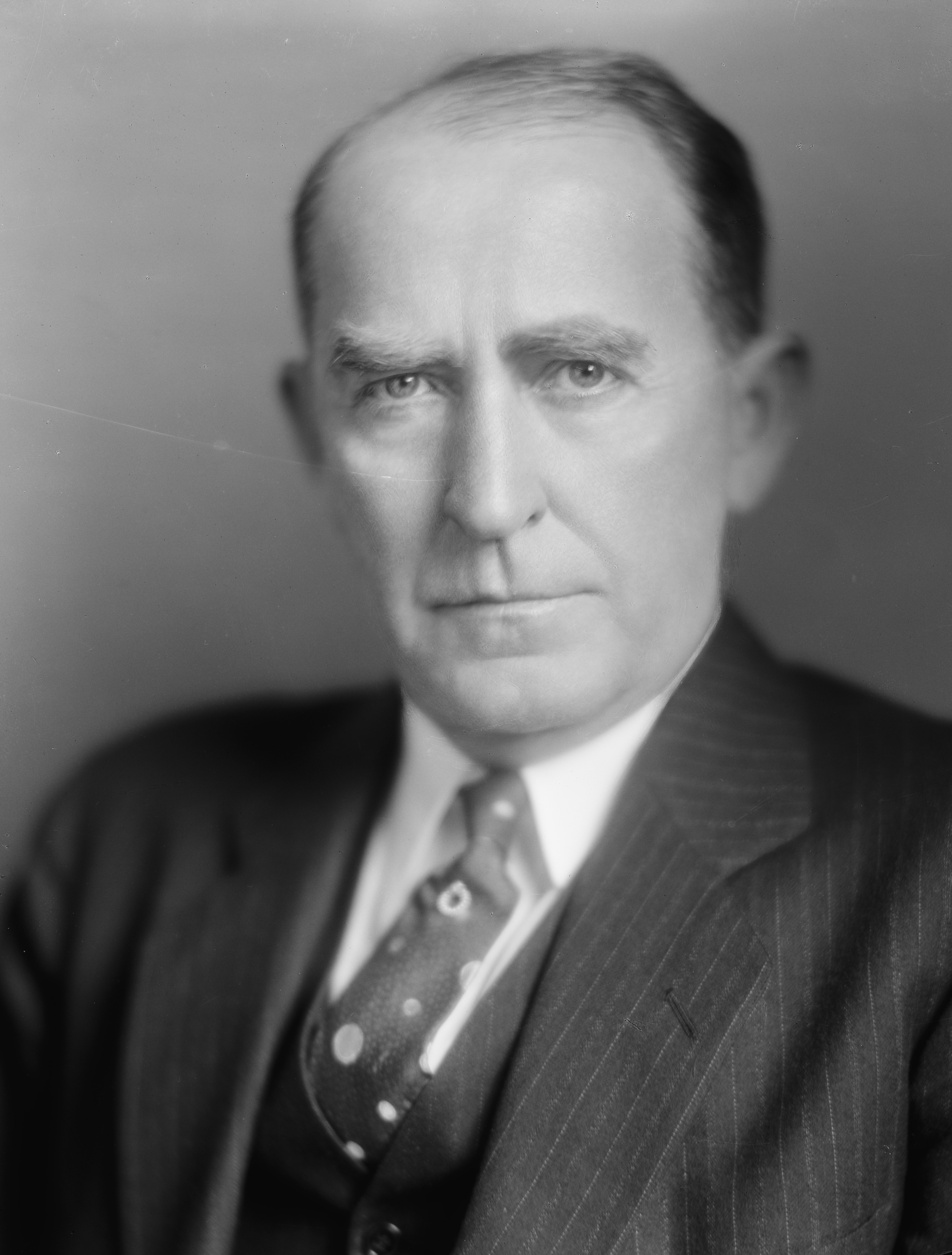
- Bankhead, c. 1917–1940

42nd Speaker of the United States House of Representatives
- In office June 4, 1936 – September 15, 1940
- Preceded by: Jo Byrns
- Succeeded by: Sam Rayburn

Leader of the House Democratic Caucus
- In office June 4, 1936 – September 15, 1940
- Preceded by: Jo Byrns
- Succeeded by: Sam Rayburn

House Majority Leader
- In office January 3, 1935 – June 4, 1936
- Deputy: Patrick J. Boland
- Preceded by: Jo Byrns
- Succeeded by: Sam Rayburn

Chair of the House Rules Committee
- In office April 1, 1934 – January 3, 1935
- Preceded by: Edward W. Pou
- Succeeded by: John J. O'Connor

Member of the U.S. House of Representatives from Alabama
- In office March 4, 1917 – September 15, 1940
- Preceded by: Constituency established
- Succeeded by: Zadoc L. Weatherford
- Constituency: 10th district (1917–1933); 7th district (1933–1940)

Member of the Alabama House of Representatives
- In office 1900–1901

City Attorney of Huntsville
- In office 1898–1902

Personal details
- Born: William Brockman Bankhead; April 12, 1874 Sulligent, Alabama, U.S.
- Died: September 15, 1940 (aged 66) Washington, D.C., U.S.
- Party: Democratic
- Spouses: Adalaide Eugenia Sledge (m. 1900; died 1902) Florence McGuire (m. 1915)
- Children: 2, including Tallulah
- Parent: John H. Bankhead (father)
- Relatives: John H. Bankhead II (brother); Walter W. Bankhead (nephew)
- Education: University of Alabama (BA); Georgetown University (LLB)

William Brockman Bankhead (April 12, 1874 – September 15, 1940) was an American politician who served as the 42nd speaker of the United States House of Representatives from 1936 to 1940, representing Alabama's 10th and later 7th congressional districts as a Democrat from 1917 to 1940. Bankhead was a strong liberal and a prominent supporter of President Franklin Roosevelt's New Deal of pro-labor union legislation, thus clashing with most other Southern Democrats in Congress at the time. Bankhead described himself as proud to be a politician, by which he meant that he did not neglect matters that concerned his district or reelection. He was the father of actress Tallulah Bankhead.

Bankhead died on September 15, 1940, from an abdominal hemorrhage, while still in office.

== Early life ==
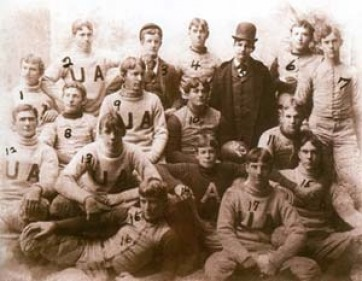
William Bankhead (#9) with the 1892 Alabama football team

Bankhead was born at the Bankhead plantation in Lamar County, Alabama. His father, John H. Bankhead, was an active politician who had served in the Alabama legislature, and later as U.S. Representative and Senator. His mother was Tallulah James Brockman, granddaughter of South Carolina state Senator Thomas Patterson Brockman, and he was raised as a Methodist. Bankhead's brother, John H. Bankhead II, also served in the Senate.

William Bankhead attended the University of Alabama, where he was a member of Phi Delta Theta fraternity, and played on the university's first football team, organized in 1892. He studied law at Georgetown University Law Center in Washington, D.C., graduating in 1895.

He was immediately admitted to the bar in Alabama, and practiced law in Huntsville.

== Political career ==
In 1898, he became city attorney of Huntsville, serving until 1902. In 1900, he was elected to the Alabama House of Representatives for one term, serving through 1901.

In 1905, he moved to Jasper, Alabama. In 1910 he was appointed solicitor of the fourteenth judicial circuit of Alabama, serving until 1914.

In 1914, he sought the Democratic nomination for US Representative, but failed. In 1916 he was elected Representative from the newly created 10th Congressional District. (Alabama was apportioned a tenth Congressional seat after the 1910 census, but the seat was filled by at-large election in 1912 and 1914.) Bankhead held the 10th District until it was abolished after the 1930 census, when Alabama lost a seat. He was the only person ever elected from the 10th District.

After reapportionment and redistricting following the 1930 census, Bankhead was re-elected Representative from the 7th District in 1932, and was re-elected three times, serving until his death in 1940. Bankhead served as chairman of the House Rules Committee from April 1934 until January 1935, taking over for Edward W. Pou who died in office. In 1934, he was chosen House Majority Leader by his fellow Democrats. On June 4, 1936, he was chosen Speaker of the House to succeed Jo Byrns, who had died that morning. Bankhead served as Speaker until his death on September 15, 1940. His cause of death was a stomach hemorrhage.

As Speaker, Bankhead held the second-highest political office ever attained by any Alabamian, after only Vice President William R. King.

At the 1940 Democratic National Convention (three months before his death), he finished second to Henry A. Wallace on the vice presidential ticket, losing the delegate count 626–329.

== Bankhead family ==
Bankhead's father, John H. Bankhead, was a U.S. representative and senator. His elder brother John H. Bankhead II was also a U.S. senator, and his nephew Walter Will Bankhead was a U.S. representative. His daughter, Tallulah Bankhead, was the acclaimed theatrical, radio and motion-picture actress.

The William B. Bankhead National Forest and sections of old U.S. Highway 78 in northern Alabama are named in his honor. His home in Jasper has been renovated to house the Walker Area Community Foundation's "Bankhead House and Heritage Center", a history museum and arts venue.

== See also ==
- List of members of the United States Congress who died in office (1900–1949)

U.S. House of Representatives
New constituency	Member of the U.S. House of Representatives from Alabama's 10th congressional district 1917–1933	Constituency abolished
Preceded by Miles C. Allgood	Member of the U.S. House of Representatives from Alabama's 7th congressional district 1933–1940	Succeeded by Zadoc L. Weatherford
Preceded by Jo Byrns	House Majority Leader; 1935–1936	Succeeded by Sam Rayburn
Party political offices
Preceded by Jo Byrns	House Democratic Deputy Leader; 1935–1936	Succeeded by Sam Rayburn
Preceded by Alben W. Barkley; Joseph Taylor Robinson	Keynote Speaker of the Democratic National Convention; 1940	Succeeded by Robert S. Kerr
Political offices
Preceded by Jo Byrns	Speaker of the U.S. House of Representatives; 1936–1940	Succeeded by Sam Rayburn
