= The Far Side of Paradise =

1951 biography of F. Scott Fitzgerald

- First US edition (1951)
- Author: Arthur Mizener
- Language: English
- Subject: F. Scott Fitzgerald
- Genre: Biography
- Published: January 1, 1951
- Publisher: Houghton Mifflin (United States), Eyre & Spottiswoode (United Kingdom)
- Publication place: United States
- Media type: Print (hardcover & paperback)
- Awards: 1952 National Book Award for Nonfiction (Finalist)

The Far Side of Paradise: A Biography of F. Scott Fitzgerald is a 1951 work by Arthur Mizener. Published by Houghton Mifflin, it was the first published biography of American writer F. Scott Fitzgerald and renewed public interest in the author. It dealt frankly with Scott's alcoholism and depression as well as his wife Zelda Sayre's schizophrenia, including her suicidal and homicidal tendencies. The title alludes to Fitzgerald's 1920 debut novel, This Side of Paradise, that launched him to fame.

In this landmark biography, Mizener first proposed the now popular interpretations of Fitzgerald's magnum opus, The Great Gatsby, as a criticism of the American Dream and the titular character of Jay Gatsby as the dream's false prophet. In subsequent decades, he popularized these interpretations in a series of talks titled "The Great Gatsby and the American Dream." These interpretations of the novel are now often taught in high school and college classrooms without accreditation to Mizener.

Although Mizener's biography became a commercial success, Fitzgerald's friends, such as literary critic Edmund Wilson and others, believed the work distorted Scott and Zelda Fitzgerald's relationship and personalities for the worse. "Arthur Mizener had never known Fitzgerald," Wilson publicly wrote, "and did not in certain respects perhaps very well understand him." Scholars deemed Andrew Turnbull's 1962 biography Scott Fitzgerald to be a significant correction of the biographical record.

== Publication history ==
The biography was published in two significant editions. The first edition was published in 1951, while the second edition was published in 1965. In the second edition, Mizener notes that "a good deal of published and of unpublished information about Fitzgerald has accumulated" since the 1951 edition. This resulted in Mizener having to rewrite the 'last two chapters' of the book in order to include the story of Fitzgerald's relationship with columnist Sheilah Graham, after the publication of Graham's 1958 memoir Beloved Infidel, and to "include all the new information... published and unpublished, that is now available to me".

== Contents and themes ==
In the biography, Mizener became the first scholar to interpret Fitzgerald's novel The Great Gatsby in the context of the American Dream. "The last two pages of the book," Mizener wrote, "make overt Gatsby's embodiment of the American Dream as a whole by identifying his attitude with the awe of the Dutch sailors" when first glimpsing the New World. He noted Fitzgerald emphasized the dream's unreality and viewed the dream as "ridiculous." Mizener popularized his interpretations of the novel in a series of talks titled "The Great Gatsby and the American Dream."

== Reception and criticism ==
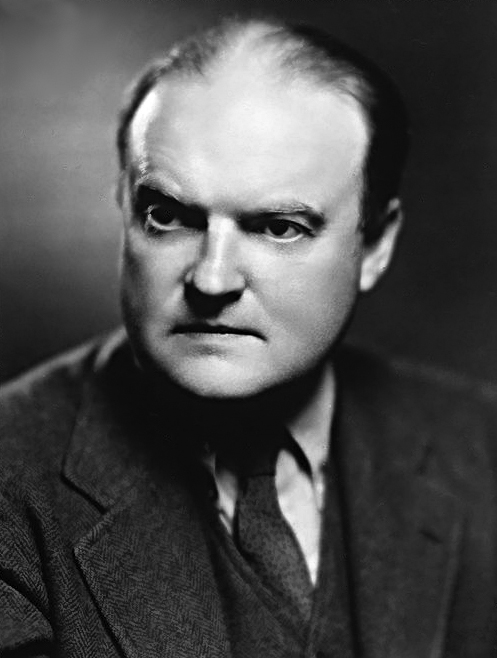
Fitzgerald's friend and literary critic Edmund Wilson argued that Arthur Mizener's biography distorted Scott and Zelda's relationship and personalities.

Although the biography proved a commercial success and increased Fitzgerald's posthumous fame, Fitzgerald's friends such as critic Edmund Wilson argued that the book distorted Scott and Zelda's relationship and personalities for the worse. Wilson had originally approached Mizener to write the biography. Throughout 1949 and 1950, Wilson supplied Mizener with biographical information about the Fitzgeralds, and he proofread Mizener's manuscript. When Wilson read the manuscript, he expressed dismay at how much the work mischaracterized the couple.

Wilson's criticism of Mizener's work not only highlights flaws in the biography—flaws which later contributed to the enduring legends about Fitzgerald—but also partly explains the appeal of Scott and Zelda Fitzgerald during the peak of their charm in the Jazz Age. On February 24, 1950, Wilson wrote to Christian Gauss, a Professor of French Literature at Princeton and Fitzgerald's former mentor:

I have just read the whole of the manuscript of Arthur Mizener's book on Scott and am very much worried about it. He has assembled in a spirit absolutely ghoulish everything discreditable or humiliating that ever happened to Scott. He has distorted the anecdotes that people have told him in such a way as to put Scott and Zelda in the worst possible light, and he has sometimes taken literally the jokes and nonsense that Scott was always giving off in letters and conversation and representing them as sinister realities. On the other hand, he gives no sense at all of the Fitzgeralds in the days when they were soaring—when Scott was successful and Zelda enchanting. Of course, Mizener is under a disadvantage in not having known them or their period, but his book is a disconcerting revelation of his own rather sour personality.

Wilson later explicitly criticized the manuscript in a letter to Arthur Mizener on March 3, 1950:

It is true that you have the advantage of not having known the Fitzgeralds or seen anything of the gaiety of the Twenties, whereas you must have a first-hand impression of the desperate hangover of the Thirties. But you can’t really tell the story without somehow doing justice to the exhilaration of the days when Scott was successful and Zelda at her most enchanting.... The remarkable thing about the Fitzgeralds was their capacity for carrying things off and carrying people away by their spontaneity, charm, and good-looks. They had a genius for imaginative improvisations of which they were never quite deprived of even in their later misfortunes.

Several years after the biography's publication in 1951, Wilson wrote in The New Yorker in January 1959 that "Arthur Mizener had never known Fitzgerald, and did not in certain respects perhaps very well understand him." Despite Wilson's criticisms of Mizener's distortions, Fitzgerald's acquaintance Budd Schulberg commented that Mizener's biography made "credible the almost incredible life of a man who had the world at his feet when he was 25 and at his throat when he was 40."

== See also ==
- Andrew W. Turnbull, Fitzgerald's second biographer and close friend
- Matthew J. Bruccoli, Fitzgerald biographer and friend of Scottie Fitzgerald
