= Zelda Fitzgerald =

American writer (1900–1948)

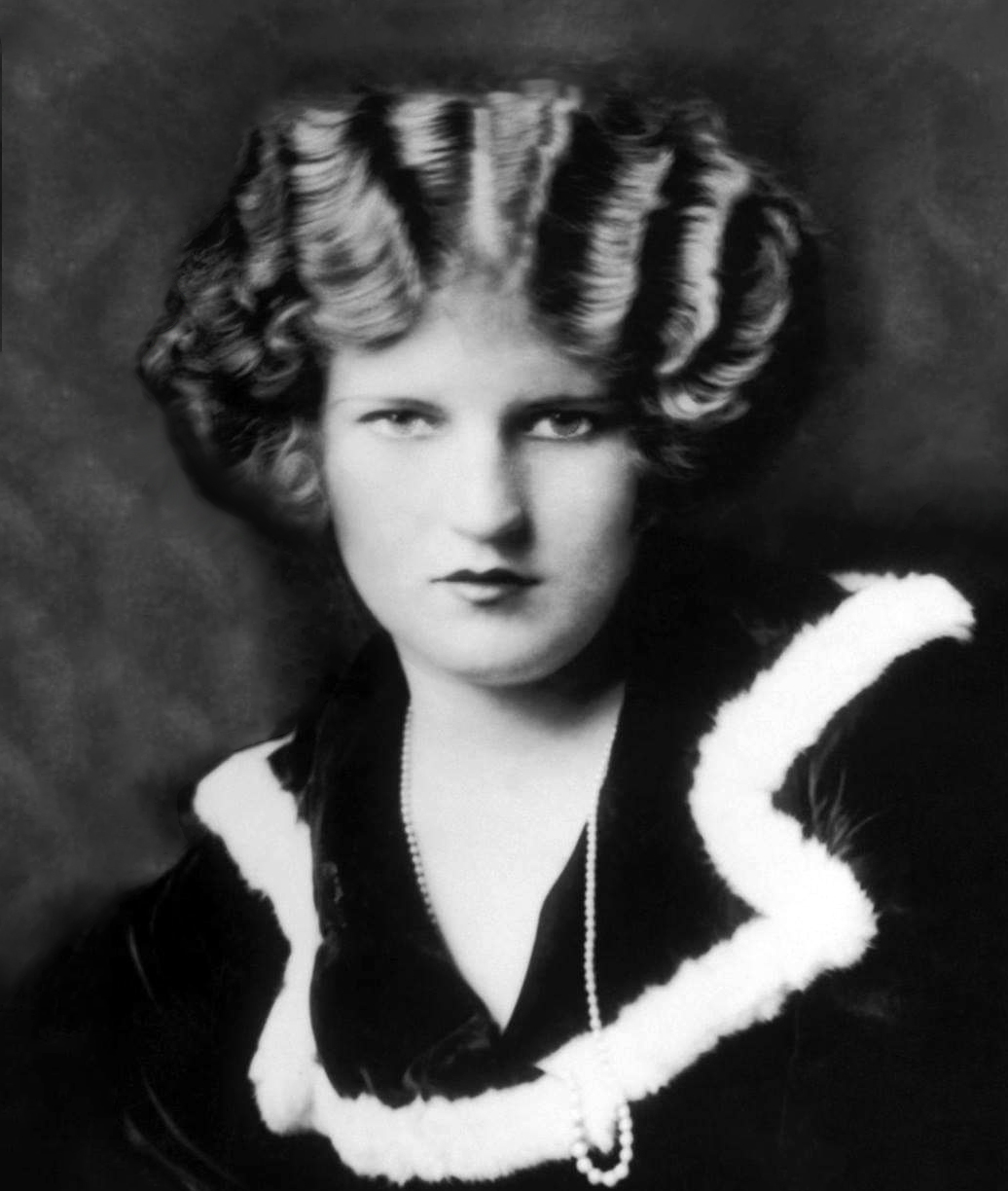
- Fitzgerald in 1923
- Born: Zelda Sayre; July 24, 1900; Montgomery, Alabama, U.S.
- Died: March 10, 1948 (aged 47); Asheville, North Carolina, U.S.
- Occupations: Novelist; short story writer; painter; socialite
- Spouse: F. Scott Fitzgerald (m. 1920; died 1940)
- Children: Frances Scott Fitzgerald
- Relatives: Anthony D. Sayre (father)
- Writing career
- Period: 1920–1948

Zelda Fitzgerald (née Sayre; July 24, 1900 – March 10, 1948) was an American novelist, painter, writer, and socialite. Born in Montgomery, Alabama, to a wealthy Southern family, she became locally famous for her beauty and high spirits. In 1920, she married writer F. Scott Fitzgerald after the popular success of his debut novel, This Side of Paradise. The novel catapulted the young couple into the public eye, and she became known in the national press as the first American flapper. Because of their wild antics and incessant partying, she and her husband became regarded in the newspapers as the enfants terribles of the Jazz Age. Alleged infidelity and bitter recriminations soon undermined their marriage. After Zelda traveled abroad to Europe, her mental health deteriorated, and she had suicidal and homicidal tendencies, which required psychiatric care. (Note: During a drive along the mountainous roads of the Côte d'Azur in France, Zelda seized the steering wheel and tried to kill herself, her husband, and their 9-year-old daughter Scottie by driving over a cliff.) Her doctors diagnosed her with schizophrenia, although later posthumous diagnoses posit bipolar disorder.

While institutionalized at Johns Hopkins Hospital in Baltimore, Maryland, she authored the 1932 novel Save Me the Waltz, a semi-autobiographical account of her early life in the American South during the Jim Crow era and her marriage to F. Scott Fitzgerald. Upon its publication by Scribner's, the novel garnered mostly negative reviews and experienced poor sales. The critical and commercial failure of Save Me the Waltz disappointed Zelda and led her to pursue her other interests as a playwright and a painter. In the fall of 1932, she completed a stage play titled Scandalabra, but Broadway producers unanimously declined to produce it. Disheartened, Zelda next attempted to paint watercolors, but, when her husband arranged their exhibition in 1934, the critical response proved equally disappointing.

While the two lived apart, Scott died of occlusive coronary arteriosclerosis in December 1940. After her husband's death, she attempted to write a second novel, Caesar's Things, but her recurrent voluntary institutionalization for mental illness interrupted her writing, and she failed to complete the work. By this time, she had undergone over ten years of electroshock therapy and insulin shock treatments, and she suffered from severe memory loss. In March 1948, while sedated and locked in a room on the fifth floor of Highland Hospital in Asheville, North Carolina, she died in a fire. Her body was identified by her dental records and one of her slippers. A follow-up investigation raised the possibility that the fire had been a work of arson by a disgruntled or mentally disturbed hospital employee.

A 1970 biography by Nancy Milford was a finalist for the National Book Award. After the success of Milford's biography, scholars viewed Zelda's artistic output in a new light. Her novel Save Me the Waltz became the focus of literary studies exploring different facets of the work: how her novel contrasted with Scott's depiction of their marriage in Tender Is the Night and how 1920s consumer culture placed mental stress on modern women. Concurrently, renewed interest began in Zelda's artwork, and her paintings were posthumously exhibited in the United States and Europe. In 1992, she was inducted into the Alabama Women's Hall of Fame.

== Early life and family background ==
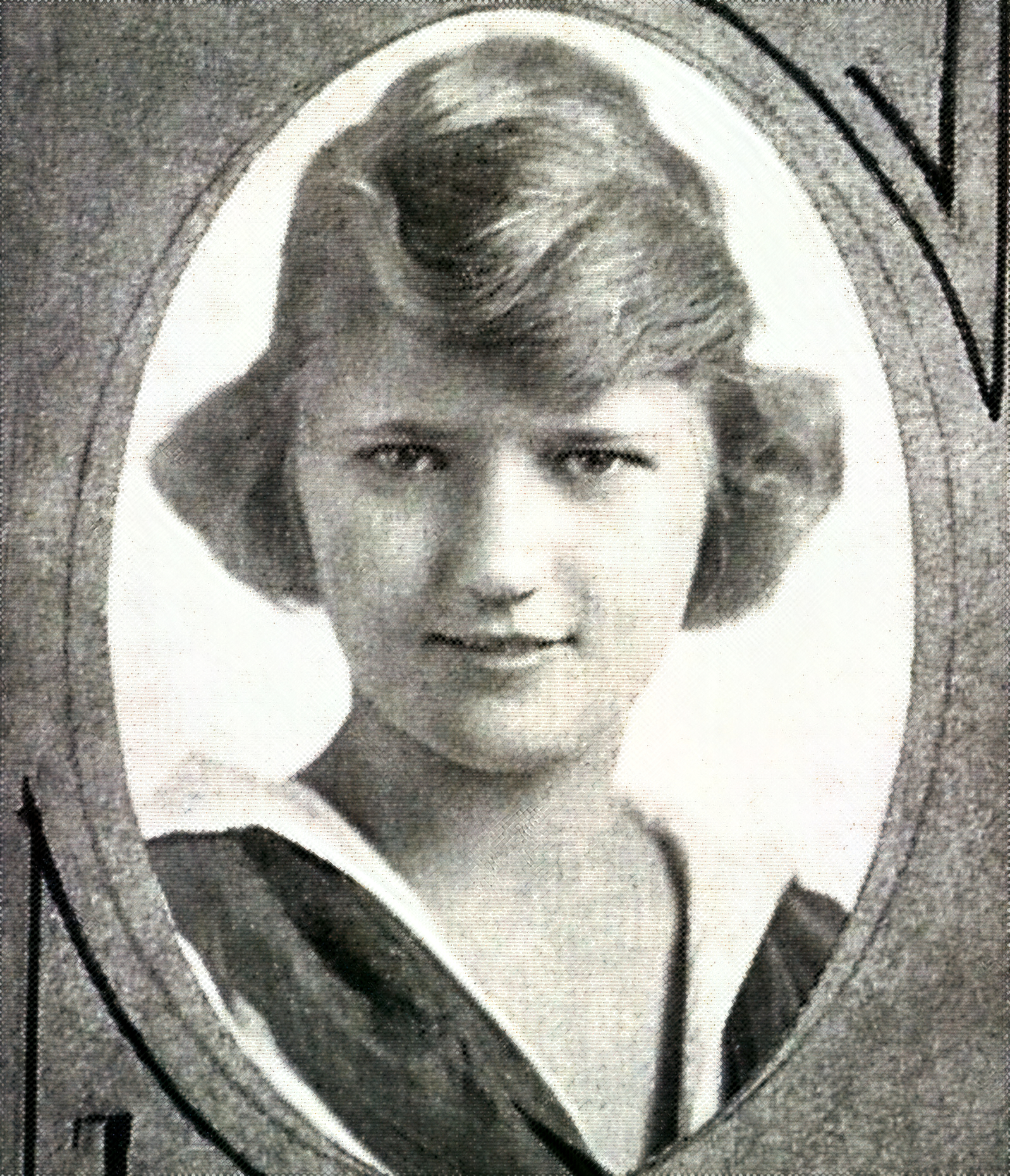
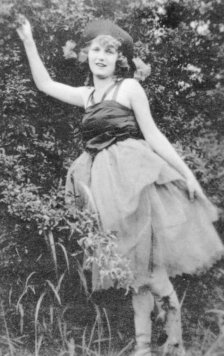
Fitzgerald in a 1918 photo from her yearbook at Sidney Lanier High School (left) and at 19 years old in a dance costume (right)

Zelda Sayre was born in Montgomery, Alabama, on July 24, 1900, the youngest of six children. Her parents were Episcopalians. Her mother, Minerva Buckner "Minnie" Machen, named her daughter after the Roma heroine in a novel, presumably Jane Howard's "Zelda: A Tale of the Massachusetts Colony" (1866) or Robert Edward Francillon's "Zelda's Fortune" (1874). Zelda was a spoiled child; her mother doted upon her daughter's every whim, but her father, Alabama politician Anthony Dickinson Sayre, was a strict and remote man whom Zelda described as a "living fortress." Sayre was a state legislator in the post-Reconstruction era who authored the landmark 1893 Sayre Act, which disenfranchised black Alabamians for seventy years and ushered in the racially segregated Jim Crow period in the state. Based on later writings, there is scholarly speculation regarding whether Anthony Sayre sexually abused Zelda as a child, but there is no evidence confirming that Zelda was a victim of incest.

At the time of Zelda's birth, her family was a prominent and influential Southern clan who had been slave-holders before the Civil War. According to biographers, "if there was a Confederate establishment in the Deep South, Zelda Sayre came from the heart of it". Zelda's maternal grandfather was Willis Benson Machen, a Confederate Senator and later a U.S. Senator from Kentucky. Her father's uncle was John Tyler Morgan, a Confederate general and the second Grand Dragon of the Ku Klux Klan in Alabama. An outspoken advocate of lynching who served six terms in the United States Senate, Morgan played a key role in laying the foundation for the Jim Crow era in the American South. In addition to wielding considerable influence in national politics, Zelda's family built the home later used by Jefferson Davis for the First White House of the Confederacy. According to biographer Sally Cline, "in Zelda's girlhood, ghosts of the late Confederacy drifted through the sleepy oak-lined streets," and Zelda claimed that she drew her strength from Montgomery's Confederate past.

During her idle youth in Montgomery, Zelda's affluent Southern family employed half a dozen domestic servants, many of whom were African-American. Consequently, Zelda was unaccustomed to domestic labor or responsibilities of any kind. As the privileged child of wealthy parents, she danced, took ballet lessons, and enjoyed the outdoors. In her youth, the family spent summers in Saluda, North Carolina, a village that would appear in her artwork decades later. In 1914, Zelda began attending Sidney Lanier High School. She was bright, but uninterested in her lessons. During high school, she continued her interest in ballet. She also drank gin, smoked cigarettes, and spent much of her time flirting with boys. A newspaper article about one of her dance performances quoted her as saying that she cared only about "boys and swimming".

She developed an appetite for attention, actively seeking to flout convention, whether by dancing or by wearing a tight, flesh-colored bathing suit to fuel rumors that she swam nude. Her father's reputation was something of a safety net, preventing her social ruin. Southern women of the time were expected to be delicate and docile, and Zelda's antics shocked the local community. Along with her childhood friend and future Hollywood star Tallulah Bankhead, she became a mainstay of Montgomery gossip. Her ethos was encapsulated beneath her graduation photo at Sidney Lanier High School in Montgomery: "Why should all life be work, when we all can borrow? Let's think only of today, and not worry about tomorrow." In her final year of high school, she was voted "prettiest" and "most attractive" in her graduating class.

== Courtship by F. Scott Fitzgerald ==
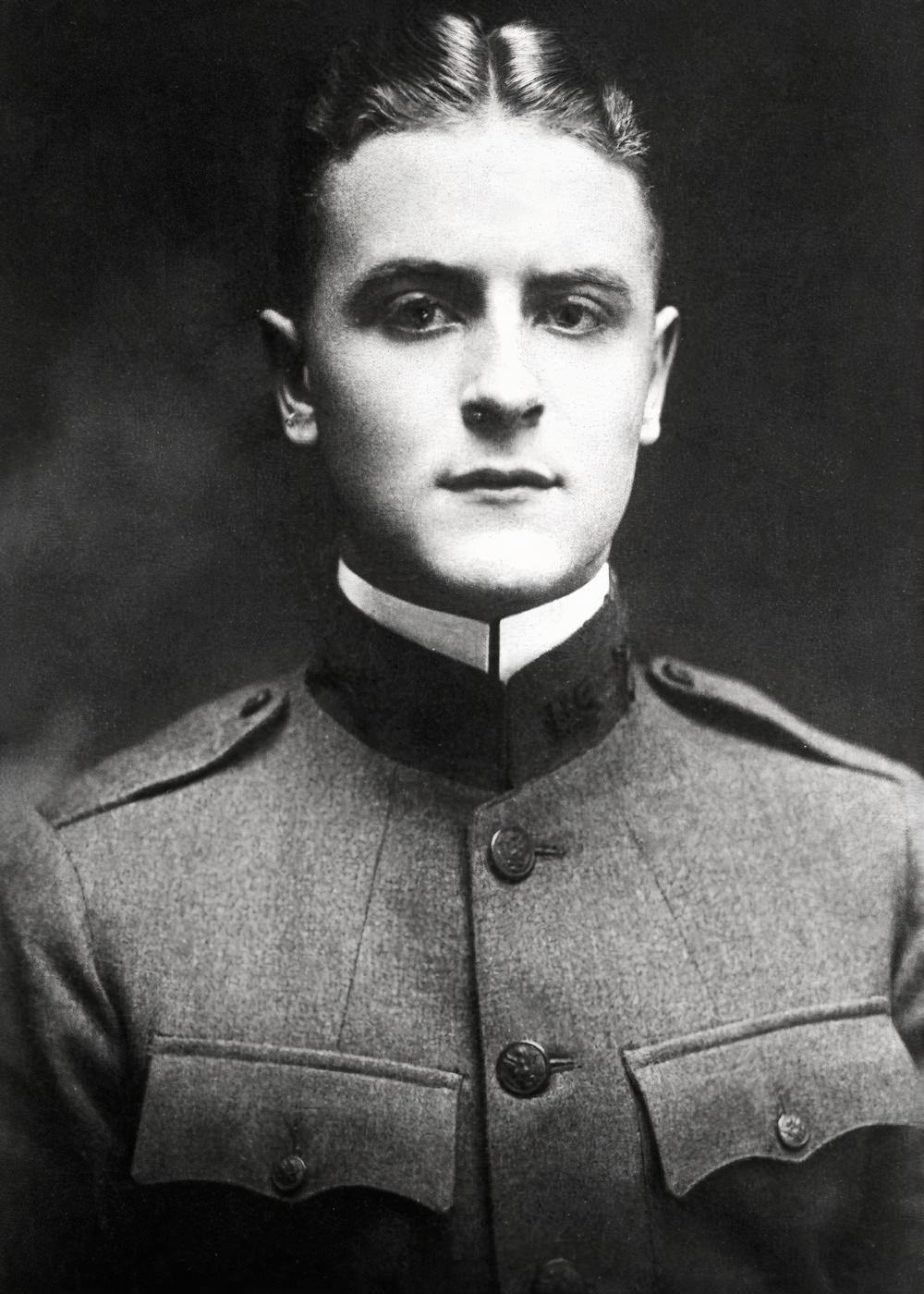
F. Scott Fitzgerald photographed in 1917, a few months before meeting Zelda in Montgomery, Alabama

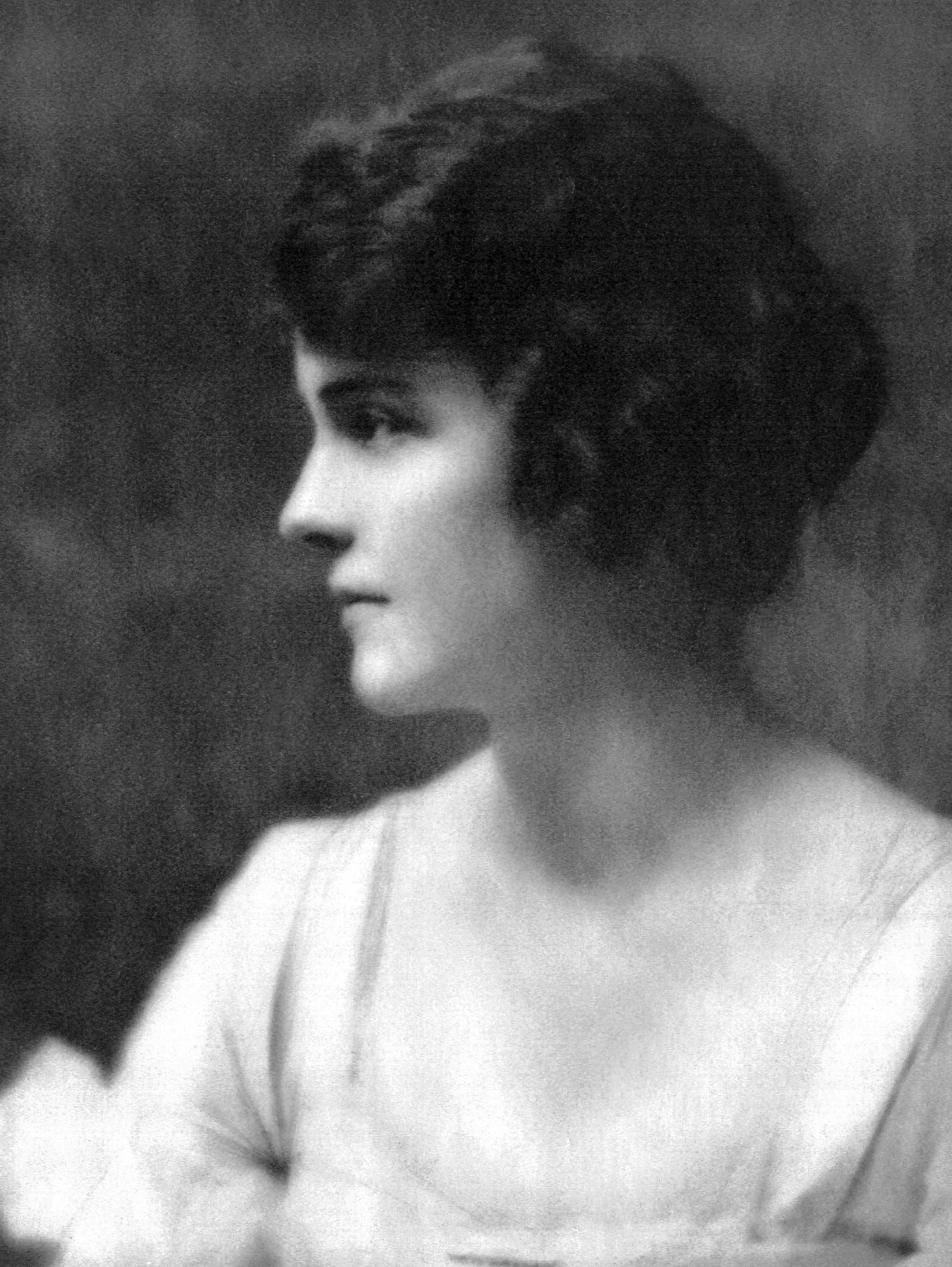
While courting Zelda Sayre, F. Scott Fitzgerald continued to write to Ginevra King, a socialite and heiress, begging her to resume their former relationship.

In July 1918, Zelda Sayre first met aspiring novelist F. Scott Fitzgerald at the Montgomery Country Club. At the time, Fitzgerald had been freshly rejected by his first love, Chicago socialite and heiress Ginevra King, due to his lack of financial prospects. Heartbroken by this rejection, Scott had dropped out of Princeton University and volunteered for the United States Army amid World War I. While awaiting deployment to the Western front, he was stationed at Camp Sheridan, outside Montgomery.

While writing to Ginevra King and begging her to resume their relationship, a lonely Fitzgerald began courting Montgomery women, including Zelda, who reminded him of Ginevra. Scott called Zelda daily, and he visited Montgomery on his free days. He often spoke of his ambition to become a famous novelist, and he sent her a chapter of a book he was writing. At the time, Zelda dismissed Fitzgerald's remarks as mere boastfulness, and she concluded that he would never become a famous writer. Infatuated with Zelda, Scott redrafted the character of Rosalind Connage in his unpublished manuscript The Romantic Egotist to resemble her, and he told Zelda that "the heroine does resemble you in more ways than four."

In addition to inspiring the character of Rosalind Connage, Scott used a quote from Zelda's letters for a soliloquy by the narrator at the conclusion of The Romantic Egotist, later retitled and published as This Side of Paradise. Zelda wrote Scott a letter eulogizing the Confederate dead who perished during the American Civil War. "I've spent today in the graveyard... Isn't it funny how, out of a row of Confederate soldiers, two or three will make you think of dead lovers and dead loves—when they're exactly like the others, even to the yellowish moss," she wrote to Scott. In the final pages of his novel, Fitzgerald altered Zelda's sentiments to refer to Union soldiers instead of Confederates.

During the early months of their courtship, Zelda and Scott strolled through the Confederate Cemetery at Oakwood Cemetery. While walking past the headstones, Scott ostensibly failed to show sufficient reverence, and Zelda informed Scott that he would never understand how she felt about the Confederate dead. Scott drew upon Zelda's intense feelings about the Confederacy and the Old South in his 1920 short story The Ice Palace about a Southern girl who becomes lost in an ice maze while visiting a northern town.

While dating Zelda and other women in Montgomery, Scott received a letter from Ginevra King informing him of her impending arranged marriage to polo player William "Bill" Mitchell. Three days after Ginevra King married Bill Mitchell on September 4, 1918, Scott professed his affections for Zelda. In his ledger, Scott wrote that he had fallen in love on September 7, 1918. His love for Zelda increased as time passed, and he wrote to his friend Isabelle Amorous: "I love her and that's the beginning and end of everything. You're still a Catholic, but Zelda's the only God I have left now." Ultimately, Zelda fell in love as well. Her biographer Nancy Milford wrote, "Scott had appealed to something in Zelda which no one before him had perceived: a romantic sense of self-importance which was kindred to his own."

Their courtship was interrupted in October when he was summoned north. He expected to be sent to France, but he was instead assigned to Camp Mills, Long Island. While he was there, the Allied Powers signed an armistice with Imperial Germany. He then returned to the base near Montgomery. Together again, Zelda and Scott now engaged in what he later described as sexual recklessness, and by December 1918, they had consummated their relationship. Although this was the first time they were sexually intimate, both Zelda and Scott had other sexual partners prior to their first meeting and courtship. Initially, Fitzgerald did not intend to marry Zelda, but the couple gradually viewed themselves as informally engaged, although Zelda declined to marry him until he proved financially successful.

On February 14, 1919, he was discharged from the military and went north to establish himself in New York City. During this time, Zelda mistakenly feared she was pregnant. Scott mailed her pills to induce an abortion, but Zelda refused to take them and replied in a letter: "I simply can't and won't take those awful pills... I'd rather have a whole family than sacrifice my self-respect... I'd feel like a damn whore if I took even one." They wrote frequently, and by March 1920, Scott had sent Zelda his mother's ring, and the two had become engaged. However, when Scott's attempts to become a published author faltered during the next four months, Zelda became convinced that he could not support her accustomed lifestyle, and she broke off the engagement during the Red Summer of 1919. Having been rejected by both Zelda and Ginevra during the past year due to his lack of financial prospects, Scott suffered from intense despair, and he carried a revolver daily while contemplating suicide.

Soon after, in July 1919, Scott returned to St. Paul. Having returned to his hometown as a failure, Scott became a social recluse and lived on the top floor of his parents' home at 599 Summit Avenue, on Cathedral Hill. He decided to make one last attempt to become a novelist and to stake everything on the success of a book. Abstaining from alcohol and parties, he worked day and night to revise The Romantic Egotist as This Side of Paradise—an autobiographical account of his Princeton years and his romances with Ginevra, Zelda, and others. At the time, Scott's feelings for Zelda were at an all-time low, and he remarked to a friend, "I wouldn't care if she died, but I couldn't stand to have anybody else marry her."

== Marriage and celebrity ==
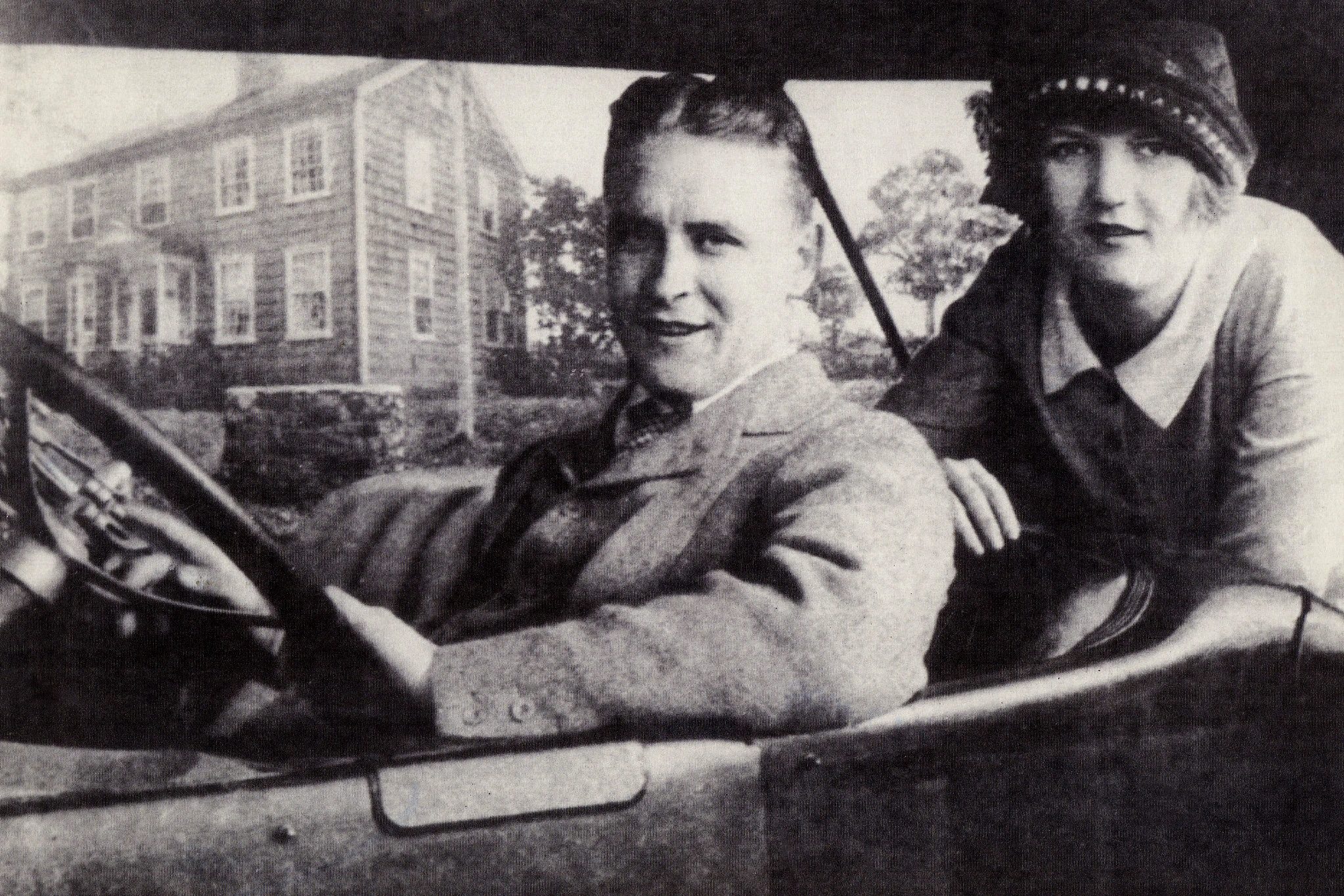
After marrying in April 1920, Zelda became homesick for the Deep South, prompting her and Scott to embark on a road trip that summer to visit her family in Montgomery, Alabama

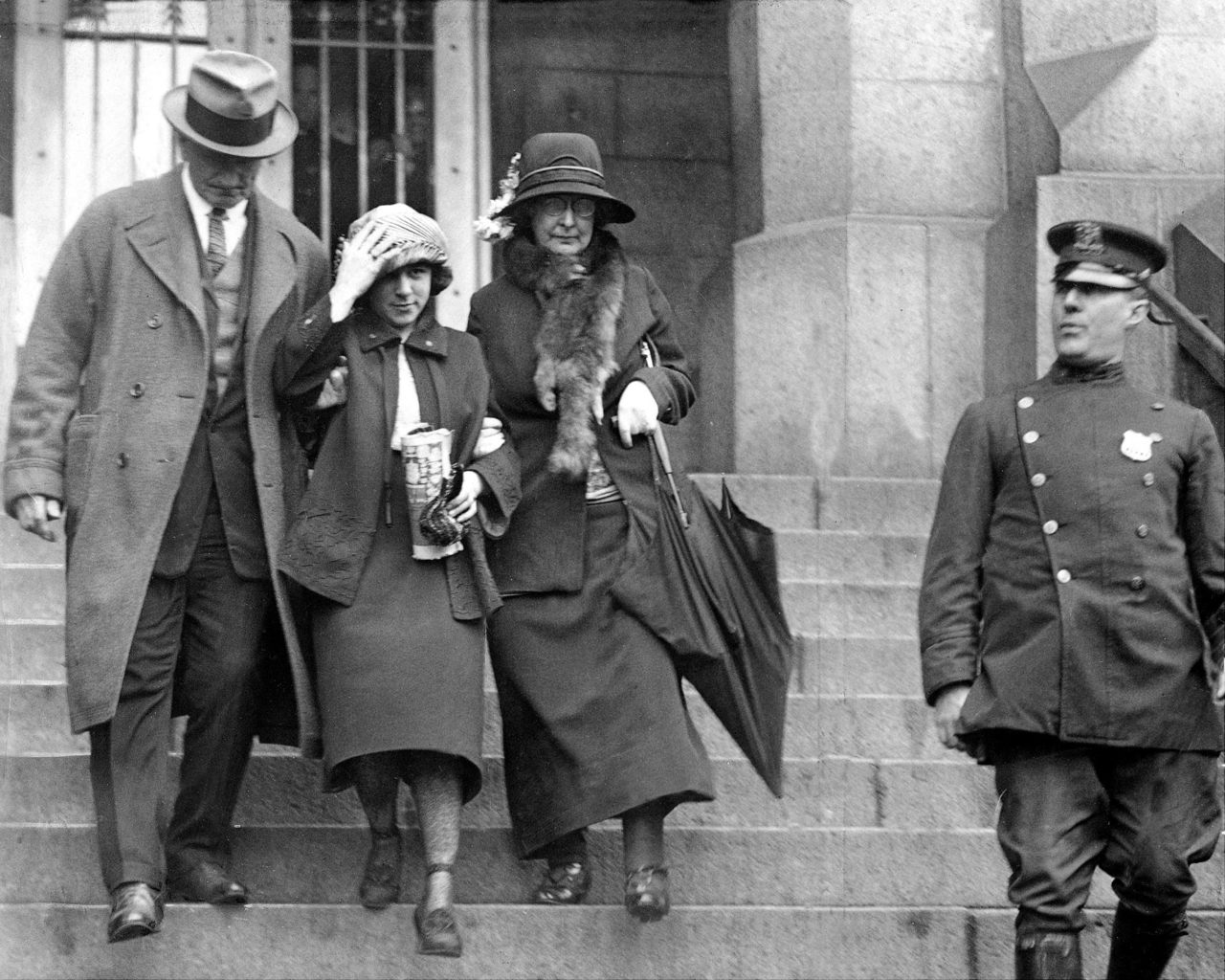
In Spring 1924, Zelda was detained by the New York Police Department on suspicion of being the infamous "Bobbed Haired Bandit," later identified as Celia Cooney (pictured). Soon after, Zelda and her husband departed New York City for Europe.

By September 1919, Scott completed his first novel, This Side of Paradise, and editor Maxwell Perkins of Charles Scribner's Sons accepted the manuscript for publication. Scott requested an accelerated release to renew Zelda's faith in him: "I have so many things dependent on its success—including of course a girl." After Scott informed Zelda of his novel's upcoming publication, a shocked Zelda replied apologetically: "I hate to say this, but I don't think I had much confidence in you at first.... It's so nice to know you really can do things—anything—and I love to feel that maybe I can help just a little." Zelda agreed to marry Scott once Scribner's published the novel. Scribner's published This Side of Paradise on March 26, 1920, and Zelda traveled by train to New York wearing a Confederate gray suit.

A few days later, on April 3, 1920, they married in a small ceremony at St. Patrick's Cathedral. At the time of their wedding, Fitzgerald later claimed neither he nor Zelda still loved each other, and the early years of their marriage in New York City proved to be a disappointment. According to biographer Andrew Turnbull, "victory was sweet, though not as sweet as it would have been six months earlier before Zelda had rejected him. Fitzgerald couldn't recapture the thrill of their first love". As the affections between Zelda and Scott cooled, Scott continued to obsess over the loss of his first love, Ginevra King, and, for the remainder of their marriage, he could not think of Ginevra "without tears coming to his eyes."

Despite the cooling of their affections, Scott and Zelda quickly became celebrities of New York, as much for their wild behavior as for the success of This Side of Paradise. They were ordered to leave both the Biltmore Hotel and the Commodore Hotel for disturbing other guests. Their daily lives consisted of outrageous pranks and drunken escapades. While fully dressed, they jumped into the water fountain in front of the Plaza Hotel in New York. They frequently hired taxicabs and rode on the hood. One evening, while inebriated, they decided to visit the county morgue, where they inspected unidentified corpses; and, on another evening, Zelda insisted on sleeping in a dog kennel. Alcohol increasingly fueled their nightly escapades. Publicly, this meant little more than napping when they arrived at parties; but privately, it increasingly led to bitter arguments. To their mutual delight, New York newspapers depicted Zelda and Scott as cautionary examples of youth and excess—the enfants terribles of the hedonistic Jazz Age.

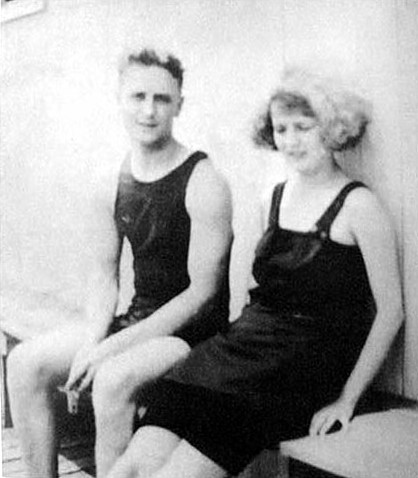
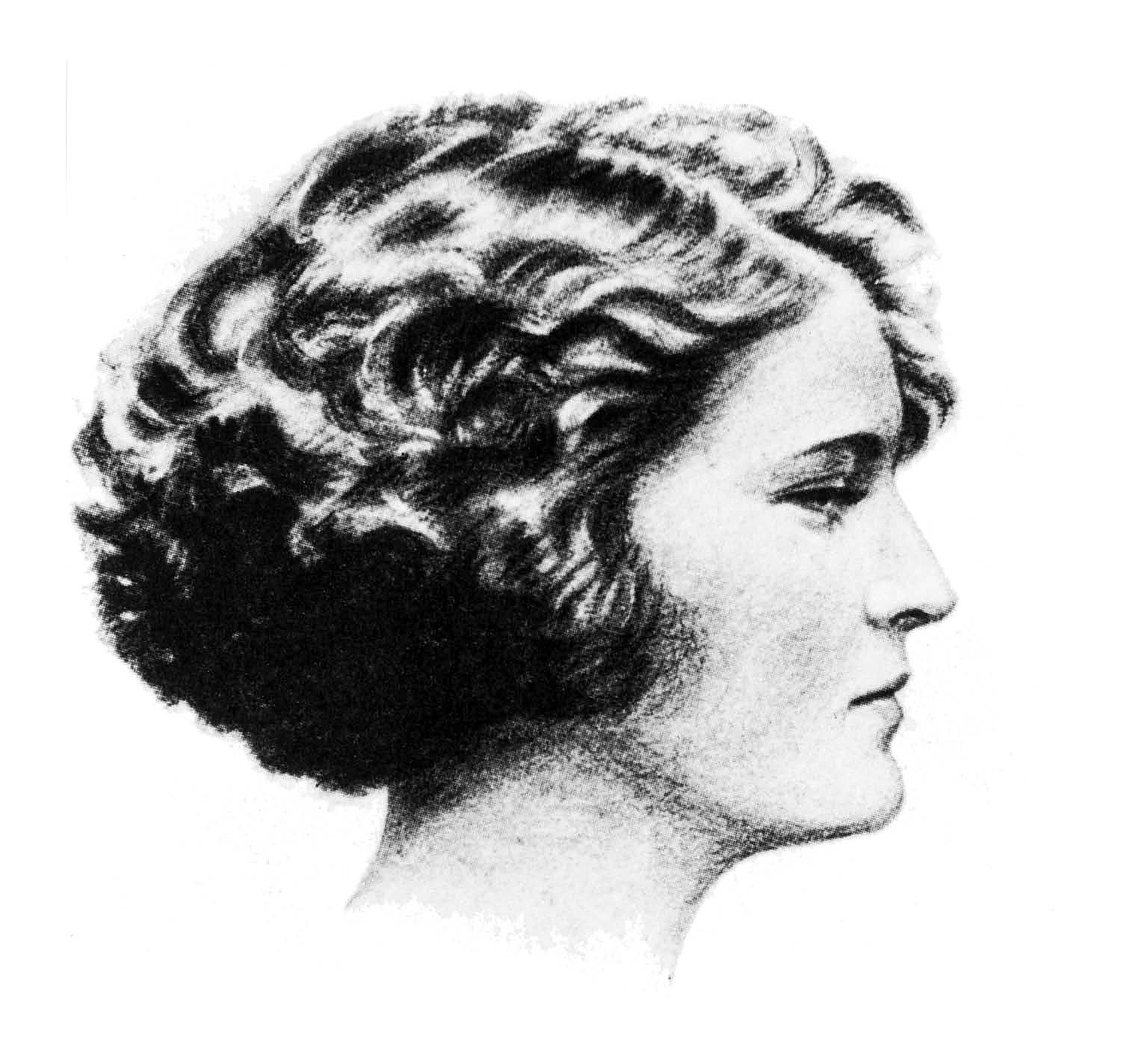
Zelda and Scott at the beach in Westport, Connecticut, c. March 1922 (left), and a profile sketch of Zelda by artist Gordan Bryant published in Metropolitan Magazine in June 1922 (right)

After a month of hotel evictions, the Fitzgeralds moved to a cottage in Westport, Connecticut, where Scott worked on drafts of his second novel. Because of her privileged upbringing with many African-American servants, Zelda could not perform household responsibilities at Westport. During the early months of their marriage, Scott's unwashed clothes began disappearing. One day, he opened a closet and discovered his dirty clothes piled to the ceiling. Uncertain of what to do with unwashed clothes, Zelda had never sent them out for cleaning: she had simply tossed everything into the closet.

Soon after, Scott employed two maids and a laundress. Zelda's complete dependence upon servants became the comedic focus of magazine articles. When Harper & Brothers asked Zelda to contribute her favorite recipes in an article, she wrote: "See if there is any bacon, and if there is, ask the cook which pan to fry it in. Then ask if there are any eggs, and if so try and persuade the cook to poach two of them. It is better not to attempt toast, as it burns very easily. Also, in the case of bacon, do not turn the fire too high, or you will have to get out of the house for a week. Serve preferably on china plates, though gold or wood will do if handy."

While Scott attempted to write his next novel at their home in Westport, Zelda announced that she was homesick for the Deep South. In particular, she missed eating Southern cuisine such as peaches and biscuits for breakfast. She suggested that they travel to Montgomery, Alabama. On July 15, 1920, the couple traveled in a touring car—which Scott derogatorily nicknamed "the rolling junk"—to her parents' home in Montgomery. After visiting Zelda's family for several weeks, they abandoned the unreliable vehicle and returned via train to Westport, Connecticut. Zelda's parents visited their Westport cottage soon after, but her father Judge Anthony Sayre took a dim view of the couples' constant partying and scandalous lifestyle. Following this visit, the Fitzgeralds relocated to an apartment at 38 West 59th Street in New York City.

== Pregnancy and Scottie ==
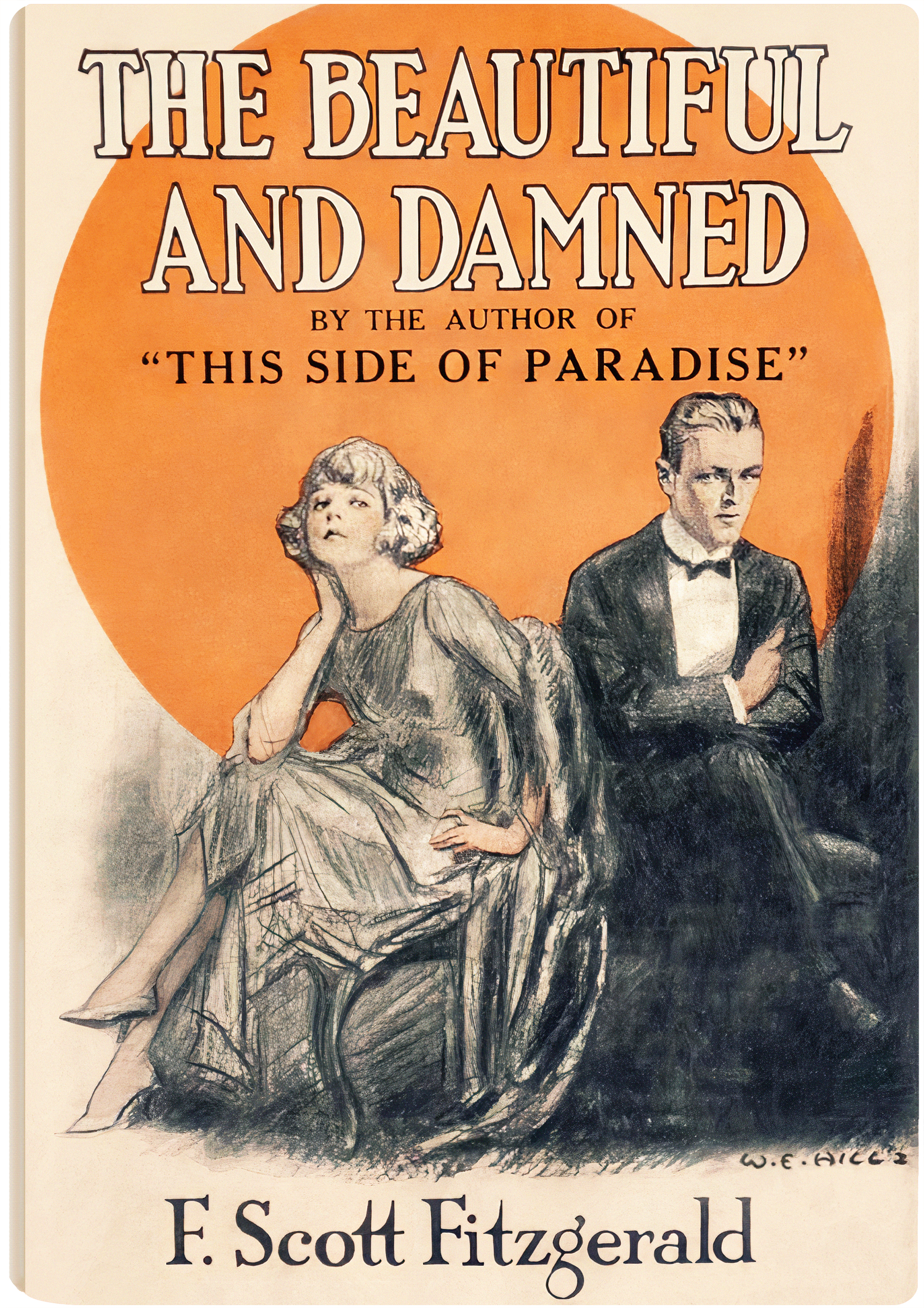
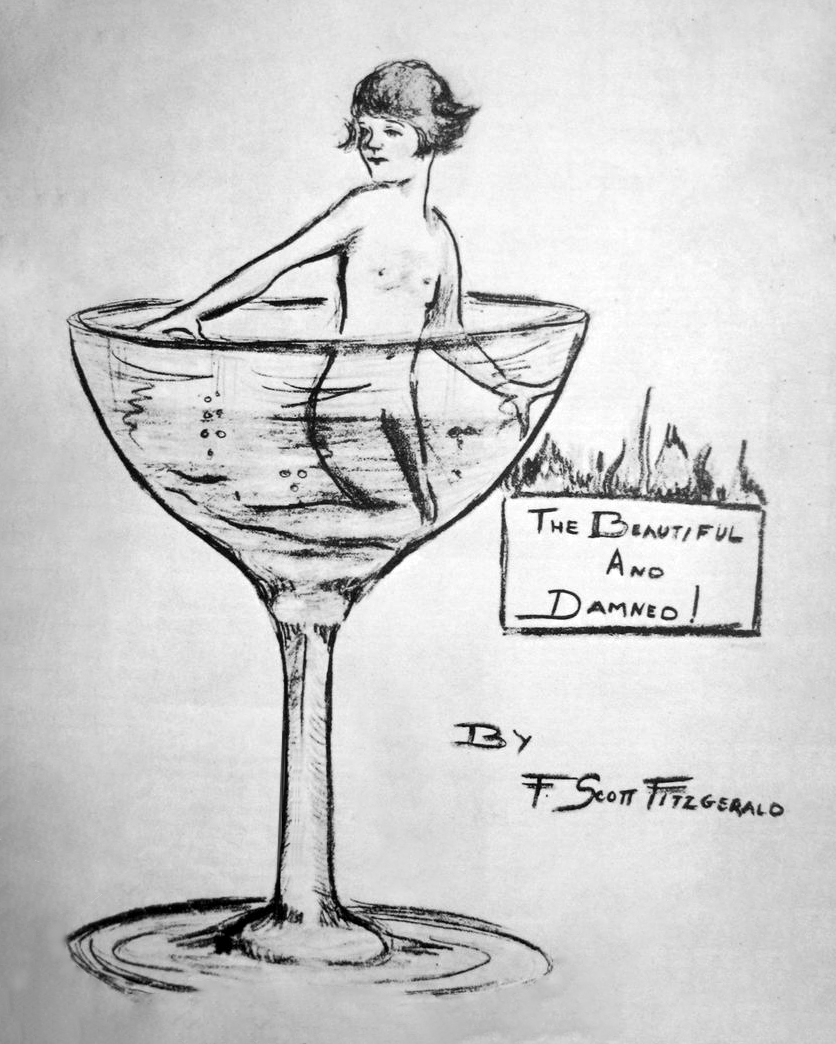
The cover (left) of The Beautiful and Damned with the characters of Anthony and Gloria drawn by W. E. Hill to resemble Scott and Zelda juxtaposed with a sketch (right) by Zelda in which she envisioned the dust-jacket for the novel. Ultimately, the publisher used W.E. Hill's work for the dust-jacket.

In February 1921, while Scott labored on drafts of his inchoate second novel, The Beautiful and Damned, Zelda discovered she was pregnant. She requested that the child be born on Southern soil in Alabama, but Fitzgerald adamantly refused. Zelda wrote despondently to a friend: "Scott's changed... He used... to say he loved the South, but now he wants to get as far away from it as he can." To Zelda's chagrin, her husband insisted upon having the baby at his northern home in Saint Paul, Minnesota. On October 26, 1921, she gave birth to Frances "Scottie" Fitzgerald. As she emerged from anesthesia, Scott recorded Zelda saying, "Oh, God, goofo I'm drunk. Mark Twain. Isn't she smart—she has the hiccups. I hope it's beautiful and a fool—a beautiful little fool." Many of her words found their way into Scott's novels: in The Great Gatsby, the character Daisy Buchanan expresses a similar hope for her daughter.

While writing The Beautiful and Damned, Scott drew upon "bits and pieces" of Zelda's diary and letters. (Note: According to Fitzgerald scholar Matthew J. Bruccoli, "Zelda does not say she collaborated on The Beautiful and Damned: only that Fitzgerald incorporated a portion of her diary 'on one page' and that he revised 'scraps' of her letters. None of Fitzgerald's surviving manuscripts shows her hand".) He modeled the character Anthony Patch on himself and the character Gloria Patch on—in his words—the chill-mindedness and selfishness of Zelda. Prior to publication, Zelda proofread the drafts, and she urged her husband to cut the cerebral ending, which focused on the main characters' lost idealism. Upon its publication, Burton Rascoe, the newly appointed literary editor of the New York Tribune, approached Zelda for an opportunity to entice readers with a satirical review of Scott's latest work as a publicity stunt.

Although Zelda had carefully proofread drafts of the novel, she pretended in her review to read the novel for the very first time, and she wrote partly in jest that "on one page I recognized a portion of an old diary of mine... and, also, scraps of letters which, though considerably edited, sound to me vaguely familiar. In fact, Mr. Fitzgerald—I believe that is how he spells his name—seems to believe that plagiarism begins at home." In the same review, Zelda joked that she hoped her husband's novel would become a commercial success as "there is the cutest cloth of gold dress for only $300 in a store on Forty-second Street".

The satirical review led to Zelda receiving offers from other magazines to write stories and articles. According to their daughter, Scott "spent many hours editing the short stories she sold to College Humor and to Scribner's Magazine". In June 1922, Metropolitan Magazine published an essay by Zelda Fitzgerald titled "Eulogy on the Flapper". At the time flappers were typically young, modern women who bobbed their hair and wore short skirts. They also drank alcohol and had premarital sex. Though ostensibly a piece about the decline of the flapper lifestyle after its heyday in the early 1920s, Zelda's biographer Nancy Milford wrote that Zelda's essay served as "a defense of her own code of existence." In the article, Zelda described the ephemeral phenomenon of the flapper:

The Flapper awoke from her lethargy of sub-deb-ism, bobbed her hair, put on her choicest pair of earrings and a great deal of audacity and rouge and went into the battle. She flirted because it was fun to flirt and wore a one-piece bathing suit because she had a good figure ... she was conscious that the things she did were the things she had always wanted to do. Mothers disapproved of their sons taking the Flapper to dances, to teas, to swim and most of all to heart.

After the publication of The Beautiful and Damned in March 1922, the Fitzgeralds traveled to either New York or St. Paul in order for Zelda to procure an abortion. Ultimately, Zelda would have three abortions during their marriage, and her sister Rosalind later questioned whether Zelda's later mental deterioration was due to health side-effects of these unsafe procedures. Zelda's thoughts on terminating her second pregnancy are unknown, but in the first draft of The Beautiful and Damned, Scott wrote a scene in which Gloria Gilbert believes she is pregnant and Anthony Patch suggests she "talk to some woman and find out what's best to be done. Most of them fix it some way." Anthony's suggestion was removed from the final version, and this significant alteration shifted the focus from a moral dilemma about the act of abortion to Gloria's superficial concern that a baby would ruin her figure.

Following the financial failure of Scott's play The Vegetable, the Fitzgeralds found themselves mired in debt. Although Scott wrote short stories furiously to pay the bills, he became burned out and depressed. During this period, while Scott wrote short stories at home, the New York Police Department detained Zelda near the Queensboro Bridge on the suspicion of her being the "Bobbed Haired Bandit," an infamous spree-robber later identified as Celia Cooney. Following this incident, the couple departed in April 1924 for Paris, France, in the hope of living a more frugal existence abroad in Europe.

== Expatriation to Europe ==
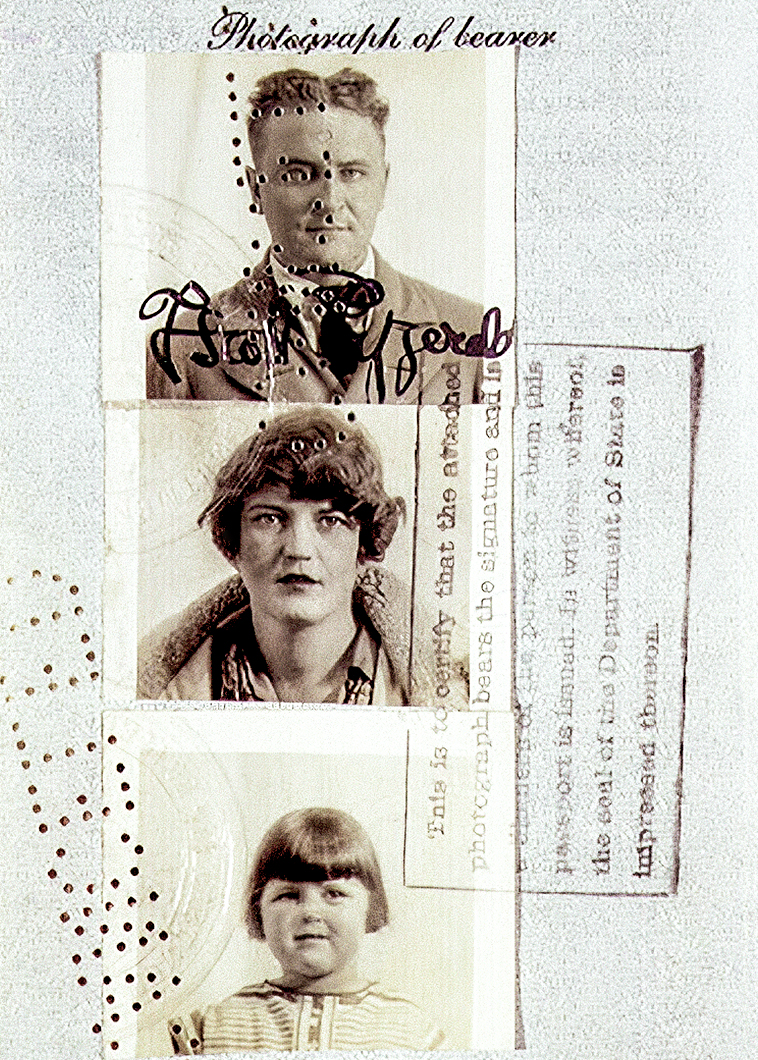
Zelda, Scott, and their daughter Scottie pictured in their passport book for their trip to Europe in 1924

After arriving in Paris, the couple soon relocated to Antibes on the French Riviera. While Scott labored on drafts of The Great Gatsby, Zelda became infatuated with a French naval aviator, Edouard Jozan. The exact details of the supposed romance are unverifiable and contradictory, and Jozan himself claimed that the Fitzgeralds invented the entire incident. According to conflicting accounts, Zelda spent afternoons swimming at the beach and evenings dancing at the casinos with Jozan. After several weeks, she asked Scott for a divorce. Scott purportedly challenged Jozan to duel and locked Zelda in their villa until he could kill him. Before any fatal confrontation could occur, Jozan—who had no intention of marrying Zelda—fled the Riviera, and the Fitzgeralds never saw him again. Soon after, Zelda possibly overdosed on sleeping pills.

On his part, Jozan dismissed the entire story as pure fabrication and claimed that no romance with Zelda had ever occurred: "They both had a need of drama, they made it up and perhaps they were the victims of their own unsettled and a little unhealthy imagination." In later retellings, both Zelda and Scott embellished the story, and Zelda later falsely told Ernest Hemingway and his wife Hadley Richardson that the affair ended when Jozan committed suicide. In fact, Jozan had been transferred by the French military to Indochina.

Regardless of whether any extramarital affair with Jozan occurred, the episode led to a breach of trust in their marriage, and Fitzgerald wrote in his notebook, "I knew something had happened that could never be repaired." The incident likely influenced Fitzgerald's writing of The Great Gatsby, and he drew upon many elements of his tempestuous relationship with Zelda, including the loss of certainty in her love. In August, he wrote to his friend Ludlow Fowler: "I feel old too, this summer ... the whole burden of this novel—the loss of those illusions that give such color to the world that you don't care whether things are true or false as long as they partake of the magical glory."

Scott finalized The Great Gatsby in October 1924. The couple attempted to celebrate with travel to Rome and Capri, but both were unhappy and unhealthy. When he received the galleys for his novel, Scott fretted over the best title: Trimalchio in West Egg, just Trimalchio or Gatsby, Gold-hatted Gatsby, or The High-bouncing Lover. Disliking Fitzgerald's chosen title of Trimalchio in West Egg, editor Max Perkins persuaded him that the reference was too obscure and that people would be unable to pronounce it. After both Zelda and Perkins expressed their preference for The Great Gatsby, Fitzgerald agreed. It was also on this trip, while ill with colitis, that Zelda began painting artworks.

== Meeting Ernest Hemingway ==
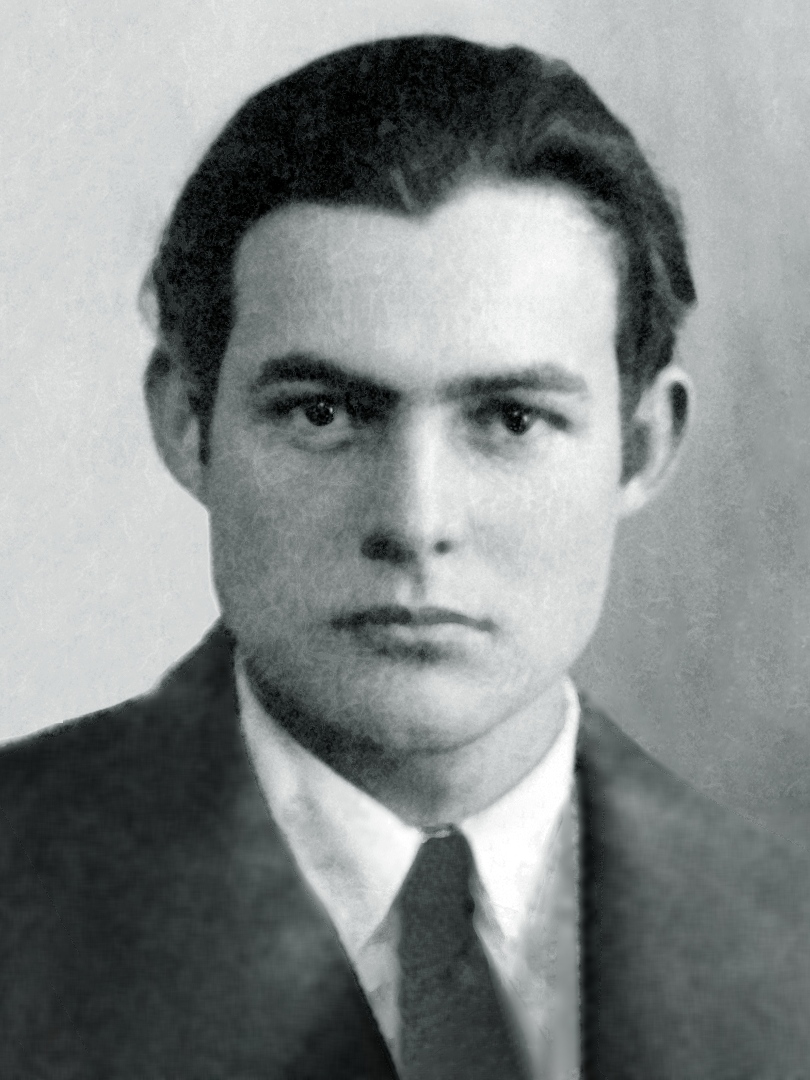
Writer Ernest Hemingway in 1923, two years before he met Zelda and Scott Fitzgerald in Paris

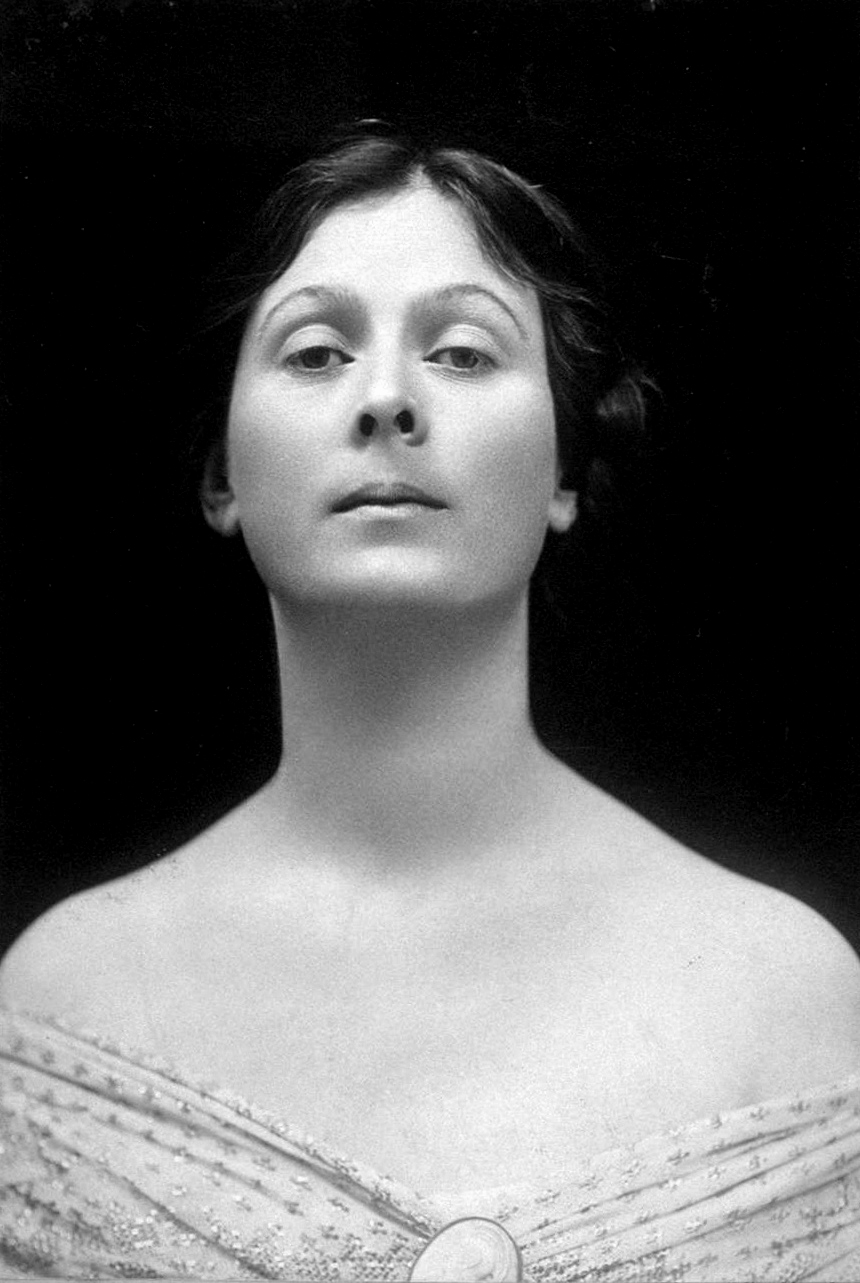
F. Scott Fitzgerald's attention to dancer Isadora Duncan at a party led Zelda to throw herself down a flight of marble stairs.

Returning to Paris in April 1925, Zelda met Ernest Hemingway, whose career her husband did much to promote. Through Hemingway, the Fitzgeralds were introduced to Gertrude Stein, Alice B. Toklas, Robert McAlmon, and others. Scott and Hemingway became close friends, but Zelda and Hemingway instantly disliked each other from their first meeting, although Hemingway admitted to having an "erotic dream" about Zelda the night they met. She openly referred to him with homophobic slurs and denounced him as a "fairy with hair on his chest". She considered Hemingway's domineering macho persona to be merely a posture to conceal his homosexuality; in turn, Hemingway told Scott that Zelda was "insane". In his memoir A Moveable Feast, Hemingway claims he realized that Zelda had a mental illness when she insisted that jazz singer Al Jolson was greater than Jesus Christ. Hemingway alleged that Zelda sought to destroy her husband, and she purportedly taunted Fitzgerald over his penis size. After examining it in a public restroom, Hemingway confirmed Fitzgerald's penis to be of average size.

Hemingway claimed that Zelda urged her husband to write lucrative short stories as opposed to novels in order to support her accustomed lifestyle. To supplement their income, Fitzgerald often wrote stories for magazines such as The Saturday Evening Post, Collier's Weekly, and Esquire. "I always felt a story in The Post was tops," Zelda later recalled, "but Scott couldn't stand to write them. He was completely cerebral, you know. All mind." Scott would write his stories in an "authentic" manner and then rewrite them to add plot twists, which increased their salability as magazine stories. This "whoring" for Zelda—as Hemingway dubbed these sales—emerged as a sore point in their friendship. After reading The Great Gatsby, Hemingway vowed to put any differences with Fitzgerald aside and to aid him in any way he could, although he feared Zelda would derail Fitzgerald's career. In a letter to Fitzgerald, Hemingway warned him that Zelda would derail his career:

Of all people on earth you needed discipline in your work and instead you marry someone who is jealous of your work, wants to compete with you and ruins you. It's not as simple as that and I thought Zelda was crazy the first time I met her and you complicated it even more by being in love with her and, of course, you're a rummy.

A more serious rift in the Fitzgerald's marriage occurred when Zelda suspected that Scott was closeted homosexual, and she alleged that Fitzgerald and Hemingway engaged in homosexual relations. In the ensuing months, she frequently belittled Scott with homophobic slurs during their public excursions. Biographer Matthew J. Bruccoli posits that Zelda's inordinate preoccupation with other persons' sexual behavior likely indicated the onset of her paranoid schizophrenia. However, Fitzgerald's sexuality was a popular subject of debate among his friends and acquaintances. As a youth, Fitzgerald had a close relationship with Father Sigourney Fay, a possibly gay Catholic priest, and Fitzgerald later used his last name for the idealized romantic character of Daisy Fay Buchanan. After college, Fitzgerald cross-dressed during outings in Minnesota and flirted with men at social events. While staying in Paris, rumors dogged Fitzgerald among the American expat community that he was gay.

Irritated by Zelda's recurrent homophobic attacks on his sexual identity, (Note: Fessenden (2005) argues that Fitzgerald struggled with his sexual orientation. In contrast, Bruccoli (2002) insists that "anyone can be called a latent homosexual, but there is no evidence that Fitzgerald was ever involved in a homosexual attachment".) Scott decided to have sex with a Parisian prostitute. Zelda found condoms that he had purchased before any sexual encounter occurred, and a bitter quarrel ensued, resulting in ingravescent jealousy. Soon after, a jealous Zelda threw herself down a flight of marble stairs at a party because Fitzgerald, engrossed in talking to American dancer Isadora Duncan, ignored her. In December 1926, after two unpleasant years in Europe that considerably strained their marriage, the Fitzgeralds returned to America, but their marital difficulties continued to fester.

In January 1927, the Fitzgeralds relocated to Los Angeles, where Scott wrote Lipstick for United Artists and met Hollywood starlet Lois Moran. Jealous of Moran, Zelda set fire to her clothing in a bathtub as a self-destructive act. She disparaged Moran as "a breakfast food that many men identified with whatever they missed from life." Fitzgerald's relations with Moran exacerbated the Fitzgeralds' marital difficulties and, after merely two months in Hollywood, the unhappy couple relocated to Ellerslie in Wilmington, Delaware, in March 1927. Literary critic Edmund Wilson, recalling a party at the Fitzgerald home in Edgemoor, Delaware, in February 1928, described Zelda as follows:

I sat next to Zelda, who was at her iridescent best. Some of Scott's friends were irritated; others were enchanted, by her. I was one of the ones who were charmed. She had the waywardness of a Southern belle and the lack of inhibitions of a child. She talked with so spontaneous a color and wit—almost exactly in the way she wrote—that I very soon ceased to be troubled by the fact that the conversation was in the nature of a 'free association' of ideas and one could never follow up anything. I have rarely known a woman who expressed herself so delightfully and so freshly: she had no ready-made phrases on the one hand and made no straining for effect on the other. It evaporated easily, however, and I remember only one thing she said that night: that the writing of Galsworthy was a shade of blue for which she did not care.

== Obsession and illness ==
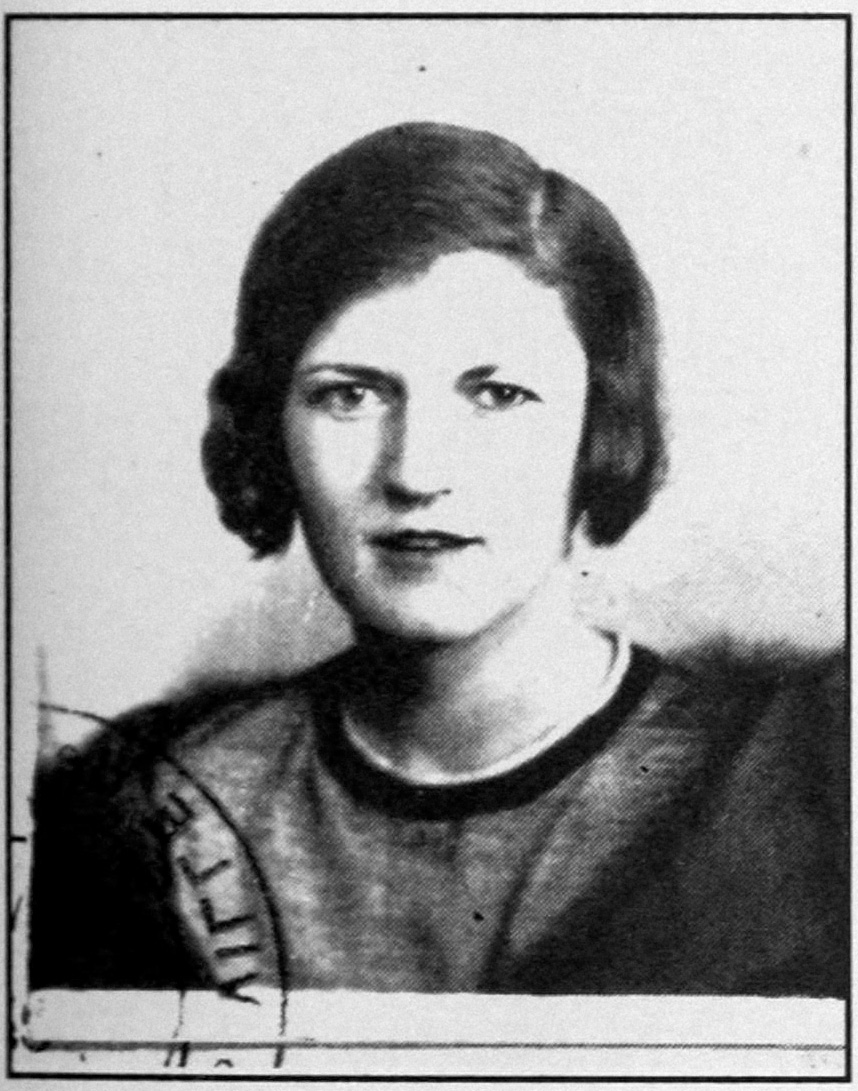
Zelda's portrait for her French identity card, c. 1929

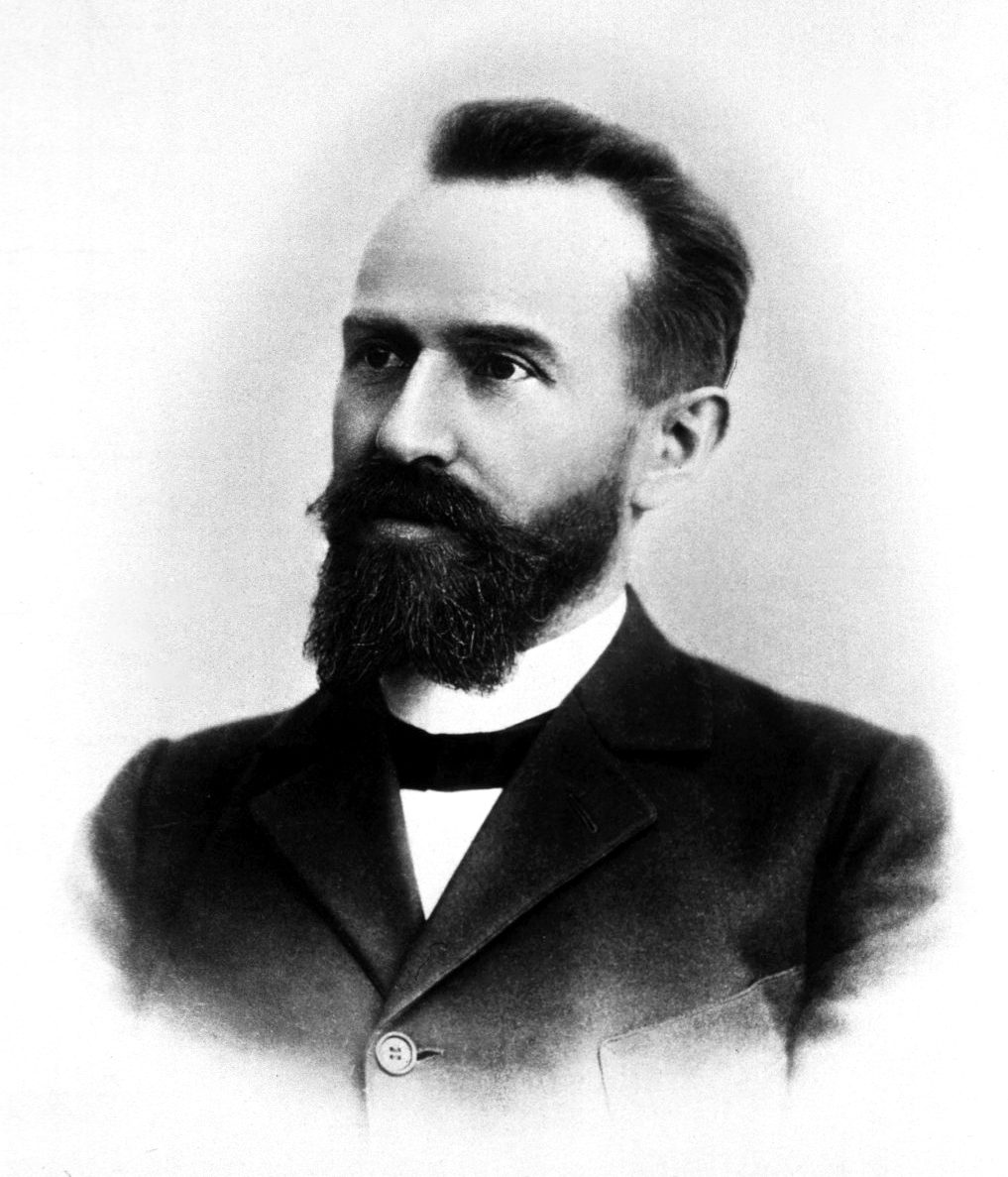
In November 1930, Eugen Bleuler, one of Europe's leading psychiatrists, diagnosed Zelda as schizophrenic.

By 1927, at the Ellersie estate in Wilmington, Delaware, Scott had become severely alcoholic, and Zelda's behavior became increasingly erratic. Much of the conflict between them stemmed from the boredom and isolation Zelda experienced when Scott was writing. She would often interrupt him when he was working, and the two grew increasingly miserable. Stung by Fitzgerald's criticism that all great women use their talents constructively, Zelda had a deep desire to develop a talent that was entirely her own.

At the age of 28, she became obsessed with Russian ballet, and she decided to embark upon a career as a prima ballerina. Her friend Gerald Murphy counseled against her ambition and remarked that "there are limits to what a woman of Zelda's age can do and it was obvious that she had taken up the dance too late." Despite her being far too old to achieve such an ambition, Scott Fitzgerald paid for Zelda to begin practicing under the tutelage of Catherine Littlefield, director of the Philadelphia Opera Ballet. After the Fitzgeralds returned to Europe in summer 1928, Scott paid for Zelda to study under Russian ballerina Lubov Egorova in Paris.

In September 1929, the San Carlo Opera Ballet Company in Naples invited her to join their ballet school. In preparation, Zelda undertook a grueling daily practice of up to eight hours a day, and she "punished her body in strenuous efforts to improve." According to Zelda's daughter, although Scott "greatly appreciated and encouraged his wife's unusual talents and ebullient imagination," he became alarmed when her "dancing became a twenty-four-hour preoccupation which was destroying her physical and mental health." Soon after, Zelda collapsed from physical and mental exhaustion. One evening, Scott returned home to find an exhausted Zelda seated on the floor and entranced with a pile of sand. When he asked her what she was doing, she could not speak. He summoned a French physician, who examined Zelda and informed him that "your wife is mad."

Soon after her physical and mental collapse, Zelda's mental health further deteriorated. In October 1929, during an automobile trip to Paris along the mountainous roads of the Grande Corniche, Zelda seized the car's steering wheel and tried to kill herself, her husband, and her nine-year-old daughter, Scottie, by driving over a cliff. After this homicidal incident, Zelda sought psychiatric treatment. On April 23, 1930, the Malmaison Clinic near Paris admitted her for observation. On May 22, 1930, she moved to Valmont sanatorium in Montreux, Switzerland. The clinic primarily treated gastrointestinal ailments, and, due to her profound psychological problems, she was moved again to a psychiatric facility in Prangins on the shores of Lake Geneva on June 5, 1930. At Prangins in June, Dr. Oscar Forel issued a tentative diagnosis of schizophrenia, but he feared her psychological condition might be far worse. Zelda's biographer, Nancy Milford, quotes Dr. Forel's full diagnosis:

The more I saw Zelda, the more I thought at the time [that] she is neither [suffering from] a pure neurosis nor a real psychosis—I considered her a constitutional, emotionally unbalanced psychopath—she may improve, [but] never completely recover.

After five months of observation, Doctor Eugen Bleuler—one of Europe's leading psychiatrists—confirmed Dr. Forel's diagnosis of Zelda as a schizophrenic on November 22, 1930. (Following Zelda's death, later psychiatrists speculated that Zelda instead had bipolar disorder.) She was released from Prangins in September 1931. In an attempt to keep his wife out of an asylum, Scott hired nurses and attendants to care for Zelda at all times. Although there were periods where her behavior was merely eccentric, she could frequently become a danger to herself and others. In one instance, she attempted to throw herself in front of a moving train and, in another instance, she attacked a visiting guest at their home without provocation. Despite her precarious mental health, the couple traveled to Montgomery, Alabama, where her father, Judge Anthony Sayre, lay dying. After her father's death, her mental health again deteriorated and she had another breakdown.

== Save Me the Waltz ==
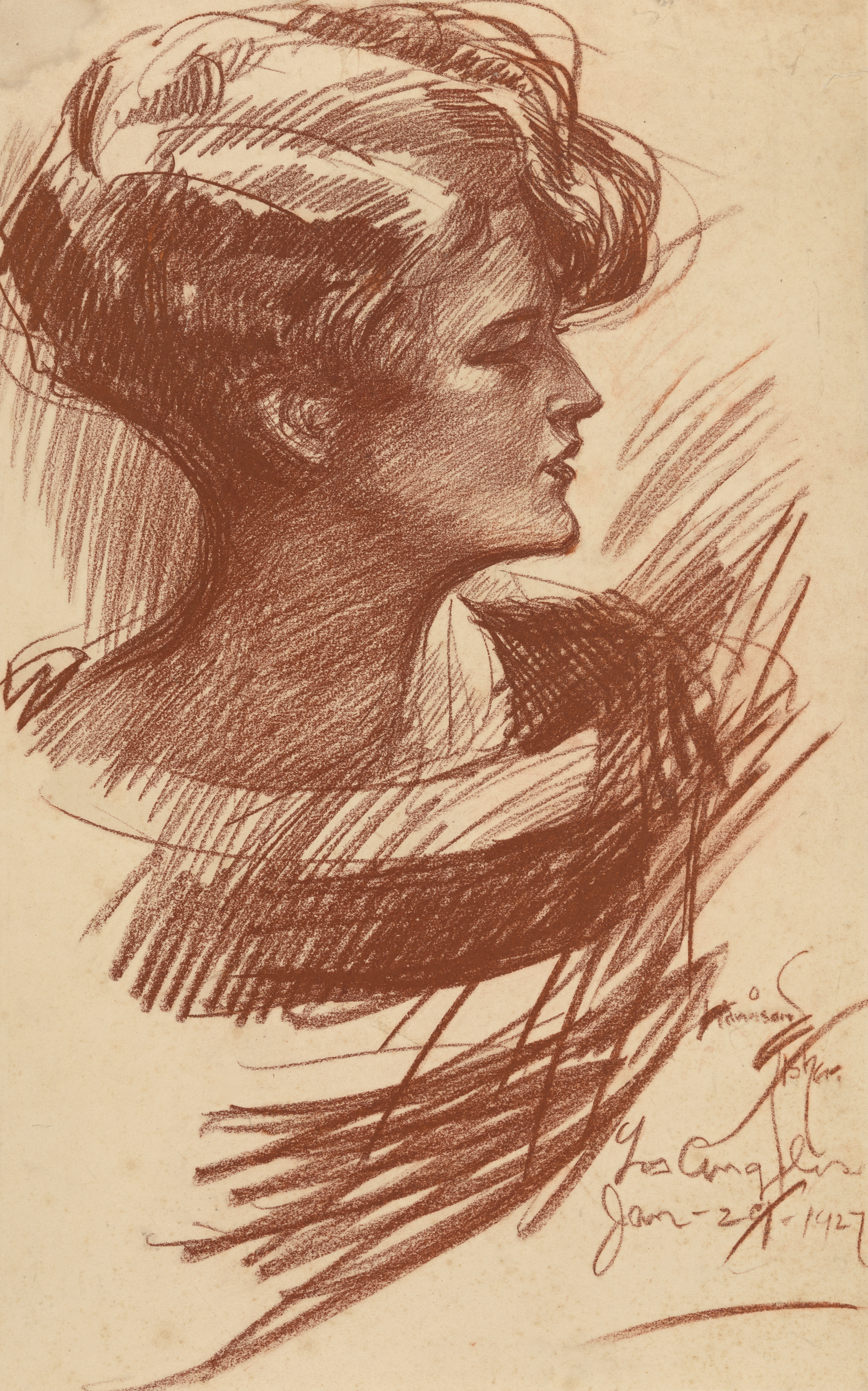
A 1927 portrait of Fitzgerald by Harrison Fisher

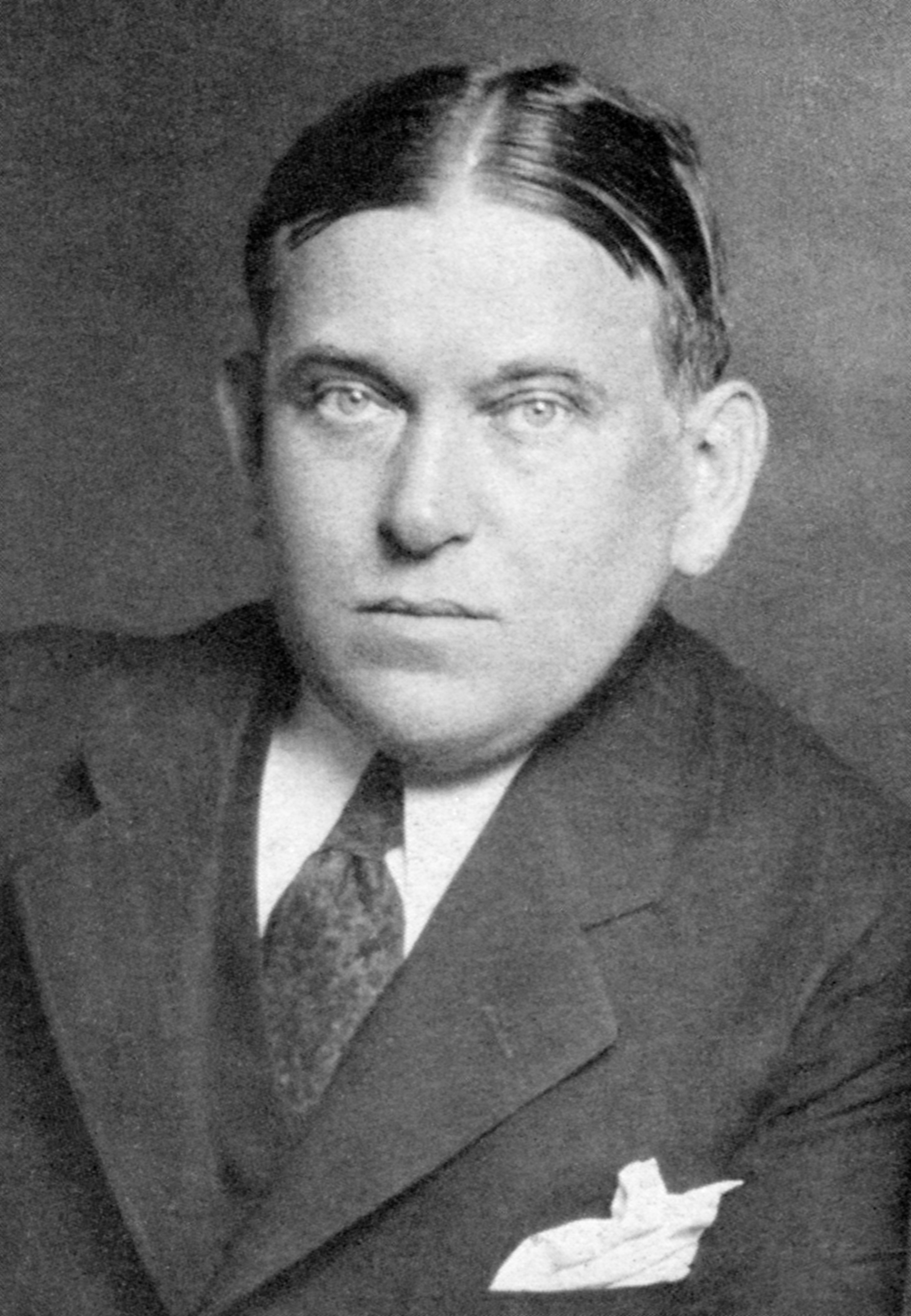
After meeting Zelda for lunch in April 1932, writer H. L. Mencken described her as exhibiting constant signs of mental distress and anguish.

In February 1932, after an episode of hysteria, Zelda insisted that she be readmitted to a mental hospital. On February 12, 1932, over her husband's objections, Fitzgerald was admitted by The Henry Phipps Psychiatric Clinic at Johns Hopkins Hospital in Baltimore, where her treatment was overseen by Dr. Adolf Meyer, an expert on schizophrenia. As part of her recovery routine, she spent at least two hours a day writing a manuscript. At the Phipps Clinic, Zelda developed a bond with Dr. Mildred Squires, a female resident. When Dr. Squires asked Scott to speculate why Zelda's mental health had deteriorated, Fitzgerald replied:

Perhaps fifty percent of our friends and relatives would tell you in all honest conviction that my drinking drove Zelda insane—the other half would assure you that her insanity drove me to drink. Neither judgement would mean anything.

Toward the end of February 1932, Zelda shared fragments of her manuscript with Dr. Squires, who wrote to Scott that the unfinished novel was vivid and had charm. Zelda wrote to Scott from the hospital, "I am proud of my novel, but I can hardly restrain myself enough to get it written. You will like it—It is distinctly École Fitzgerald, though more ecstatic than yours—perhaps too much so." Zelda finished the novel on March 9. She sent the unaltered manuscript to Scott's editor, Maxwell Perkins, at Scribner's.

Surprised to receive an unannounced novel in the mail from Zelda, Perkins carefully perused the manuscript. He concluded the work had "a slightly deranged quality which gave him the impression that the author had difficulty in separating fiction from reality." He felt the manuscript contained several good sections, but its overall tone seemed hopelessly "dated" and tonally resembled Fitzgerald's 1922 work The Beautiful and Damned. Perkins hoped that her husband might be able to improve its overall quality with his criticism.

Upon learning that Zelda had submitted her manuscript to Perkins, Scott became angry that she had not shown her manuscript to him beforehand. After reading the manuscript, he objected to her novel's plagiarism of his protagonist in This Side of Paradise. He was further upset to learn that Zelda's novel used the very same plot elements as his upcoming novel, Tender Is the Night. After receiving letters from Scott delineating these objections, Zelda wrote to Scott apologetically that she was "afraid we might have touched the same material."

Despite Scott's initial annoyance, a debt-ridden Fitzgerald realized that Zelda's book might earn a tidy profit. Consequently, his requested revisions were "relatively few", and "the disagreement was quickly resolved, with Scott recommending the novel to Perkins." Several weeks later, Scott wrote to Perkins: "Here is Zelda's novel. It is a good novel now, perhaps a very good novel—I am too close to tell. It has the faults and virtues of a first novel.... It should interest the many thousands in dancing. It is about something and absolutely new, and should sell." Although unimpressed, Perkins agreed to publish the work as a way for Fitzgerald to repay his financial debt to Scribner's. Perkins arranged for half of Zelda's royalties to be applied against Scott's debt to Scribner's until at least $5,000 had been repaid.

In March 1932, the Phipps Clinic discharged Zelda, and she joined her husband Scott and her daughter at the La Paix estate in Baltimore, Maryland. Although discharged, she remained mentally unwell. A month later, Fitzgerald took her to lunch with critic H. L. Mencken, the literary editor of The American Mercury. In his diary, Mencken noted Zelda "went insane in Paris a year or so ago, and is still plainly more or less off her base." Throughout the luncheon, she manifested signs of mental distress. A year later, when Mencken met Zelda for the last time, he described her mental illness as immediately evident to any onlooker and her mind as "only half sane." He regretted that F. Scott Fitzgerald could not write novels, as he had to write magazine stories to pay for Zelda's psychiatric treatment.

A shooting star, an ectoplasmic arrow, sped through the nebulous hypothesis like a wanton hummingbird. From Venus to Mars to Neptune it trailed the ghost of comprehension, illuminating far horizons over the pale battlefields of reality.

— Zelda Fitzgerald, Save Me the Waltz (1932)

On October 7, 1932, Scribner's published Save Me the Waltz with a printing of 3,010 copies—not unusually low for a first novel in the middle of the Great Depression—on cheap paper, with a cover of green linen. According to Zelda, the book derived its title from a Victor record catalog, and the title evoked the romantic glitter of the lifestyle which F. Scott Fitzgerald and herself experienced during the riotous Jazz Age. The parallels to the Fitzgeralds were obvious: The protagonist of the novel is Alabama Beggs—like Zelda, the daughter of a Southern judge—who marries David Knight, an aspiring painter who abruptly becomes famous for his work. They live the fast life in Connecticut before departing to live in France. Dissatisfied with her marriage, Alabama throws herself into ballet. Though told she has no chance, she perseveres and after three years becomes the lead dancer in an opera company. Alabama becomes ill from exhaustion, however, and the novel ends when they return to her family in the South, as her father is dying.

Echoing Zelda's frustrations, the novel portrays Alabama's struggle to establish herself independently of her husband and to earn respect for her own accomplishments. In contrast to Scott's unadorned prose, Zelda's writing style in Save Me the Waltz is replete with verbal flourishes and complex metaphors. The novel is also deeply sensual; as literary scholar Jacqueline Tavernier-Courbin observed in 1979, "the sensuality arises from Alabama's awareness of the life surge within her, the consciousness of the body, the natural imagery through which not only emotions but simple facts are expressed, the overwhelming presence of the senses, in particular touch and smell, in every description."

Save Me the Waltz received overwhelmingly negative reviews from literary critics. The critics savaged Zelda's prose as overwritten, attacked her characterization as weak, and declared her tragic scenes to be unintentionally comedic. Although some praised her writing as "always vibrant and always sensitive", other critics faulted the "exaggerated" and "atrocious" prose as "words gone wild" to the point of unintelligibility. Geoffrey T. Hellman wrote in The Saturday Review of Literature that "her book rivals the cross-word puzzle page in point of obscurity" and lamented "the author's general inability to create full-bodied figures." Similarly, a Forum and Century reviewer wrote that, although "gifted with a talent for crisp dialogue and with a pleasant sense of the humorous, Mrs. Fitzgerald has some reason seen fit to subordinate this element in her first novel to an extremely involved prose style which fails to do anything but clog both the action of the plot and the reader's understanding of the characters."

== Painting and later years ==
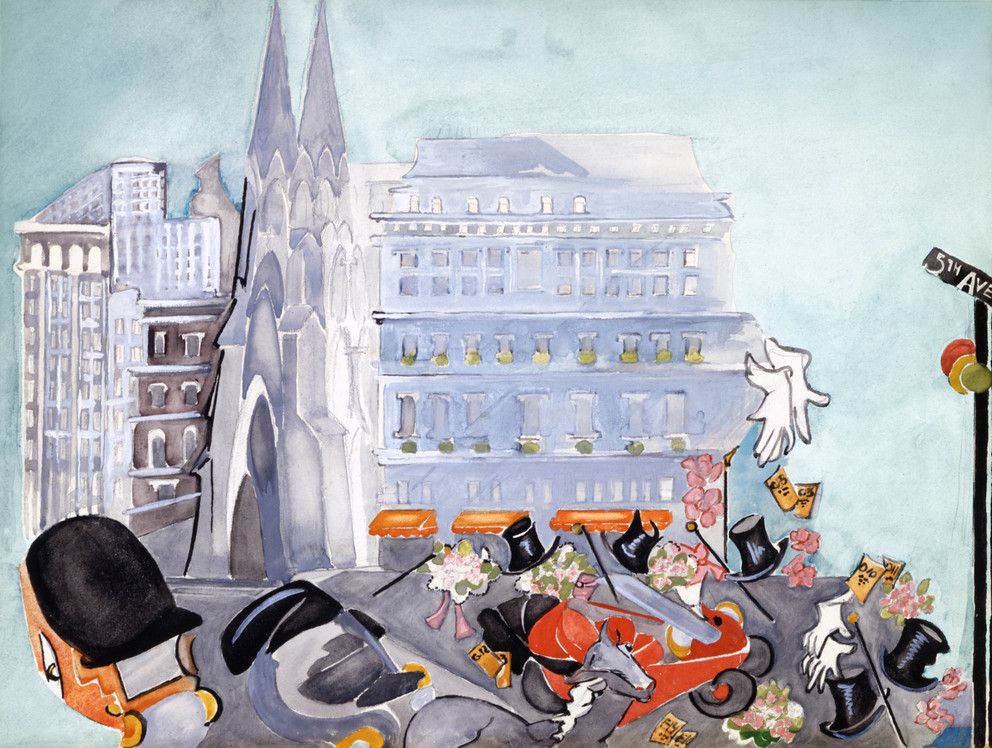
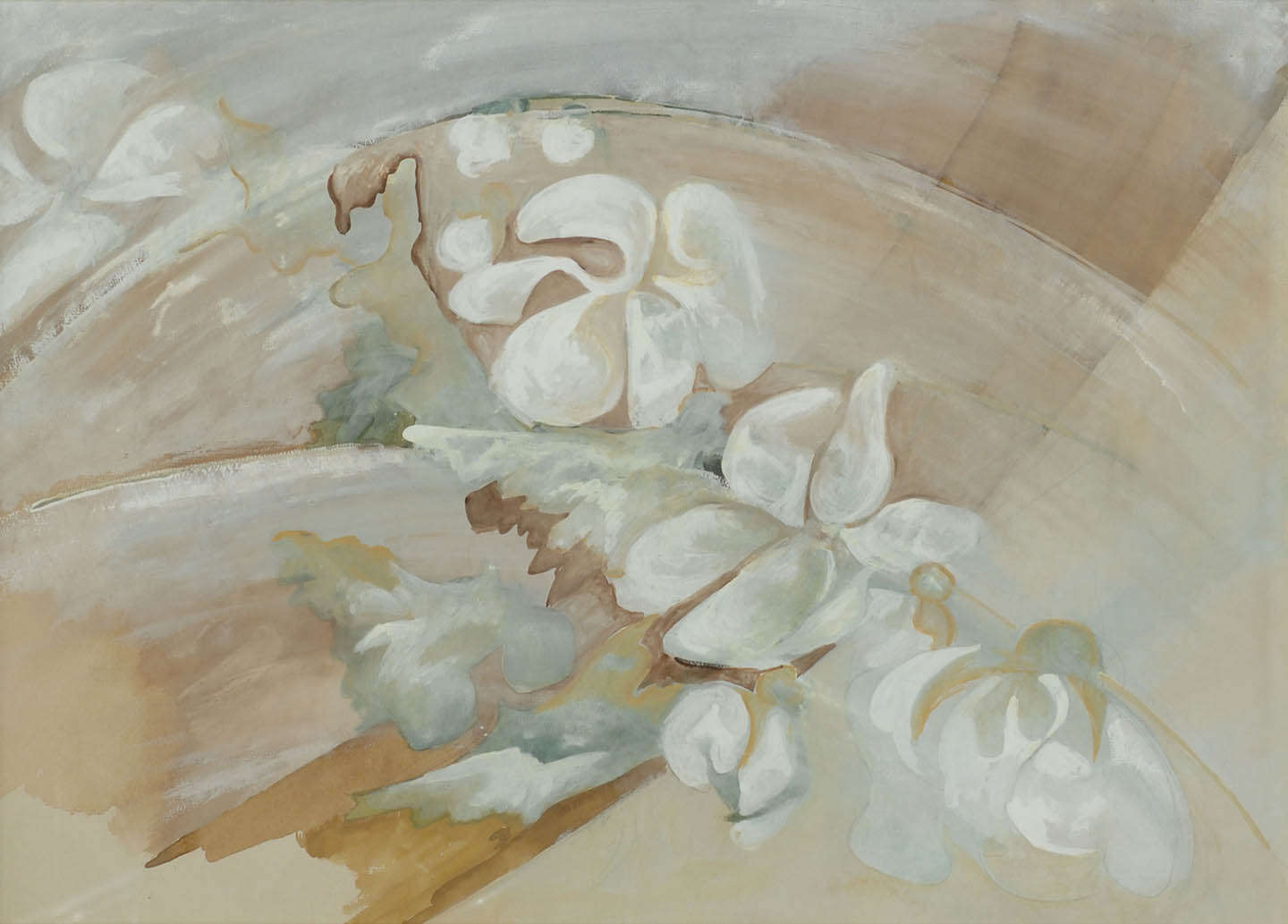
Two examples of Zelda's paintings. Her works such as Fifth Avenue (top), gouache on paper, and Still Life with Cyclamen (bottom), watercolor on paper, were exhibited in 1934.

From the mid-1930s onward, Zelda would be hospitalized sporadically for the rest of her life at sanatoriums in Baltimore, New York, and in Asheville, North Carolina. When Scott visited Zelda in the sanatoriums, she increasingly exhibited signs of mental instability. During one visit, Scott and friends took Zelda on an outing to a nearby home in Tryon, North Carolina. During the lunch, she became withdrawn and ceased communication. On the return drive to the sanatorium, she wrenched open the car door and threw herself out of the moving vehicle in an attempt to kill herself. In another incident, Zelda's unexpected loss of a tennis match at the Asheville sanatorium resulted in her physically attacking her tennis partner and beating them over the head with her tennis racket.

Despite the deterioration of her mental health, she continued pursuing her artistic ambitions. After the critical and commercial failure of Save Me the Waltz, she attempted to write a farcical stage play titled Scandalabra in Fall 1932. However, after submitting the manuscript to agent Harold Ober, Broadway producers rejected her play. Following this rejection, Scott arranged for her play Scandalabra to be staged by a Little Theater group in Baltimore, Maryland, and he sat through long hours of rehearsals of the play. A year later, during a group therapy session with her husband and a psychiatrist, Fitzgerald remarked that she was "a third-rate writer and a third-rate ballet dancer." Following this remark, Zelda attempted to paint watercolors while in and out of sanatoriums.

In March 1934, Scott Fitzgerald arranged the first exhibition of Zelda's artwork—13 paintings and 15 drawings—in New York City. As with the tepid reception of her book, New York critics were ill-disposed towards her paintings. The New Yorker described them merely as "paintings by the almost mythical Zelda Fitzgerald; with whatever emotional overtones or associations may remain from the so-called Jazz Age." No actual description of the paintings was provided in the review.

Following the critical failure of her artwork exhibition, Scott awoke one morning to discover Zelda had gone missing. After the arrival of a doctor and several attendants, a manhunt ensued in New York City. Ultimately, they found Zelda in Central Park digging a grave. Soon after, she became even more violent and reclusive. In 1936, Scott placed her in the Highland Hospital in Asheville, North Carolina, writing to friends:

Zelda now claims to be in direct contact with Christ, William the Conqueror, Mary Stuart, Apollo and all the stock paraphernalia of insane-asylum jokes ... For what she has really suffered, there is never a sober night that I do not pay a stark tribute of an hour to in the darkness. In an odd way, perhaps incredible to you, she was always my child (it was not reciprocal as it often is in marriages) ... I was her great reality, often the only liaison agent who could make the world tangible to her.

Zelda remained in the hospital while Scott returned to Hollywood for a $1,000-a-week job with MGM in June 1937. Estranged from Zelda, he attempted to reunite with his first love, Ginevra King, when she visited California in October 1938, but his uncontrolled alcoholism sabotaged their brief reunion. When a disappointed King returned to Chicago, Fitzgerald settled into a clandestine relationship with Hollywood gossip columnist Sheilah Graham. Throughout their relationship, Graham claimed that Fitzgerald felt constant guilt over Zelda's mental illness and confinement. He repeatedly attempted sobriety, suffered from depression, had violent outbursts, and attempted suicide.

For the next several years, a depressed Scott continued screenwriting on the West Coast and visiting a hospitalized Zelda on the East Coast. In April 1939, a coterie from Zelda's mental hospital had planned to go to Cuba, but Zelda had missed the trip. The Fitzgeralds decided to go on their own. The trip proved to be a disaster. During the trip, spectators at a cockfight beat Scott when he tried to intervene against animal cruelty. Upon his return to the United States, a binge-drinking Scott tested positive for active tuberculosis and required hospitalization, and Zelda returned alone by train to Highland Hospital. Scott wrote to Zelda in May: "You are the finest, loveliest, tenderest, most beautiful person I have ever known, but even that is an understatement". The Fitzgeralds never saw each other again.

I am sorry that there should be nothing to greet you but an empty shell . . . I love you anyway . . . even if there isn't any me or any love or even any life . . . I love you.

— Zelda Fitzgerald, Letter to F. Scott Fitzgerald, December 1940

Scott returned to Hollywood in order to pay the ever-increasing bills for Zelda's continued hospitalization. She made some progress in Asheville, and in March 1940, four years after admittance, she was discharged to her mother's care. She was nearly forty now, her friends were long gone, and the Fitzgeralds no longer had much money. They wrote to each other frequently, and they made plans to meet again in December 1940. In a letter Zelda wrote to Fitzgerald shortly before he died of a heart attack, she said: "I am sorry that there should be nothing to greet you but an empty shell . . . I love you anyway . . . even if there isn't any me or any love or even any life . . . I love you." Their planned rendezvous did not occur due to Scott's death of occlusive coronary arteriosclerosis at 44 years of age in December 1940. Due to her fragile mental health, Zelda could not attend his funeral in Rockville, Maryland.

After Scott's death, Zelda read his unfinished manuscript titled The Love of the Last Tycoon. She wrote to his friend Edmund Wilson who agreed to edit the book and to eulogize his legacy. Zelda believed Scott's work contained "an American temperament grounded in belief in oneself and 'will-to-survive' that Scott's contemporaries had relinquished. Scott, she insisted, had not. His work possessed a vitality and stamina because of his indefatigable faith in himself." After reading The Last Tycoon, Zelda began work on a new novel, Caesar's Things. As she had missed Scott's funeral because of her mental health, she likewise missed Scottie's wedding. By August 1943, she returned to the Highland Hospital. She worked on her novel while checking in and out of the hospital. She did not get better, and she did not finish the novel.

== Hospital fire and death ==
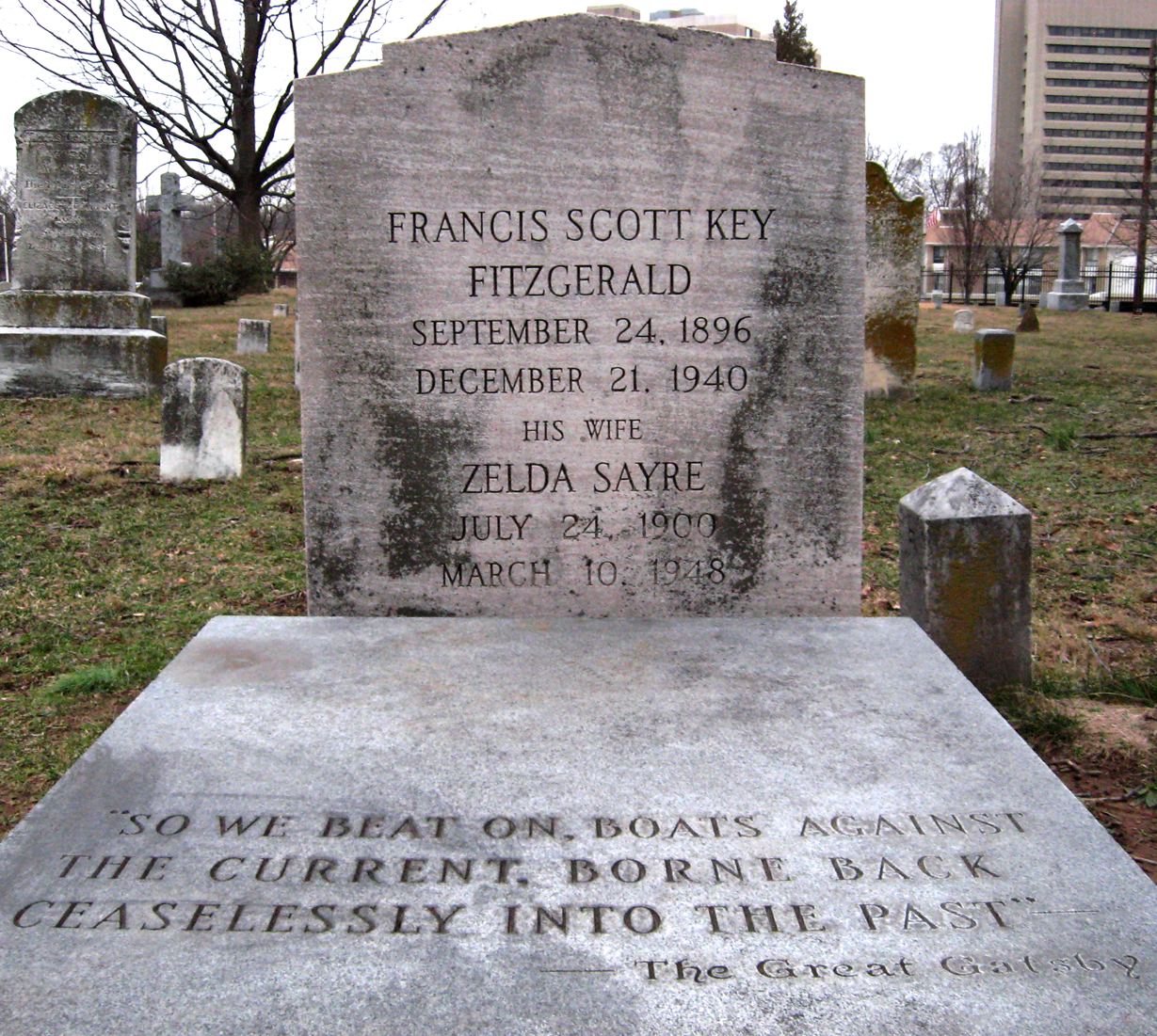
Zelda and F. Scott Fitzgerald's gravesite in Rockville, Maryland

Towards the end of her life, Zelda resided in and out of sanatoriums. Zelda checked back into the hospital in September 1946, and then she returned to live with her mother Minnie in their Alabama home. By this point in her life, she had undergone over ten years of electroshock therapy and insulin shock treatments. Consequently, she now "suffered from severe loss of memory and an apathetic personality due to constant shock therapies."

She espoused fascism as a political ideology. According to biographer Nancy Milford, Zelda became "taken with the idea of fascism as a way of holding everything together, of ordering the masses." When acquaintance Henry Dan Piper visited Zelda in March 1947, she declared that fascism served "to keep things from falling apart and to keep the finer things from being lost or extinguished."

In November 1947, Zelda returned for the last time to Highland Hospital in Asheville, North Carolina. Because of insulin treatments her weight increased to 130 lb (59 kg). Acquaintance Edna Garlington Spratt recalled Zelda's grim appearance in the final months before her death: "She was anything but pretty when I saw her. She acted normal, but she looked so dreadful. Her hair was stringy and she had lost all pride in herself." Early in March 1948, her doctors told her she was better and she could leave, but she allegedly stayed for further treatment.

On the night of March 10, 1948, a fire broke out in the hospital kitchen. Zelda had been sedated and locked in a room on the fifth floor, possibly awaiting shock therapy. The fire moved through the dumbwaiter shaft, spreading onto every floor. The fire escapes were wooden, and they caught fire as well. Nine women, including Zelda, died. She was identified by her dental records and, according to other reports, one of her slippers. A follow-up investigation raised the unconfirmed possibility that the fire had been a work of arson by Willie Mae, a disgruntled or mentally disturbed hospital employee who had initiated the fire in the kitchen.

Zelda and Scott were buried in Rockville, Maryland, originally in Rockville Cemetery, away from his family plot. Only one photograph of the original gravesite is known to exist, taken in 1970 by Fitzgerald scholar Richard Anderson and published in 2016. At her daughter Scottie's request, Zelda and Scott were interred with the other Fitzgeralds at Saint Mary's Catholic Cemetery. Inscribed on their tombstone is the final sentence of The Great Gatsby: "So we beat on, boats against the current, borne back ceaselessly into the past."

== Critical reappraisal ==
Self-portrait, a watercolor probably painted by Fitzgerald in the early 1940s

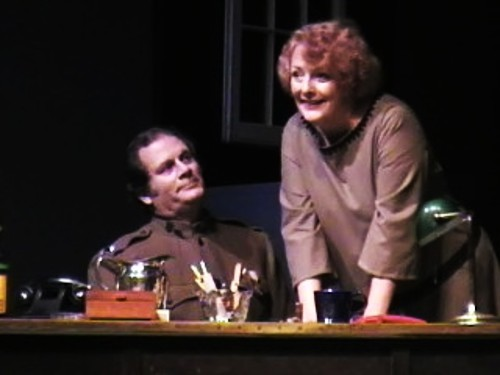
Lauren Bloom as Zelda Fitzgerald and Lance Adell as F. Scott Fitzgerald in The Last Flapper, a 2006 dramatization of her life

At the time of his third and fatal heart attack in December 1940, her husband Scott Fitzgerald died believing himself to be a failure as a writer. Two years later, after the United States' entrance into World War II, an association of publishing executives created the Council on Books in Wartime which distributed 155,000 copies of The Great Gatsby to U.S. soldiers overseas, and the book proved popular among beleaguered troops. By 1944, a full-scale Fitzgerald revival had occurred. Despite the renewed interest in Scott's oeuvre, Zelda's death in March 1948 was little noted in the press.

In 1950, acquaintance and screenwriter Budd Schulberg wrote The Disenchanted, with characters based recognizably on the Fitzgeralds who end up as forgotten former celebrities, he awash with alcohol and she befuddled by mental illness. It was followed in 1951 by Cornell University professor Arthur Mizener's The Far Side of Paradise, a biography of F. Scott Fitzgerald that rekindled interest in the couple among scholars. Mizener's biography was serialized in The Atlantic Monthly, and a story about the book appeared in Life magazine. Scott was depicted as a fascinating failure; Zelda's mental health was largely blamed for his lost potential.

In 1970, however, the history of Zelda and Scott's marriage saw its most profound revision in a book by Nancy Milford, a graduate student at Columbia University. Zelda: A Biography, the first book-length treatment of Zelda's life, became a finalist for the National Book Award and figured for weeks on The New York Times best-seller list. The book recast Zelda as an artist in her own right whose talents were belittled by a controlling husband. Zelda posthumously became an icon of the feminist movement in the 1970s—a woman whose unappreciated potential had been suppressed by patriarchal society.

After the success of Milford's 1970 biography, scholars began to view Zelda's work in a new light. Prior to Milford's biography, scholar Matthew J. Bruccoli had written in 1968 that Zelda's novel Save Me the Waltz was "worth reading partly because anything that illuminates the career of F. Scott Fitzgerald is worth reading—and because it is the only published novel of a brave and talented woman who is remembered for her defeats." However, in the wake of Milford's biography, a new perspective emerged, and scholar Jacqueline Tavernier-Courbin wrote in 1979: "Save Me the Waltz is a moving and fascinating novel which should be read on its own terms equally as much as Tender Is the Night. It needs no other justification than its comparative excellence." After Milford's 1970 biography, Save Me the Waltz became the focus of many literary studies that explored different aspects of her work: how the novel contrasted with Scott's depiction of their marriage in Tender Is the Night, and how the consumer culture that emerged in the 1920s placed stress on modern women.

In 1991, Zelda's collected writings including Save Me the Waltz were edited by Matthew J. Bruccoli and published. Reviewing the collection, The New York Times literary critic Michiko Kakutani wrote "that the novel was written in two months is amazing. That for all its flaws it still manages to charm, amuse and move the reader is even more remarkable. Zelda Fitzgerald succeeded, in this novel, in conveying her own heroic desperation to succeed at something of her own, and she also managed to distinguish herself as a writer with, as Edmund Wilson once said of her husband, a 'gift for turning language into something iridescent and surprising.'"

In addition to a critical reappraisal of her novel, Zelda's artwork also has been reappraised as interesting in its own right. After spending much of the 1950s and 1960s in family attics—Zelda's mother even had much of the art burned because she disliked it—her work drew the renewed interest of scholars. Posthumous exhibitions of her watercolors have toured the United States and Europe. A review of the exhibition by curator Everl Adair noted the influence of Vincent van Gogh and Georgia O'Keeffe on her paintings and concluded that her surviving corpus of art "represents the work of a talented, visionary woman who rose above tremendous odds to create a fascinating body of work—one that inspires us to celebrate the life that might have been."

Scholars continue to debate the role that Zelda and Scott may have had in inspiring and stifling each other's creativity. Biographer Sally Cline wrote that the two camps can be "as diametrically opposed as the Plath and Hughes literary camps"—a reference to the heated controversy about the relationship of husband–wife poets Ted Hughes and Sylvia Plath. In particular, partisan scholars of Zelda frequently depict Scott Fitzgerald as a domineering husband who drove his wife insane.

In response to this narrative, Zelda's daughter Scottie Fitzgerald wrote an essay dispelling such "inaccurate" interpretations. She particularly objected to revisionist depictions of her mother as "the classic 'put down' wife, whose efforts to express her artistic nature were thwarted by a typically male chauvinist husband". In contrast, Scottie insisted "that my father greatly appreciated and encouraged his wife's unusual talents and ebullient imagination. Not only did he arrange for the first showing of her paintings in New York in 1934 he sat through long hours of rehearsals of her one play, Scandalabra, staged by a Little Theater group in Baltimore; he spent many hours editing the short stories she sold to College Humor and to Scribner's Magazine." Towards the end of her life, Scottie wrote a final coda about her parents to a biographer: "I have never been able to buy the notion that it was my father's drinking which led her to the sanitarium. Nor do I think she led him to the drinking."

== Legacy and influence ==
Zelda was the inspiration for "Witchy Woman", the song of seductive enchantresses written by Don Henley and Bernie Leadon for the Eagles, after Henley read Zelda's biography; of the muse, the partial genius behind her husband F. Scott Fitzgerald, described by Tate as the quintessential "flapper" of the Jazz Age.

Zelda's name served as inspiration for Princess Zelda, the eponymous character of The Legend of Zelda series of video games.

In 2003, a wild turkey which roamed Battery Park in New York City was named Zelda due to a famous episode when, during one of her nervous breakdowns, she went missing and was found in Battery Park, apparently having walked several miles downtown.

In 1989, the F. Scott and Zelda Fitzgerald museum opened in Montgomery, Alabama. The museum is in a house they briefly rented in 1931 and 1932. It is one of the few places where some of Zelda's paintings are kept on display.

In 1992, Zelda and her daughter Scottie were posthumously inducted into the Alabama Women's Hall of Fame.

In 2013, Therese Fowler published the biographical novel Z: A Novel of Zelda Fitzgerald, which follows Zelda through her marriage to F. Scott Fitzgerald, their writing careers and relationship with Ernest Hemingway, the upbringing of their daughter Scottie, and Zelda's declining mental health and death. The novel was adapted into the television series Z: The Beginning of Everything, created by Dawn Prestwich and Nicole Yorkin for Amazon Studios, which premiered in 2015 and starred Christina Ricci as Zelda. The first (and only) season depicted the period of the couple's courtship and early marriage.

In 2023, Hatteras Sky and Lark Hotels planned three boutique hotels in Asheville, North Carolina, two of which will have Zelda Fitzgerald themes. Zelda Dearest, with 20 rooms, will have the "beauty and optimism" of Zelda's early life. Zelda Salon, named for Gertrude Stein's home in France, will have 35 rooms, with the design based on where the Fitzgeralds stayed in the 1920s.

The musical Beautiful Little Fool debuted in January 2026 at the Southwark Playhouse (London), based on the lives of Zelda and F. Scott Fitzgerald, as told through the eyes of their daughter, Scottie (written by Mona Mansour, with music and lyrics by Hannah Corneau).
