= Hannah Corneau =

Actress

Hannah Corneau is a musical theatre actress, composer and lyricist.

Corneau's acting credits include Elphaba in Wicked on Broadway, Elsa in Frozen at The Muny, Edna St. Vincent Millay in Renascence, and Yitzhak in Hedwig and The Angry Inch.

Corneau is the composer and lyricist for the musical Beautiful Little Fool (based on the lives of Zelda and F. Scott Fitzgerald, told through the eyes of their adult daughter, Scottie), with book written by Mona Mansour. The musical premiered at the off West End Southwark Playhouse Borough in London in January 2026, with Corneau playing Zelda.

She grew up in New York and graduated from Syracuse University in 2011 with a musical theatre degree.
