= Nancy Milford =

American biographer (1938–2022)

- Born: Nancy Lee Winston; March 26, 1938; Dearborn, Michigan, U.S.
- Died: March 29, 2022 (aged 84); New York City, U.S.
- Education: University of Michigan (BA); Columbia University (MA, DPhil)
- Occupation: Biographer
- Notable work: Zelda (1970); Savage Beauty: The Life of Edna St. Vincent Millay (2001)
- Spouse: Kenneth Milford
- Children: 3

Nancy Lee Milford (née Winston; March 26, 1938 – March 29, 2022) was an American biographer. She was noted for her biographies on Zelda Fitzgerald and Edna St. Vincent Millay.

== Early life and education ==
Nancy Lee Winston was born in Dearborn, Michigan, on March 26, 1938. Her father, Joseph Winston, worked as an engineer at General Motors and served in the United States Navy during World War II; her mother, Vivienne (Romaine), was a housewife and volunteered at a Dearborn hospital. During her father's stint in the Navy, the family relocated to Washington, D.C., and San Francisco before going back to Michigan.

Milford studied English at the University of Michigan, graduating with a bachelor's degree in 1959. After a one-year sojourn in Europe, she undertook postgraduate studies at Columbia University, obtaining a master's degree in 1964 and a Doctor of Philosophy in 1972. Her dissertation was on Zelda Fitzgerald.

== Career ==
Milford was best known for her book Zelda about F. Scott Fitzgerald's wife Zelda Fitzgerald. The book started out as her master's thesis and was published to broad acclaim in 1970. It was a finalist for the National Book Award, spent 29 weeks on The New York Times best-seller list, and was eventually translated into 17 languages.

Savage Beauty: The Life of Edna St. Vincent Millay was published in 2001. This was ultimately the final book Milford published. She began working on a biography of Rose Kennedy, but decided to halt her progress.

While considering writing to be her primary career, Milford also taught at the University of Michigan, Princeton University, Brown University, Vassar College, New York University, Bennington College, Briarcliff College, and Bard College. She became a visiting professor at Hunter College and went on to join the permanent faculty there as a distinguished lecturer. Six years later, she was named the first executive director of the Leon Levy Center for Biography at the Graduate Center, CUNY.

=== Awards and honors ===
Milford was an Annenberg Fellow at Brown University and a Woodrow Wilson Visiting Fellow. She was a Fulbright scholar in Turkey in 1996 and 1999, as well as a Guggenheim Fellow in 1977. She was honored as a Literary Lion at the New York Public Library in 1984.

=== Writers Room ===
The Writers Room is the name of a workspace in New York City that was first founded in 1978 by Nancy Milford and several others then working on books in the Frederick Lewis Allen Room at the New York Public Library. The workspace serves as a place where, for a fee, writers can work on their project and have access to reference materials and fellow writers. The group came up with the idea because the rules of the Allen Room required them to leave for a brief period each year (to allow others a chance to use the limited space) and there was demand for an alternative space with no such restrictions. The location of The Writers Room has moved several times since its launch in order to accommodate new members.

The workspace originally started with 22 members, each donating $100 towards the rental of the initial room, but had expanded to more than 300 members as of 1999.

=== Books ===
- Zelda, 1970. A biography of Zelda Fitzgerald. ISBN 9780060910693
- Contributor, Adrienne Rich's Poetry, 1975
- Savage Beauty: The Life of Edna St. Vincent Millay, 2001. ISBN 9781588360946
- Editor and author of the introduction, The Selected Poetry of Edna St. Vincent Millay, 2001. ISBN 9780679642374

== Personal life ==
Milford married Kenneth Milford in 1962. The couple had three children. They eventually divorced. Milford died on March 29, 2022, at her home in New York City three days after her 84th birthday, but no cause of death was disclosed.

== See also ==
- Arthur Mizener, Fitzgerald's first biographer
- Andrew W. Turnbull, Fitzgerald's second biographer
- Matthew J. Bruccoli, Fitzgerald biographer
- Maureen Corrigan, Fitzgerald scholar and essayist
