= Arthur Mizener =

American professor (1907–1988)

- Born: Arthur Moore Mizener; September 3, 1907; Erie, Pennsylvania
- Died: February 15, 1988 (aged 80); Bristol, Rhode Island
- Education: Princeton University; Harvard University
- Occupation: Biographer
- Years active: 1951–1975
- Notable work: The Far Side of Paradise (1951)
- Spouse: Rosemary Paris
- Children: 1

Arthur Moore Mizener (September 3, 1907 – February 15, 1988) was an American professor of English, literary critic, and biographer. After graduating from Princeton, Mizener obtained his master's degree from Harvard. From 1951 until his retirement in 1975, he was Mellon Foundation Professor of English at Cornell University. In 1951, Mizener published the first biography of Jazz Age writer F. Scott Fitzgerald titled The Far Side of Paradise.

In addition to authoring the first biography of Fitzgerald, Mizener proposed the now popular interpretations of Fitzgerald's magnum opus The Great Gatsby as a criticism of the American Dream and the character of Jay Gatsby as the dream's false prophet. He popularized these interpretations in a series of talks titled "The Great Gatsby and the American Dream."

Although Mizener's biography became a commercial success, Fitzgerald's friends such as critic Edmund Wilson believed the work distorted Scott and Zelda Fitzgerald's relationship and personalities for the worse. Consequently, scholars deemed Andrew Turnbull's 1962 biography Scott Fitzgerald to be a significant correction of the biographical record.

In 1971, Mizener released a biography about writer Ford Madox Ford titled The Saddest Story: A Biography of Ford Madox Ford that received critical acclaim but did not achieve the same commercial success. He later wrote a supplemental Fitzgerald biography titled Scott Fitzgerald And His World. He died on February 15, 1988, at the age of 80.

== Biography ==
Born on September 3, 1907, in Erie, Pennsylvania, he was the son of Mason Price and Mabel Moore Mizener, who married in Cuyahoga, Ohio. After graduating from Princeton University—Fitzgerald's alma mater—Mizener obtained his master's degree from Harvard University before returning to Princeton to receive his doctorate in 1934. After teaching at Yale University; Wells College in Aurora, New York; and Carleton College in Northfield, Minnesota, he joined Cornell's faculty in 1951. From then until his retirement in 1975, he was Mellon Foundation Professor of English at Cornell University.

The last two pages of the book make overt Gatsby's embodiment of the American dream as a whole by identifying his attitude with the awe of the Dutch sailors when, "for a transitory enchanted moment," they found "something commensurate to [their] capacity for wonder" in the "fresh, green breast of the new world." Though this commitment to the wonder and the enchantment of a dream is qualified by the dream's unreality, by its "year by year reced[ing] before us," the dream is still the book's only positive good; the rest is a world of "foul dust," like the "valley of ashes — a fantastic farm where ashes grow like wheat in ridges and hills and gardens" — through which one passed every evening on his way to the night world of East and West Egg.

— Arthur Mizener, The Far Side of Paradise (1951)

In 1951, Mizener published the first biography of Fitzgerald titled The Far Side of Paradise. The title alludes to Fitzgerald's debut novel, This Side of Paradise (1920). In his biography, Mizener became the first scholar to interpret Fitzgerald's novel The Great Gatsby in the context of the American Dream. "The last two pages of the book," Mizener wrote, "make overt Gatsby's embodiment of the American Dream as a whole by identifying his attitude with the awe of the Dutch sailors" when first glimpsing the New World. He noted Fitzgerald emphasized the dream's unreality and viewed the dream as "ridiculous." Mizener popularized his interpretations of the novel in a series of talks titled "The Great Gatsby and the American Dream."

Although Mizener's biography proved a commercial success and increased Fitzgerald's posthumous fame, Fitzgerald's close friends such as critic Edmund Wilson argued that the book's anecdotes distorted Scott and Zelda's relationship and personalities for the worse. "Arthur Mizener had never known Fitzgerald," Wilson wrote, "and did not in certain respects perhaps very well understand him." Despite these distortions, Fitzgerald's acquaintance Budd Schulberg commented that Mizener's biography made "credible the almost incredible life of a man who had the world at his feet when he was 25 and at his throat when he was 40."

After the release of his 1951 biography, a blind Max Gerlach—the primary inspiration for Fitzgerald's literary character of Jay Gatsby—attempted to contact Mizener. Gerlach sought to communicate to Mizener that he had inspired the character of Gatsby. Wrongly believing Gatsby to be an entirely fictional character, Mizener declined to speak with Gerlach.

In 1971, two decades later, Mizener released another biography titled The Saddest Story: A Biography of Ford Madox Ford that received critical acclaim but did not achieve the same commercial success. Among his many other works, he wrote a supplemental Fitzgerald biography titled Scott Fitzgerald And His World. The novel, The Valley of Bones, by Anthony Powell is dedicated to Mizener. On February 15, 1988, Mizener died of congestive heart failure at a nursing home in Bristol, Rhode Island, at the age of 80.

== Publications ==
=== Volumes ===
- The Far Side of Paradise: A Biography of F. Scott Fitzgerald (Houghton Mifflin, 1951)
- The Saddest Story: A Biography of Ford Madox Ford (Putnam, 1971)
- Scott Fitzgerald And His World (Putnam, 1972)

=== Articles ===
- "Gatsby, 35 Years Later" (The New York Times, April 24, 1960)
- "Evaluating an Author's Vision of the Thirties" (The New York Times, December 10, 1962)

== See also ==
- Andrew W. Turnbull, Fitzgerald's second biographer and close friend
- Matthew J. Bruccoli, Fitzgerald biographer and friend of Scottie Fitzgerald
- Nancy Milford, Zelda Sayre Fitzgerald's first biographer
- Maureen Corrigan, Fitzgerald scholar and essayist
