= Matthew J. Bruccoli =

American writer, editor and literary historian

- Born: Matthew Joseph Bruccoli; August 21, 1931; The Bronx, New York
- Died: June 4, 2008 (aged 76); Columbia, South Carolina
- Education: Cornell University; Yale University; University of Virginia
- Occupation: Professor of Literature
- Years active: 1968–2008
- Notable work: Some Sort of Epic Grandeur: The Life of F. Scott Fitzgerald (1981)
- Spouse: Arlyn Firkins
- Children: 4

Matthew Joseph Bruccoli (August 21, 1931 – June 4, 2008) was an American professor of English at the University of South Carolina. He was an expert on F. Scott Fitzgerald; his biography of Fitzgerald, published in 1981, was considered the standard biography for decades. He also wrote about other writers, including Ernest Hemingway, Thomas Wolfe, and John O'Hara, and was editor of the Dictionary of Literary Biography.

== Early life and education ==
Matthew Joseph Bruccoli was born in 1931 in The Bronx, New York to Joseph Bruccoli and Mary Gervasi. He graduated from the Bronx High School of Science in 1949. He studied at Cornell University, where one of his professors was the noted author Vladimir Nabokov, and at Yale University. On campus, he was a founding member of the fledgling Manuscript Society, graduating in 1953. In 1960, he received a PhD in English literature studies from the University of Virginia, where he was supervised by Fredson Bowers.

Bruccoli's interest in F. Scott Fitzgerald began in 1947 when he heard a radio broadcast of Fitzgerald's short story "The Diamond as Big as the Ritz". That week he tracked down a copy of The Great Gatsby, he told interviewers, "and I have been reading it ever since."

== Career ==
Bruccoli taught at the University of Virginia and the Ohio State University early in his career. He settled at the University of South Carolina, where he earned tenure and taught for four decades. He lived in Columbia, South Carolina, where, according to his New York Times obituary, he "cut a dash on campus, instantly recognizable by his vintage red Mercedes convertible, Brooks Brothers suits, Groucho mustache and bristling crew cut that dated to his Yale days. His untamed Bronx accent also set him apart."

Over the course of his career, Bruccoli wrote more than fifty critical books on F. Scott Fitzgerald and other literary figures. His 1981 biography of Fitzgerald, Some Sort of Epic Grandeur: The Life of F. Scott Fitzgerald, is considered the standard Fitzgerald biography. He has edited many of Fitzgerald's works, from This Side of Paradise to Fitzgerald's unfinished final novel, The Last Tycoon. It had first been published posthumously in 1941. Edited by Bruccoli, it was published in a new version in 1993 as The Love of the Last Tycoon, part of a collection by Cambridge University Press. Bruccoli also edited Zelda Fitzgerald's only novel Save Me the Waltz; she was married to Scott.

While studying Fitzgerald, Bruccoli and his wife Arlyn began to collect all manner of Fitzgerald memorabilia. Bruccoli owned the artist's copy of "Celestial Eyes", the cover art by Francis Cugat which appeared on the cover of the first edition, and most modern editions, of The Great Gatsby. In 1969, Bruccoli befriended Frances "Scottie" Fitzgerald, the daughter of the Fitzgeralds. In 1976, Bruccoli and Scottie Fitzgerald Smith published The Romantic Egoists, from the scrapbooks that F. Scott and Zelda had maintained. These had included numerous photographs and book reviews. Later in life, Bruccoli and his wife donated their collection to the Thomas Cooper Library at University of South Carolina. The collection is valued at nearly $2 million.

Bruccoli was general editor of the Pittsburgh Series in Bibliography, published by the University of Pittsburgh Press. As part of this series, he produced F. Scott Fitzgerald: A Descriptive Bibliography and, with Richard Layman, Ring W. Lardner: A Descriptive Bibliography (1976). Bruccoli had written a working draft of the Lardner book in the summer of 1973 before giving it "to his then-graduate-research-assistant Layman to work on checking it. Layman displayed so much aptitude for the assignment that a collaboration seemed obligatory." In 1983, Bruccoli published Ross Macdonald / Kenneth Millar: A Descriptive Bibliography in the Pittsburgh Series in Bibliography.

Along with Layman, who became recognized as a Dashiell Hammett scholar, and businessman C. E. Frazer Clark Jr., Bruccoli launched the Dictionary of Literary Biography. The 400-volume reference work contains biographies of more than 12,000 literary figures from antiquity to modern times. In 1962, the firm of Bruccoli Clark Layman was formed to design and publish books. One of the books it produced was A True Likeness: The Black South of Richard Samuel Roberts 1920-1936, published in 1986. It contained photographs printed from glass negatives discovered under the Roberts house in Columbia though the work of University of South Carolina South Caroliniana Library field archivist Thomas L. Johnson with the cooperation of the Roberts family. A True Likeness won Johnson and co-author Philip C. Dunn the 1987 Lillian Smith Book Award.

Among the glass negatives found under the house was one of a young Modjeska Monteith Simkins. During the preservation of the Modjeska Monteith Simkins House, Catherine Fleming Bruce worked with Bruccoli for permission to have a portrait of Simkins created directly from the glass plates, for display in the Simkins House.

== Personal life ==
Bruccoli married Arlyn Firkins on October 5, 1957. They had four children: Mary, Joseph, Josephine Owens, and Arlyn Bruccoli.

== Death ==
Bruccoli continued working at the University of South Carolina until being diagnosed with a brain tumor. He died on June 4, 2008.

== Selected works ==
- The Profession of Authorship in America, 1800-1870: The Papers of William Charvat (1968)
- Raymond Chandler. A Checklist (1968)
- Fitzgerald/Hemingway Annual (1969-79) editor
- Ernest Hemingway, Cub Reporter: Kansas City Star Stories (1970) editor
- F. Scott Fitzgerald in His Own Time. A Miscellany (1971) editor with Jackson R. Bryer
- John O’Hara. A Checklist (1972)
- F. Scott Fitzgerald. A Descriptive Bibliography (1972)
- Ernest Hemingway’s Apprenticeship: Oak Park, 1916-1917 (1972) editor
- As Ever, Scott-Fitz: Letters Between Scott Fitzgerald and His Literary Agent, Harold Ober 1919-1940 (1972) editor
- Chandler Before Marlowe: Raymond Chandler’s Early Prose and Poetry, 1908-1912 (1973)
- The Chief Glory of Every People: Essays on Classic American Writers (1973) editor
- The Romantic Egoists: A Pictorial Autobiography from the Scrapbooks and Albums of F. Scott and Zelda Fitzgerald (1974)
- Reconquest of Mexico: An Amiable Journey in Pursuit of Cortés (1974)
- Ring W. Lardner. A Descriptive Bibliography (1976)
- Scott and Ernest: The Authority of Failure and the Authority of Success (1978)
- Selected Letters of John O’Hara (1978) editor
- John O’Hara. A Descriptive Bibliography (1978)
- James Gould Cozzens: New Acquist of True Experience (1979) editor
- The Price Was High: The Last Uncollected Stories of F. Scott Fitzgerald (1979) editor
- Correspondence of F. Scott Fitzgerald (1980) editor with Margaret M. Duggan
- Some Sort of Epic Grandeur: The Life of F. Scott Fitzgerald (1981; revised edition 2002)
- James Cozzens. A Descriptive Bibliography (1981)
- James Gould Cozzens: A Life Apart (1983)
- Ross Macdonald (1984)
- New Essays on the Great Gatsby (1985) editor
- Nelson Algren. A Descriptive Bibliography (1985)
- New Essays on The Great Gatsby (1985) editor
- The Fortunes of Mitchell Kennerley, Bookman (1986)
- The Short Stories of F. Scott Fitzgerald (1989) editor
- Vladimir Nabokov: Selected Letters 1940-1977 (1989) editor
- James Dickey. A Bibliography (1990) editor with Judith S. Baughman
- The Collected Writings of Zelda Fitzgerald (1991) editor
- The Great Gatsby: The Cambridge Edition of the Works of F. Scott Fitzgerald (1991) editor
- Ring Around the Bases: The Complete Baseball Stories of Ring Lardner (1992) editor
- The Love of the Last Tycoon. A Western: The Cambridge Edition of the Works of F. Scott Fitzgerald (1993) editor
- F. Scott Fitzgerald: A Life in Letters (1994) editor with Judith S. Baughman
- Modern Classic Writers: Essential Bibliography of American Fiction (1994) editor with Judith S. Baughman
- Modern African American Writers: Essential Bibliography of American Fiction (1994) editor with Judith S. Baughman
- Fitzgerald and Hemingway. A Dangerous Friendship (1994)
- F. Scott Fitzgerald on Authorship (1996) editor with Judith S. Baughman
- The Only Thing That Counts: The Ernest Hemingway-Maxwell Perkins Correspondence 1925-1947 (1996) editor
- Classes on F. Scott Fitzgerald (2001)
- Conversations With F. Scott Fitzgerald (2003)
- The Sons of Maxwell Perkins: Letters of F. Scott Fitzgerald, Ernest Hemingway, Thomas Wolfe, and their Editor (2004) editor with Judith S. Baughman
- The Matthew J. and Arlyn Bruccoli Collection of F. Scott Fitzgerald at the University of South Carolina. An Illustrated Catalogue (2004)
- F. Scott Fitzgerald in the Marketplace: The Auction and Dealer Catalogues, 1935-2006 (2009) posthumous, editor with Judith S. Baughman
- On Books and Writers: Selected Essays (2010) posthumous, with John C. Unrue (ed.)

== See also ==
- Arthur Mizener, Fitzgerald's first biographer and friend of Matthew J. Bruccoli
- Andrew W. Turnbull, Fitzgerald's second biographer and friend of Mizener
- Nancy Milford, Zelda Sayre Fitzgerald's first biographer
- Maureen Corrigan, Fitzgerald scholar and essayist
