= Andrew Turnbull (biographer) =

American biographer (1921–1970)

- Andrew Turnbull in 1961
- Born: Andrew Winchester Turnbull; February 2, 1921; Baltimore, Maryland
- Died: January 10, 1970 (aged 48); Cambridge, Massachusetts
- Education: St. Andrew's School; Princeton University; Harvard University
- Occupation: Biographer
- Years active: 1956–1968
- Notable work: Scott Fitzgerald (1962); Thomas Wolfe (1968)
- Spouse: Joanne Johnson
- Children: 2

Andrew Winchester Turnbull (February 2, 1921 – January 10, 1970) was an American biographer, scholar, and essayist who wrote acclaimed biographies of novelists F. Scott Fitzgerald and Thomas Wolfe. Turnbull grew up in Baltimore, Maryland, and first met Fitzgerald when the author lived on his family's property in the 1930s. After graduating Princeton University and serving in the United States Navy during World War II, Turnbull obtained his doctorate from Harvard University. He taught literature at the Massachusetts Institute of Technology and Brown University. He committed suicide at age 48.

== Biography ==
Born on February 2, 1921, in Baltimore, Maryland, he was the son of architect Bayard Turnbull and Margaret Carroll Jones Turnbull. In 1932, an 11-year-old Turnbull met novelist F. Scott Fitzgerald when the author rented La Paix, an old house on the Turnbull family property. As a young man, Turnbull attended St. Andrew's School in Middletown, Delaware. Later, he graduated from Princeton University—Fitzgerald's alma mater—in 1942, where he was a member of the Colonial Club. He served in the United States Naval Reserve during World War II.

After the war, Turnbull worked with the Economic Cooperation Administration (ECA) in Paris for several years. He earned his doctorate in European history from Harvard University in 1954. He next pursued an academic vocation and worked as an instructor in the humanities at the Massachusetts Institute of Technology from 1954 to 1958.

After contributing two essays to The New Yorker on Fitzgerald at La Paix in 1956, Turnbull began work on a full-length life based on "firsthand experience, painstaking research, and extensive interviews." In contrast to Arthur Mizener's earlier biographical work, Turnbull sought to emphasize "Fitzgerald's character and personality over purely objective documentation of Fitzgerald's life."

In 1962, Turnbull published his acclaimed biography, Scott Fitzgerald, which the Associated Press lauded as "the best biography of the novelist." He followed this work with The Letters of F. Scott Fitzgerald in 1963. After receiving a Guggenheim Fellowship in 1964, he produced another highly praised biography about Fitzgerald's acquaintance and fellow novelist Thomas Wolfe in 1968.

At the time of his death, Turnbull was suffering from depression and had sought psychiatric help. At age 48, while a visiting professor at Brown University, he committed suicide via carbon monoxide poisoning in a closed garage at his Brattle Street home in Cambridge, Massachusetts, on January 10, 1970. He was survived by his wife, Joanne Johnson Turnbull, and their two daughters Joanne T. and Frances L. Turnbull.

== Publications ==
=== Volumes ===
- Scott Fitzgerald (Scribners, 1962)
- The Letters of F. Scott Fitzgerald (Scribners, 1963)
- Thomas Wolfe (Charles Scribner's Sons, 1968)

=== Articles ===
- "Scott Fitzgerald at La Paix" (The New Yorker, March 30, 1956)
- "Further Notes On Fitzgerald At La Paix" (The New Yorker, November 9, 1956)
- "The Last Buffoon" (The New York Times, July 22, 1962)
- "Perkins's Three Generals (The New York Times Book Review, July 16, 1967)

== See also ==
- Arthur Mizener, Fitzgerald's first biographer and a friend of Turnbull
- Matthew J. Bruccoli, Fitzgerald biographer and friend of Scottie Fitzgerald
- Nancy Milford, Zelda Sayre Fitzgerald's first biographer
- Maureen Corrigan, Fitzgerald scholar and essayist
