= This Side of Paradise =

1920 novel by F. Scott Fitzgerald

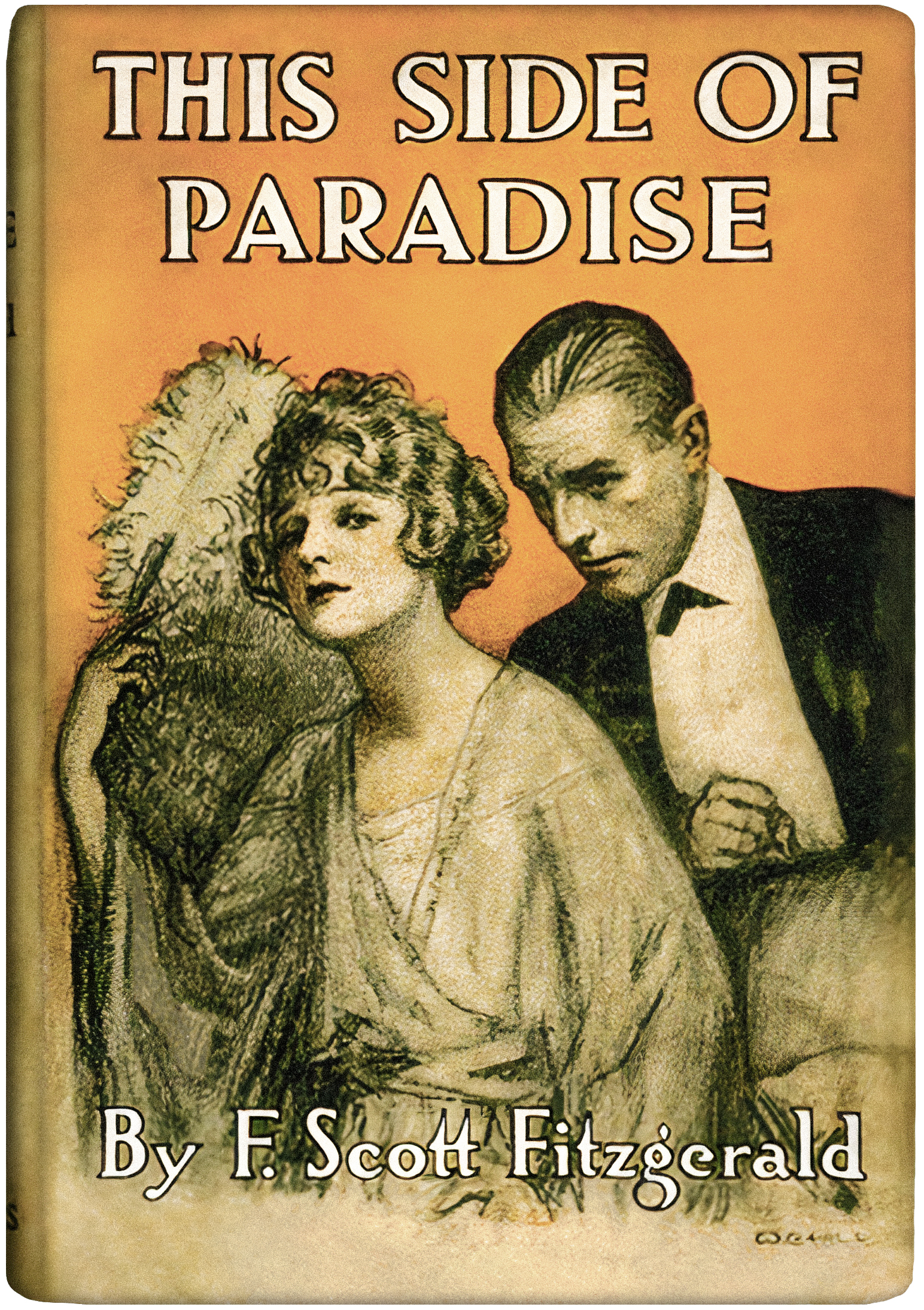
- Dust jacket cover of the first edition
- Author: F. Scott Fitzgerald
- Cover artist: W. E. Hill
- Language: English
- Genre: Bildungsroman
- Published: March 26, 1920
- Publisher: Charles Scribner's Sons
- Publication place: United States
- Media type: Print (hardcover & paperback)
- Followed by: The Beautiful and Damned (1922)
- Text: This Side of Paradise at Wikisource

This Side of Paradise is the 1920 debut novel by American writer F. Scott Fitzgerald. It examines the lives and morality of carefree American youth at the dawn of the Jazz Age. Its protagonist, Amory Blaine, is a handsome middle-class student at Princeton University who dabbles in literature and engages in a series of unfulfilling romances with young women. The novel explores themes of love warped by greed and social ambition. Fitzgerald, who took inspiration for the title from a line in Rupert Brooke's poem Tiare Tahiti, spent years revising the novel before Charles Scribner's Sons accepted it for publication.

Following its publication in March 1920, This Side of Paradise became a sensation in the United States, and reviewers hailed it as an outstanding debut novel. The book went through twelve printings and sold 49,075 copies. Although the book neither became one of the ten best-selling novels of the year nor made him wealthy, F. Scott Fitzgerald became a household name overnight. His newfound fame enabled him to earn higher rates for his short stories, and his improved financial prospects persuaded his fiancée Zelda Sayre to marry him. His novel became especially popular among young Americans, and the press depicted its 23-year-old author as the standard-bearer for "youth in revolt".

Although Fitzgerald wrote the novel about the youth culture of 1910s America, the work became popularly and inaccurately associated with the carefree social milieu of post-war 1920s America, and social commentators touted Fitzgerald as the first writer to turn the national spotlight on the younger Jazz Age generation, particularly their flappers. In contrast to the older Lost Generation to which Gertrude Stein posited that Ernest Hemingway and Fitzgerald belonged, the Jazz Age generation were younger Americans who had been adolescents during World War I and mostly untouched by the conflict's horrors. (Note: Fitzgerald argued that World War I neither created the Jazz Age nor influenced young Americans, asserting the conflict had no lasting impact.) Fitzgerald's novel riveted the nation's attention on the leisure activities of this hedonistic younger generation and sparked debate over their perceived immorality.

The novel created the widespread perception of Fitzgerald as a libertine chronicler of rebellious youth and proselytizer of Jazz Age hedonism which led reactionary societal figures to denounce the author and his work. These detractors regarded him as the outstanding aggressor in the rebellion of "flaming youth" against the traditional values of the "old guard". When Fitzgerald died in 1940, many social conservatives rejoiced. Due to this perception of Fitzgerald and his works, the Baltimore Diocese refused his family permission to bury him at St. Mary's Church in Rockville, Maryland.

== Plot summary ==
Here was a new generation, shouting the old cries, learning the old creeds, through a revery of long days and nights; destined finally to go out into that dirty gray turmoil to follow love and pride; a new generation dedicated more than the last to the fear of poverty and the worship of success; grown up to find all Gods dead, all wars fought, all faiths in man shaken.

— F. Scott Fitzgerald, This Side of Paradise (1920)

Amory Blaine, a young Midwesterner, believes that he has a great destiny, but the precise nature of this destiny eludes him. He attends a preparatory school where he becomes a football quarterback. He grows estranged from his eccentric mother Beatrice Blaine and becomes the protégé of Monsignor Thayer Darcy, a Catholic priest. During his sophomore year at Princeton, he returns to Minneapolis over Christmas break and falls in love with Isabelle Borgé, a wealthy debutante whom he first met as a boy. Amory and Isabelle embark upon a romance.

While at Princeton, Amory deluges Isabelle with letters, but she becomes disenchanted with him due to his criticism, and they break up on Long Island. Following their separation, Amory accompanies a Princeton classmate to an apartment occupied by two New York showgirls of easy virtue. He considers staying the night with the showgirls, but his conscience and an apparition compel him to leave. After four years at Princeton, he enlists in the United States Army amid World War I. He ships overseas to serve in the muddy trenches of the Western front. (Note: Fitzgerald forever regretted not serving in combat on the Western front during World War I, as detailed in his 1936 short story "I Didn't Get Over".) While overseas, his mother Beatrice dies, and most of his family's wealth disappears due to a series of failed investments.

After the armistice with Imperial Germany in November 1918, Amory settles in New York City amid the flowering of the Jazz Age. (Note: Fitzgerald settled in New York City amid the societal transformations of the Jazz Age, an era he described as racing "along under its own power, served by great filling stations full of money" and characterized by moral permissiveness, disillusionment with social norms, and an obsession with hedonism.) Rebounding from Isabelle, he becomes infatuated with Rosalind Connage, a cruel and narcissistic flapper. Desperate for a job, Amory obtains employment with an advertising agency but detests the work. His relationship with Rosalind deteriorates as she prefers a rival suitor, Dawson Ryder, a man of wealth and status. Rejected by Rosalind due to his lack of financial prospects, Amory quits his advertising job and goes on a drinking binge until the start of prohibition in the United States.

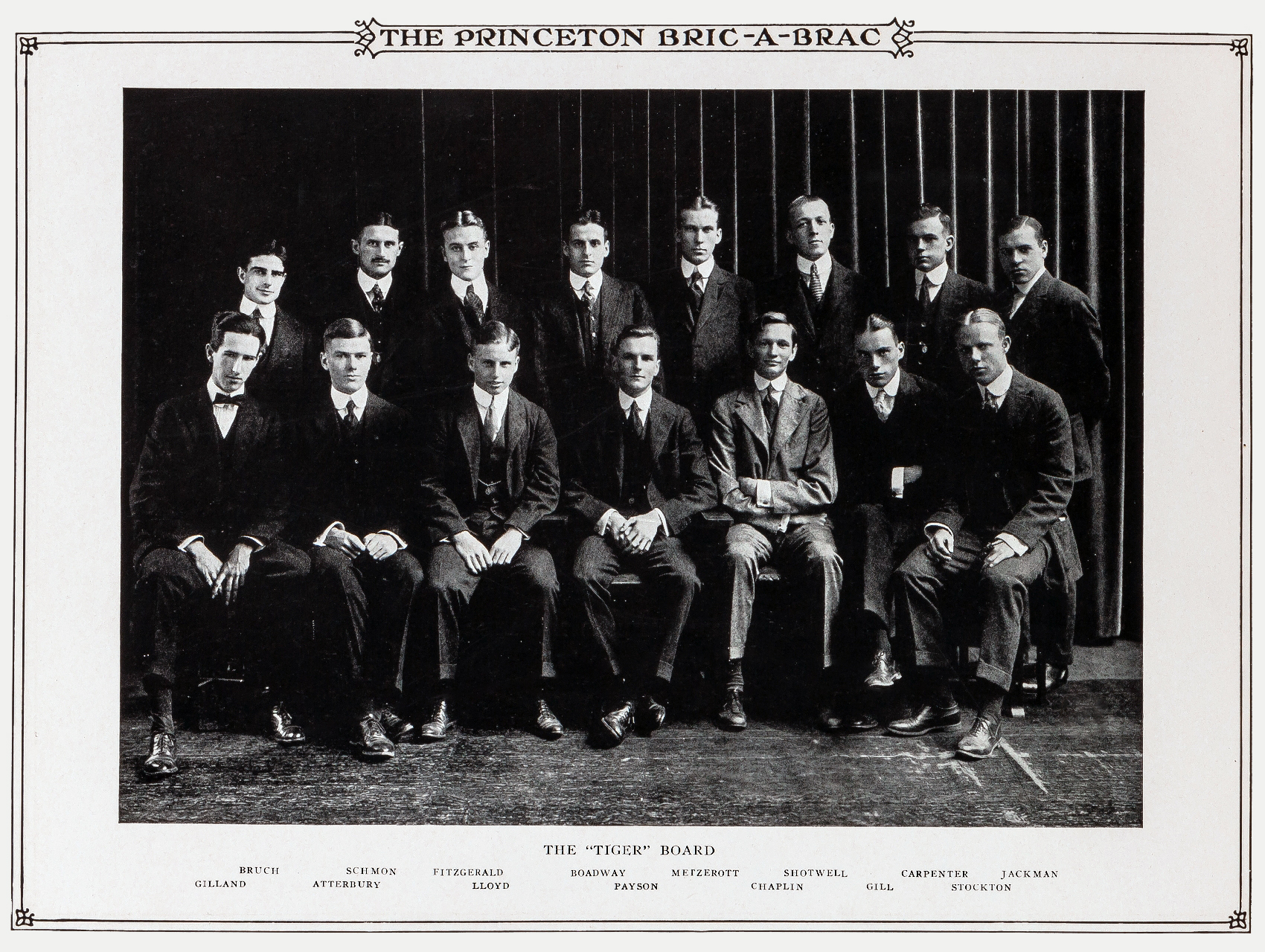
Fitzgerald among Princeton junior classmen in 1917. (Top row, third from the left)

When Amory travels to visit an uncle in Maryland, he meets Eleanor Savage, a beautiful and reckless atheist. Eleanor chafes under the religious conformity and gender limitations imposed on her by contemporary society in Wilsonian America. Amory and Eleanor spend a lazy summer conversing about love. On their final night together before Amory returns to New York City, Eleanor attempts suicide by riding her horse over a cliff in order to prove her disbelief in any deity. At the last moment, she leaps to safety as her horse plummets over the precipice, and Amory realizes that he does not love her.

Returning to New York City, Amory learns of Rosalind's engagement to his wealthy rival Dawson Ryder, and he declares that Rosalind is now dead to him. The death of his beloved mentor, Monsignor Darcy, further dispirits him. Homeless, Amory wanders from New York City to his alma mater Princeton. Accepting a car ride from a wealthy upper-class man driven by his working-class chauffeur in a Locomobile, Amory speaks out in favor of socialism in the United States—although he admits he is still formulating his thoughts as he is talking.

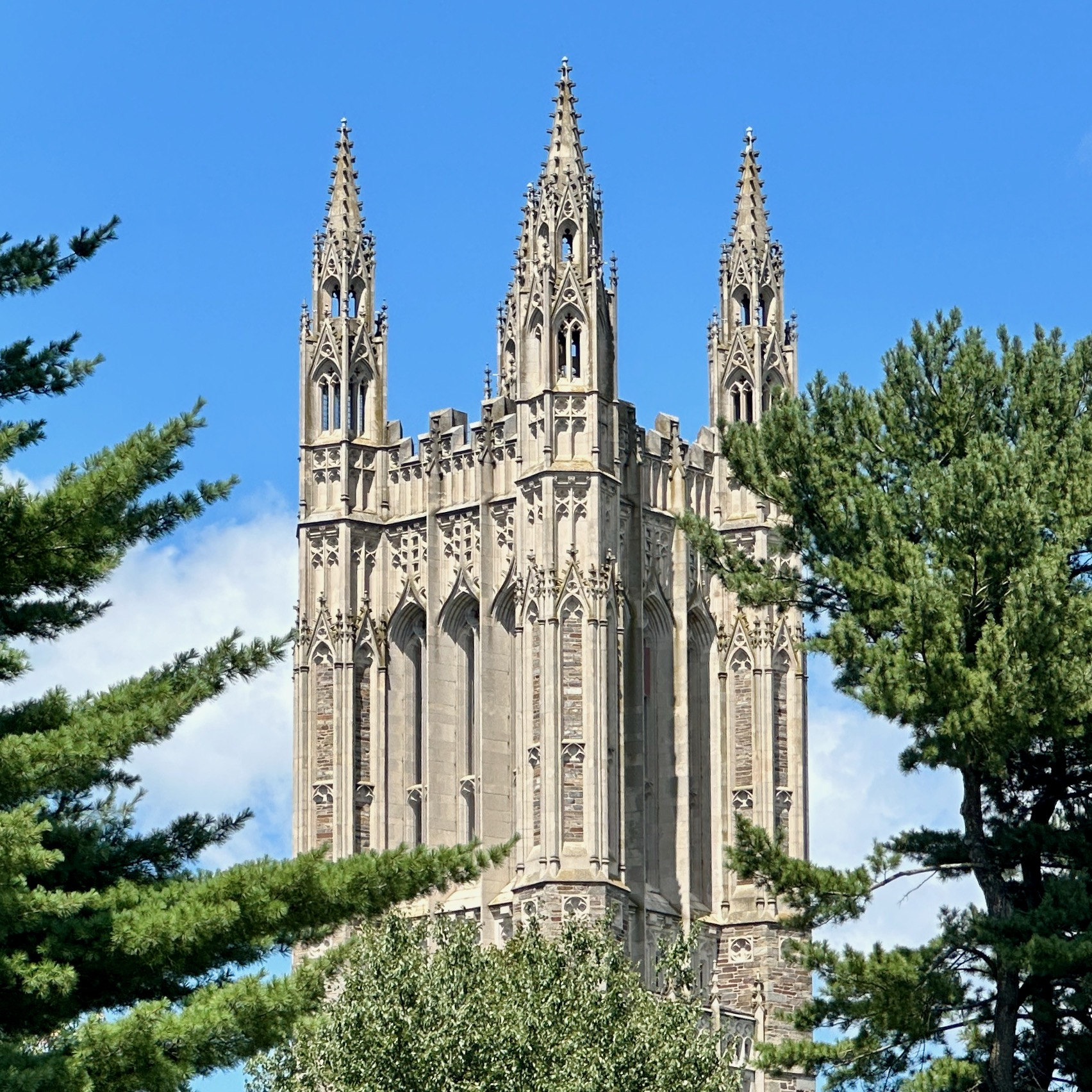
Princeton's gothic towers glimpsed by Amory in the final pages.

While riding in the Locomobile, Amory continues his argument about their time's societal ills and articulates his disillusionment with the current historical era. He announces his hope to stand alongside those in the younger generation and to bring forth a new age in America. Both the upper-class and working-class men in the car denounce his views, but when Amory discovers that the upper-class man is the father of a Princeton classmate who died in World War I, they reconcile. Amory parts ways with his travel companions, and the upper-class man tells him: "Good luck to you and bad luck to your theories."

Approaching Princeton, Amory recognizes his selfishness as well as his overindulgence in drink and beauty. He realizes that he must transcend these flaws to become a better man. Wandering through a graveyard at twilight, he reflects upon his inevitable mortality and finds solace in the fact that future generations may one day ponder his life. He thinks of the next generation—inheriting disillusionment and a loss of faith, yet still chasing love and success. After midnight, he stands alone gazing at Princeton's gothic towers and feels a newfound freedom. He stretches out his arms and proclaims, "I know myself . . . but that is all."

== Characters ==
I don't know what it is in me or that comes to me when I start to write. I am half feminine—at least my mind is.... Even my feminine characters are feminine Scott Fitzgeralds.

— F. Scott Fitzgerald, 1935

Fitzgerald based most of the novel's characters on persons from his life, although he often created composites and imbued his female characters with his own personality traits and thoughts.

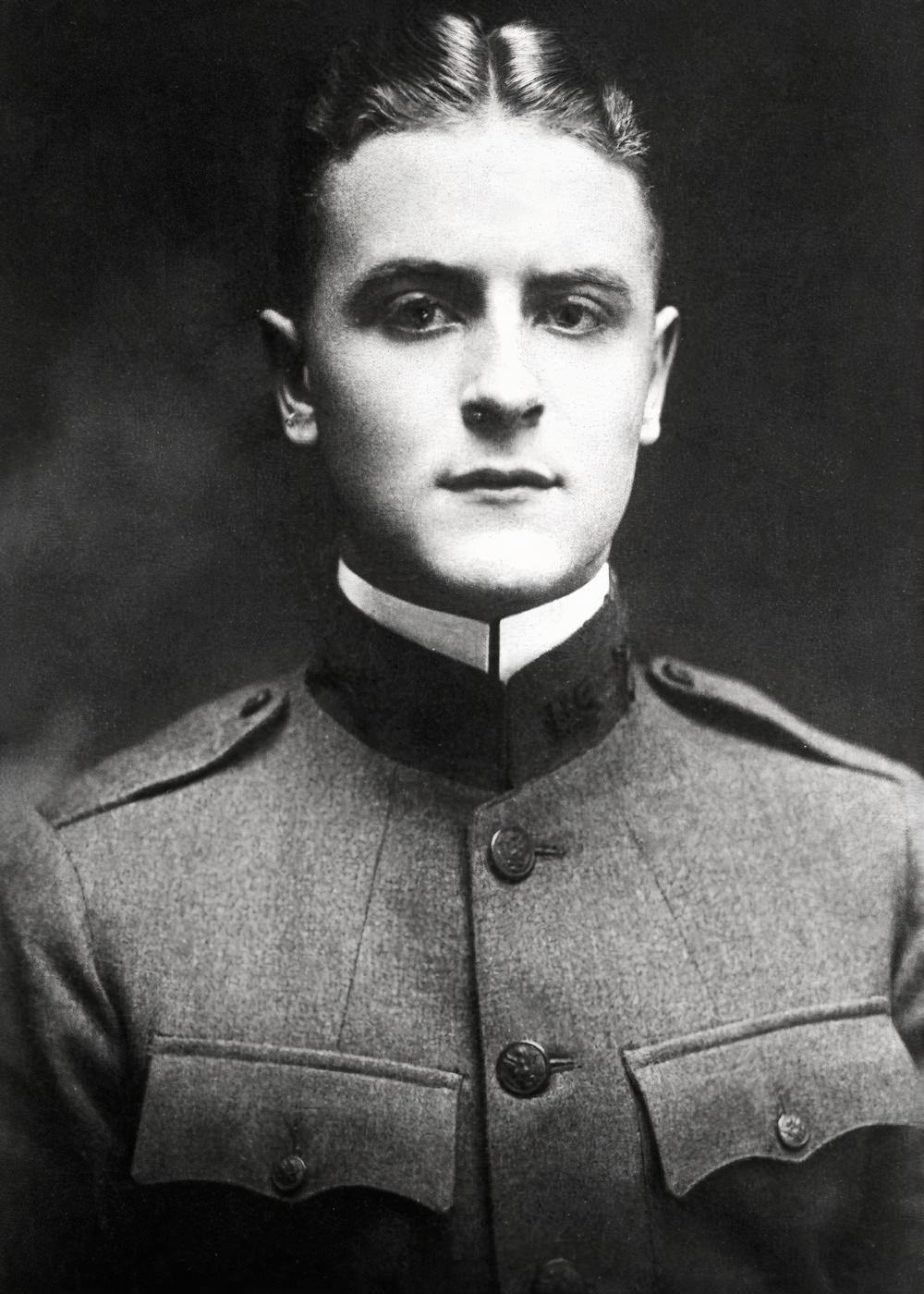
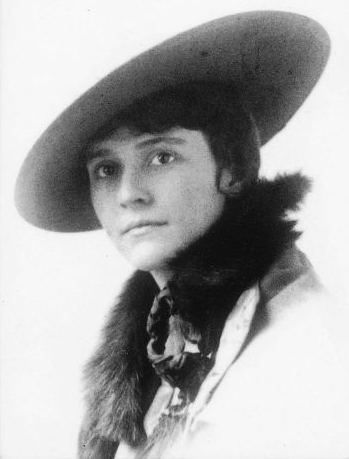
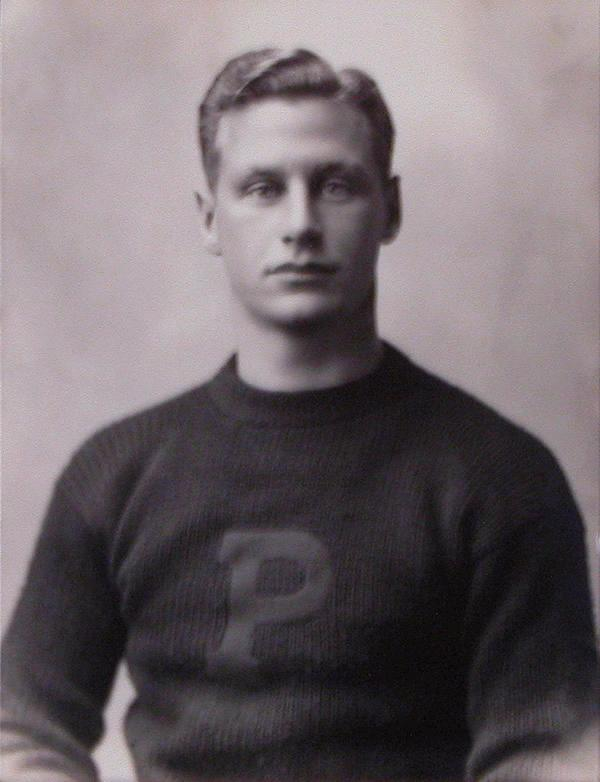
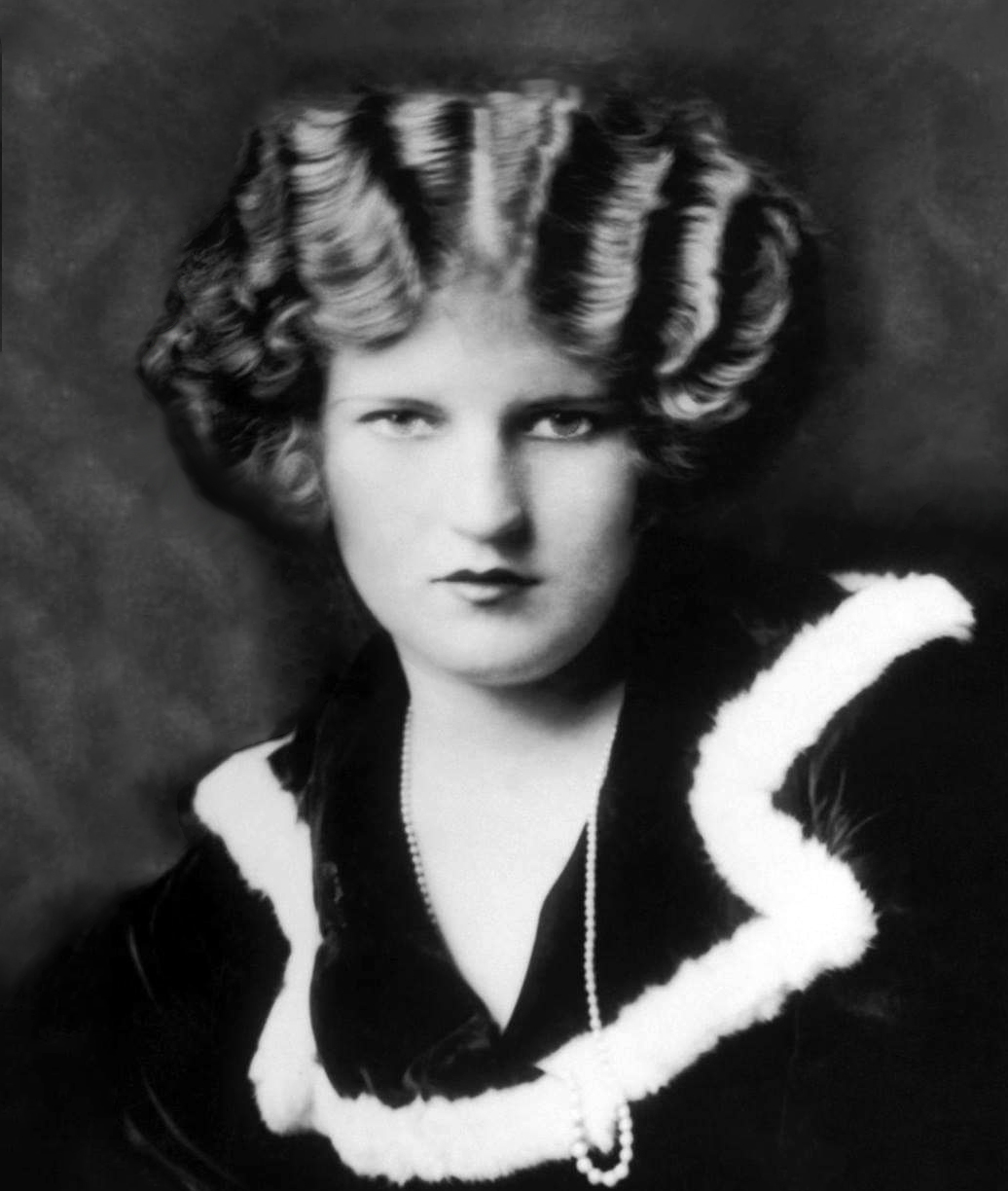
F. Scott Fitzgerald's (first) romance with Ginevra King (second) inspired the shallow character of Isabelle Borgé. Hobey Amory Baker (third), a Princeton football hero, inspired the protagonist's name "Amory" and the character of Allenby. Zelda Sayre (fourth) inspired the cruel and selfish character of Rosalind Connage.
- Amory Blaine – a handsome and egocentric young man, who has a series of unfulfilling romances with young women. Originally from the Midwest, he attends Princeton and later fights in World War I. Ambitious in a undefined way "I was planning to be such an important finger", he is compared to "Narcissus", is "completely lacking in all human sympathy", "cynical", and has a "tendency to pose". Amory spends much of his first two years at Princeton in a pursuit of a prestigious "club" (fraternity) membership. Courses do not interest him, except the "melancholy hexameters" and the "rigid clarity in solid geometry". At the end of the sophomore year he is "conditioned" and fails in the fall an important exam on "conic sections", which prevents his original plan "to be one of the gods of the class".

Fitzgerald based the character on an idealized version of himself and his disappointing romantic relationships. The name "Amory" derives from Fitzgerald's football hero at Princeton, Hobart Amory Baker.

- Isabelle Borgé – a wealthy and shallow debutante who is Amory's first love. Amory wonders whether she may "prove not too exotic a bloom", but he believes she is too beautiful to pass and starts a long-distance relationship, fueled by long love letters "in an eternal monotone" that required two "bulky envelopes". He then discovers that he has no real affection for her and that the liaison is only a pretense in a struggle for power "She mustn't lose the leadership a bit."

Ginevra King, a socialite upon whom Fitzgerald developed a life-long romantic obsession, inspired the character. Like Amory and Isabelle, an 18-year-old Fitzgerald fell in love with a 16-year-old King on Christmas break in Saint Paul, Minnesota, during his sophomore year at Princeton, and their relationship ended in a similar fashion. Rumors circulated that Ginevra had kissed dozens of boys, all of whom fell in love with her. "I was too thoughtless in those days," Ginevra recalled, "and too much in love with love to think of consequences." Until his death, Fitzgerald remained forever in love with King and "could not think of her without tears coming to his eyes".

- Rosalind Connage – a cruel and selfish flapper whom Amory romances. Amory has real affection for her (unlike for Isabelle). She cultivates expensive habits "I don't even do my own hair, usually.", is uninterested in family or children "I want to worry whether my legs will get slick and brown when I swim in the summer.", and sets her own price "Fifty-one shares, name, good- will, and everything goes at $25,000 a year.".

Fitzgerald based Rosalind on 18-year-old Zelda Sayre and, to a lesser extent, on the fictional character of Beatrice Normandy in H. G. Wells' 1909 novel Tono-Bungay. Mirroring Rosalind's materialistic relationship with Amory, Sayre ended her engagement with Fitzgerald due to his inability to support her privileged lifestyle as an idle Southern belle of Montgomery's country club set. She resumed their engagement on the condition that he would provide her with luxury.

- Eleanor Savage – a beautiful and reckless atheist whom Amory meets in a haystack in rural Maryland. She is exiled to rural MD by her Baltimore family and of "Bohemian naughtiness", "Oh, just one person in fifty has any glimmer of what sex is", she resents being "tied to the sinking ship of future matrimony". Amory and Eleanor recite Poe and Verlaine to each other, yet part "hating each other with a bitter sadness".

Fitzgerald partly based Eleanor on a purported love of his mentor Father Sigourney Fay, and, to a lesser extent, on 18-year-old Elizabeth Beckwith MacKie, a romantic interest he briefly knew. MacKie commented that the character "reminded me of how little he really knew me. His Eleanor loved to sit on a haystack in the rain reciting poetry. Forgive me, Scott: if that is the way you wanted it, then you missed the whole idea of what can happen atop a haystack."

- Thayer Darcy – a jovial and impious Catholic priest who serves as Amory's spiritual mentor. Father Sigourney Fay, a possibly gay Catholic priest with whom Fitzgerald had an intimate and ambiguous relationship, inspired the character. While writing This Side of Paradise, Fitzgerald quoted verbatim entire letters sent to him by Fay. In addition to using Fay's private correspondence, Fitzgerald drew on anecdotes that Fay had told him in confidence about his personal life, including his purported failed romances with women. When reading This Side of Paradise, Fay wrote to Fitzgerald that the unapproved use of these experiences told in confidence to the author "gave him a queer feeling."
- Beatrice Blaine – an aging and eccentric matron who is Amory's mother. Based on the mother of one of Fitzgerald's friends.
- Clara Page – a widowed older cousin for whom Amory has unrequited affection. Based on Fitzgerald's cousin Cecilia Delihant Taylor.
- Cecelia Connage – Rosalind's cynical younger sister who steals cigarettes and envies her sibling's popularity among young men.
- Thomas Parke D'Invilliers – a bespectacled and high-brow Princeton classmate who has a gift for poetry. Fitzgerald based D'Invilliers on his Princeton friend, poet John Peale Bishop. D'Invilliers becomes Amory's close friend and confidante in various subjects, among which are literature, love for young beauties, politics, and the meaning of the self. He becomes a journalist, developing his own perspectives apart from those he shares with Amory. The character reappears as a fictitious poet quoted on the title page of Fitzgerald's 1925 novel The Great Gatsby.
- Alec Connage – Rosalind's older brother and classmate of Amory at Princeton. Met by Amory later in Atlantic City NJ, with a ``Miss Jill" (real name Stella Robbins from NH) who was known to the hotel staff.
- Kerry Holiday – classmate at Princeton, volunteers in an aviation unit and dies in the war
- Burne Holiday – Kerry's younger brother, classmate at Princeton, becomes a pacifist
- Fred Sloane – classmate at Princeton, plays pitcher, careless and relaxed
- Dick Humbird – classmate at Princeton, dies in a car accident due to own recklessness
- Allenby – a heroic football captain at Princeton based on Hobey Baker. The national press praised Baker as one of the greatest athletes of his time, and he embodied everything Fitzgerald aspired to be as a Princeton undergraduate. He described Baker as "an ideal worthy of everything in my enthusiastic admiration, yet consummated and expressed in a human being who stood within ten feet of me." After graduating from Princeton in 1914, Baker enlisted in the U.S. Army Air Service amid World War I and died in a plane crash in December 1918.

== Background and composition ==
=== Love, war, and novel ambitions ===
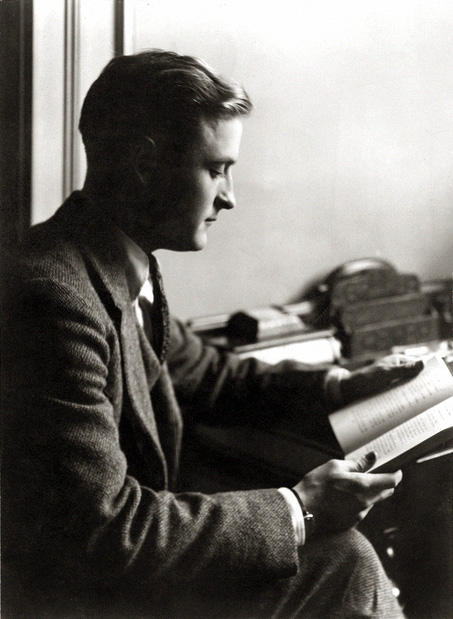
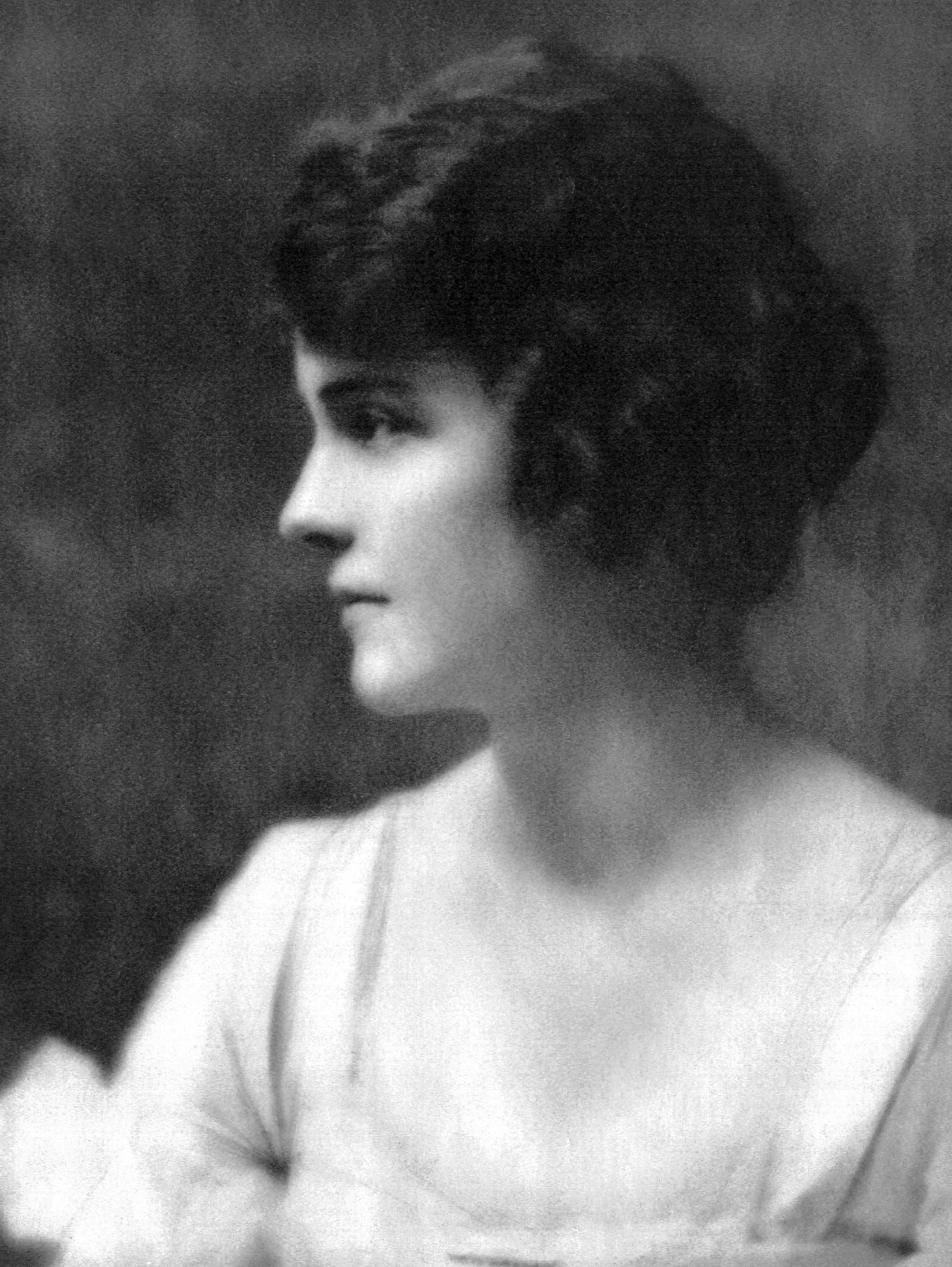
Fitzgerald circa 1920, the year his novel debuted, and socialite Ginevra King circa 1918

Since childhood, F. Scott Fitzgerald aspired to become a famous novelist. "Three months before I was born," Scott later wrote, "my mother lost her other two children... I think I started then to be a writer." While attending Princeton University, his passion for writing literature began to solidify into a career choice, and he wrote fiction as an undergraduate for the Princeton Triangle Club, the Princeton Tiger, and the Nassau Literary Review.

During his sophomore year at Princeton, Fitzgerald returned home to Saint Paul, Minnesota during Christmas break where the 18-year-old aspiring writer fell in love with 16-year-old Chicago debutante Ginevra King. They began a passionate romantic relationship spanning several years. Although Ginevra loved him, her upper-class family belittled Scott's courtship because of his lower-class status compared to her other wealthy suitors. Rejected by Ginevra as a suitable match, Fitzgerald enlisted in the United States Army amid World War I.

In November 1917, hoping to have a novel published before his deployment to Europe and his anticipated death in the trenches of World War I, Fitzgerald began writing a 120,000-word manuscript titled The Romantic Egotist. Having never before undertaken a novel, he relied upon H. G. Wells' 1909 novel Tono-Bungay and Sir Compton Mackenzie's 1913 novel Sinister Street as his literary templates. He sought to write the story of America's younger generation from the perspective of himself as a conscious observer. After obtaining a brief leave from the army in February 1918, Fitzgerald continued work on his unpublished manuscript at the University Cottage Club's library in Princeton. Eighty-one pages of this revised manuscript appeared in the final version of This Side of Paradise.

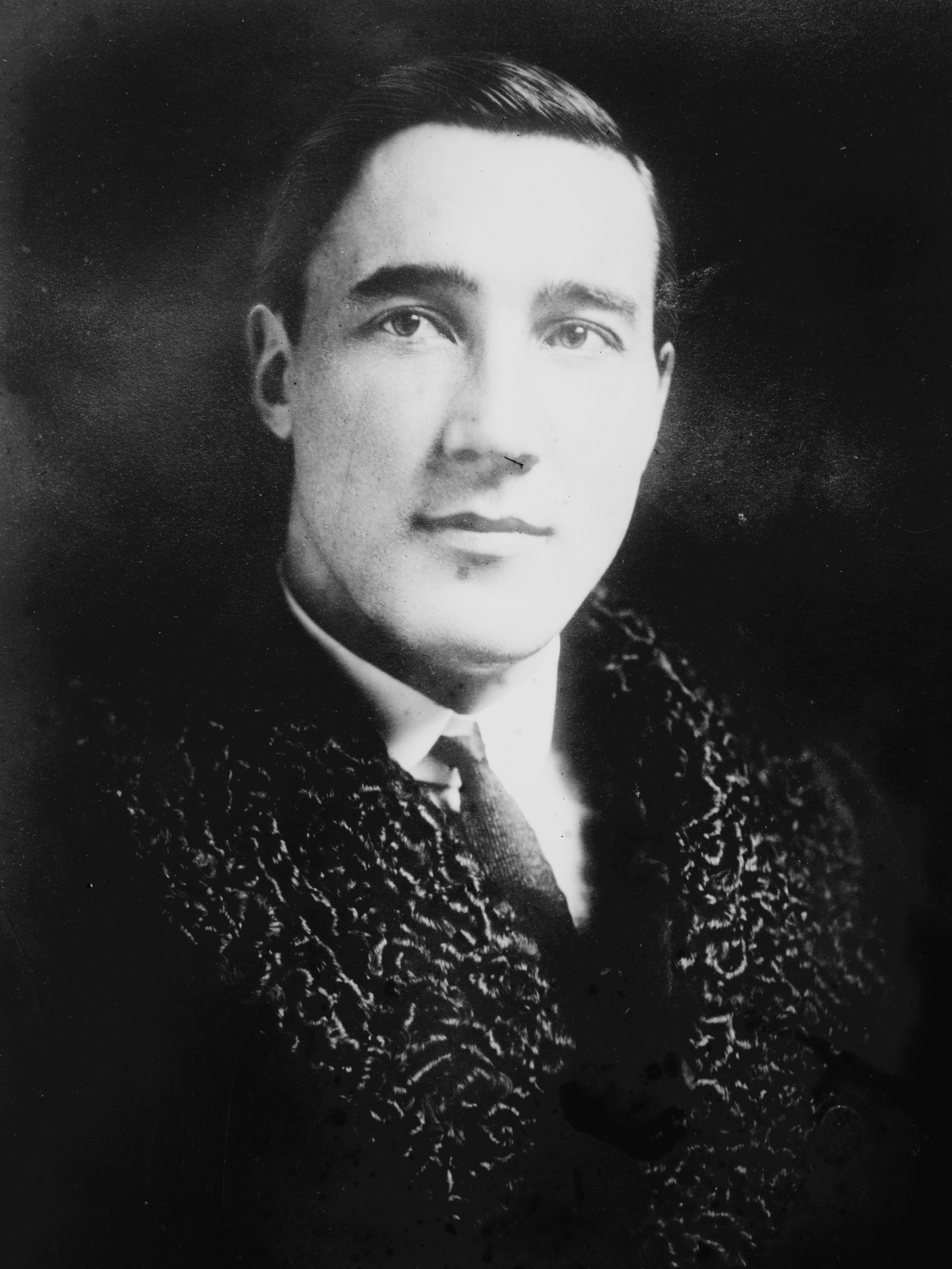
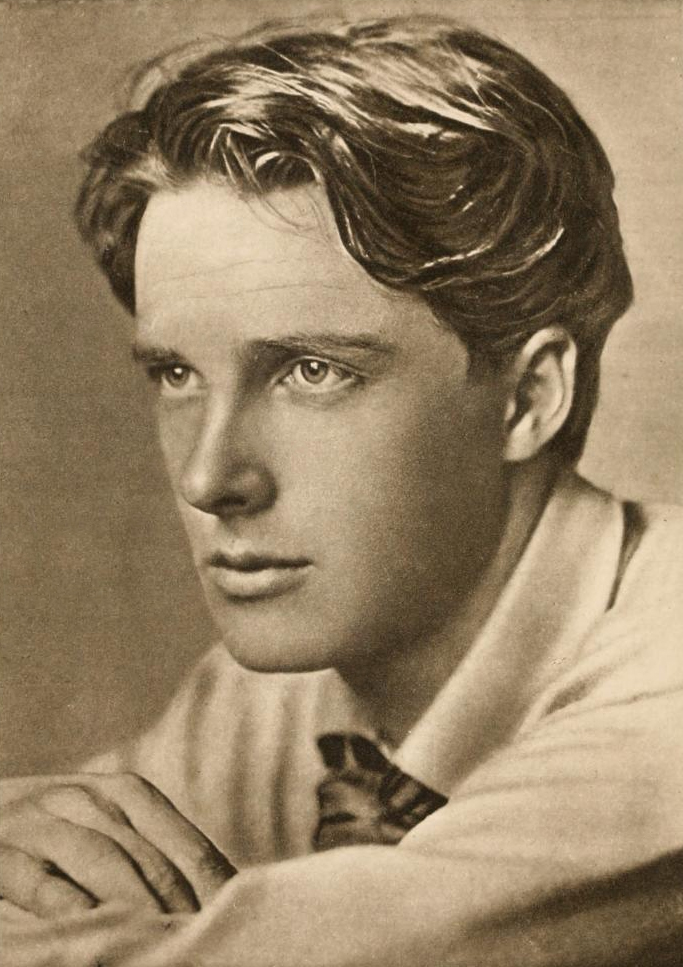
Sir Shane Leslie (first), the first cousin of Sir Winston Churchill, enclosed Fitzgerald's manuscript in a letter to Scribner's, hailing Fitzgerald as the next Rupert Brooke (second). "Though Scott Fitzgerald is still alive it has a literary value," Leslie wrote in the letter, "Of course when he is killed, it will also have a commercial value."

In March 1918, Fitzgerald gave the revised manuscript to his acquaintance, Anglo-Irish journalist Shane Leslie, to deliver to Charles Scribner's Sons in New York City. Fitzgerald had met Leslie when the journalist visited America and toured the Newman School in New Jersey. After proofreading The Romantic Egotist, Leslie asked Scribner's to retain the manuscript no matter what they thought of it. He proclaimed that Fitzgerald, upon his presumed death in the trenches, would become the next Rupert Brooke, a posthumously famous poet killed during World War I. "Though Scott Fitzgerald is still alive it has a literary value," Leslie wrote to Scribner's on May 6, 1918, "Of course when he is killed, it will also have a commercial value."

Upon reading Fitzgerald's draft of The Romantic Egotist, Scribner's editor Max Perkins urged his superiors to publish the manuscript, but senior editors Edward L. Burlingame and William C. Brownell disagreed with him regarding its quality and instructed him to reject the work. In an August 19, 1918 letter to Fitzgerald, Perkins turned down the manuscript but praised the writer's talent. Although he had been instructed to reject the work, Perkins provided detailed guidance on how to revise it, suggesting that Fitzgerald add more significance and details about Amory's "affairs with girls." Perkins encouraged Fitzgerald to resubmit the manuscript after making these revisions.

By June 1918, Fitzgerald served with the 45th and 67th Infantry Regiments at Camp Sheridan near Montgomery, Alabama. Attempting to rebound from Ginevra's rejection, a lonely Fitzgerald began courting young women, including Zelda Sayre, an idle Southern belle, who reminded him of Ginevra. At their first meeting, Fitzgerald told Zelda that she reminded him of Isabelle, the free-spirited character based on Ginevra in his unpublished manuscript. After sharing his ambitions, Zelda dismissed Fitzgerald's remarks as mere boastfulness and concluded that he would never become a famous writer. A romance blossomed, although Fitzgerald continued secretly writing to Ginevra, hoping in vain for a chance to resume their relationship. Three days after Ginevra's arranged marriage to a wealthy Chicago polo player, a heartbroken Fitzgerald professed his affection for Zelda in September 1918. In October 1918, Fitzgerald submitted a revised version of The Romantic Egoist to Scribner's, but the publisher rejected the work a second time, and he captioned their telegram in his scrapbook: "The end of a dream."

=== Despair and manuscript revisions ===
After his army discharge in February 1919, Fitzgerald moved to New York City amid the onset of the Jazz Age. While seeking a breakthrough as an author of fiction, he turned to writing advertising copy for Barron Collier to sustain himself but the vacuity of the work irritated him. "Advertising is a racket, like the movies and the brokerage business," Fitzgerald complained. "You cannot be honest without admitting that its constructive contribution to humanity is exactly minus zero." Although Fitzgerald had not intended to marry Zelda in December 1918, he changed his mind over the next three months, and the two became engaged by March 1919. As time passed, Fitzgerald continued living in poverty in New York City, and he could not convince Zelda that he could support her affluent lifestyle. She broke off their engagement in June.

Limbs that gleam and shadowy hair,
Or floating lazy, half-asleep.
Dive and double and follow after,
Snare in flowers, and kiss, and call,
With lips that fade, and human laughter
And faces individual,
Well this side of Paradise! . . .
There's little comfort in the wise.

— Rupert Brooke, Tiare Tahiti (1914)

In the wake of Ginevra rejecting Fitzgerald two years prior, Zelda's rejection further dispirited him. Unable to earn a successful living in New York City, Fitzgerald carried a revolver while contemplating suicide, and he threatened to jump to his death from a window ledge of the Yale Club. According to biographer Andrew Turnbull, "one day, drinking martinis in the upstairs lounge, [Fitzgerald] announced that he was going to jump out of the window. No one objected; on the contrary, it was pointed out that the windows were French and ideally suited for jumping, which seemed to cool his ardor." Despite Zelda's rejection, Fitzgerald hoped that his success as an author might change her mind, and he told a friend, "I wouldn't care if she died, but I couldn't stand to have anybody else marry her."

In July 1919, Fitzgerald quit his advertising job in New York and returned to St. Paul. Returning to his hometown as a failure, Fitzgerald became a recluse and lived on the top floor of his parents' home at 599 Summit Avenue. He decided to make one last attempt to become a novelist and to stake everything on the success or failure of a book. Abstaining from alcohol, he worked day and night to revise The Romantic Egotist as This Side of Paradise—an autobiographical account of his Princeton years and his romances with Ginevra King, Zelda Sayre, and other young women. Fitzgerald chose the new title based on a line in Rupert Brooke's poem Tiare Tahiti, "Well this side of Paradise!... There's little comfort in the wise."

While revising the manuscript, Fitzgerald drew upon the correspondence of friends and acquaintances. He quoted verbatim three letters and one poem by Father Sigourney Fay, a possibly gay Catholic priest with whom Fitzgerald had a close relationship. He also used a quote from Zelda's letters for a soliloquy by the narrator in the final pages. Zelda had written a letter eulogizing the Confederate soldiers who died during the American Civil War. "I've spent today in the graveyard," she wrote to Scott, "Isn't it funny how, out of a row of Confederate soldiers, two or three will make you think of dead lovers and dead loves—when they're exactly like the others, even to the yellowish moss." In the novel's final pages, Fitzgerald altered Zelda's neo-Confederate sentiments to refer to Union soldiers instead of Confederates.

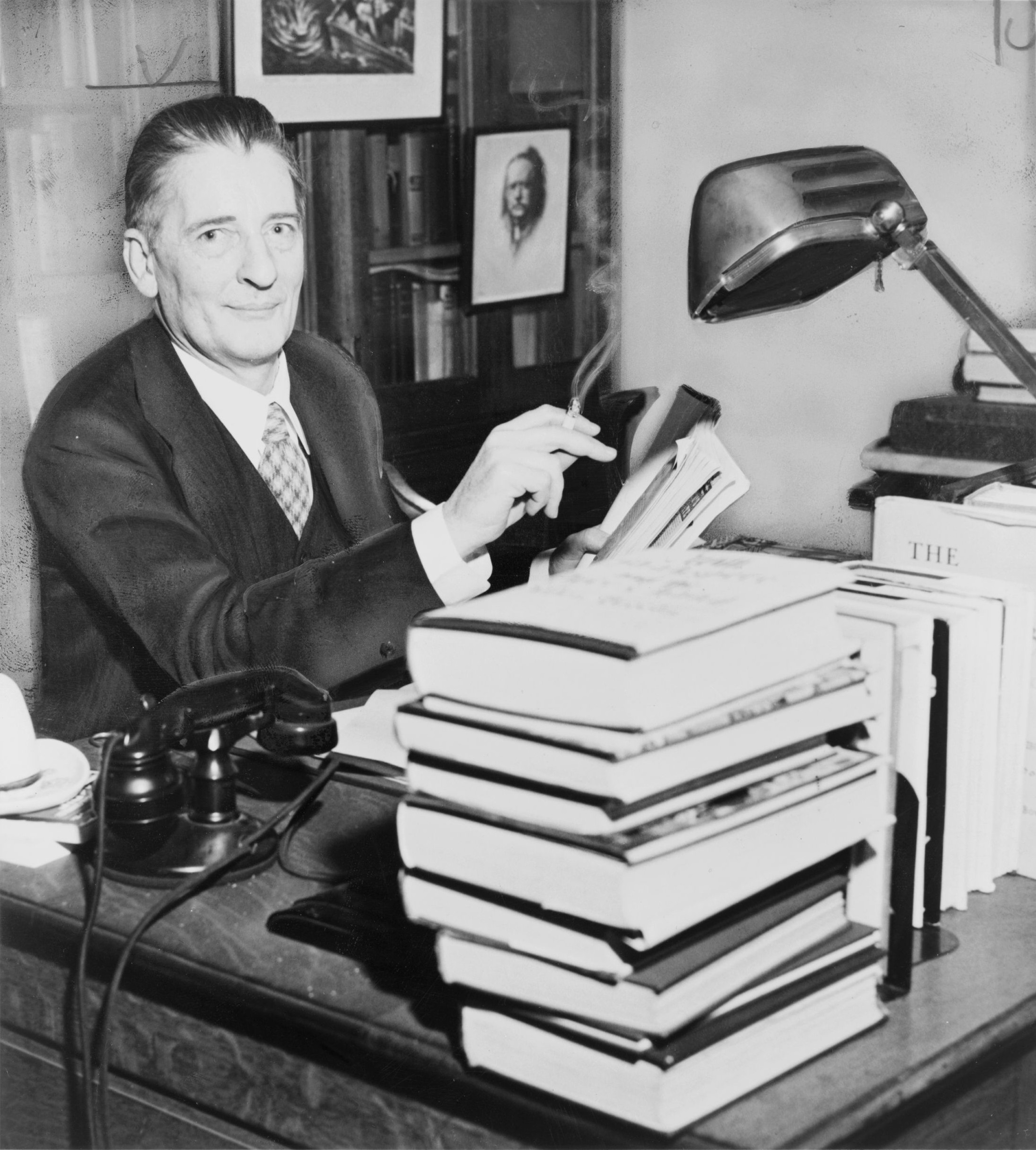
Max Perkins threatened to resign from Scribner's if the company did not publish Fitzgerald's novel. "If we're going to turn down the likes of Fitzgerald," Perkins stated, "I will lose all interest in publishing books."

Fitzgerald sent the revised manuscript to Scribner's on September 4, 1919. Although the manuscript again impressed Perkins who wished to publish the novel, senior executives at the publishing house again disagreed with Perkins and disliked the novel on the grounds of indecency. At the monthly meeting of Scribner's editorial board, an elderly Charles Scribner II, the company's president, grumbled that the work lacked "literary merit," and senior editor William C. Brownell dismissed it as "frivolous."

As the lone voice supporting the publication of Fitzgerald's novel at the editorial board meeting, a frustrated Perkins threatened to resign unless the company agreed to publish it. "My feeling is that a publisher's first allegiance is to talent. And if we aren't going to publish a talent like this, it is a very serious thing," Perkins declared at the meeting. "If we're going to turn down the likes of Fitzgerald, I will lose all interest in publishing books." Despite the fact that Fitzgerald's manuscript repelled older employees at Scribner's, the executives relented out of fear of losing Perkins as a gifted editor and literary talent scout.

On September 16, eight days before Fitzgerald's 23rd birthday, Scribner's accepted the novel for publication. Now able to express their opinions, lower-ranking editors at Scribner's opined that they believed Fitzgerald's novel represented the "voice of a new age". Soon after Scribner's decision, Perkins wrote a congratulatory letter to Fitzgerald that omitted his threat to resign if the company failed to publish the novel: "I am very glad, personally, to be able to write to you that we are all for publishing your book This Side of Paradise... I think that you have improved it enormously... The book is so different that it is hard to prophesy how it will sell but we are all for taking a chance and supporting it with vigor."

=== Publication and meteoric success ===
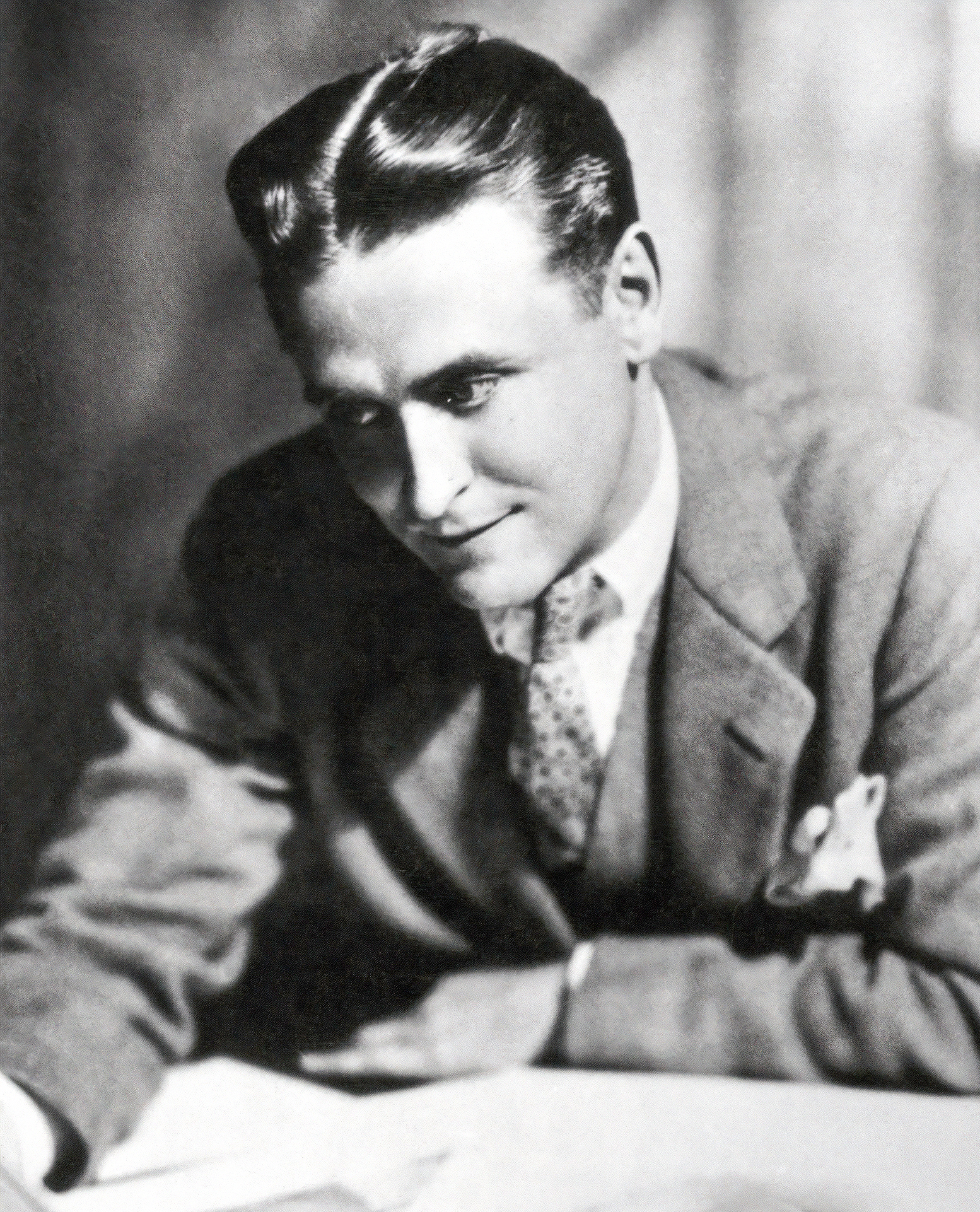
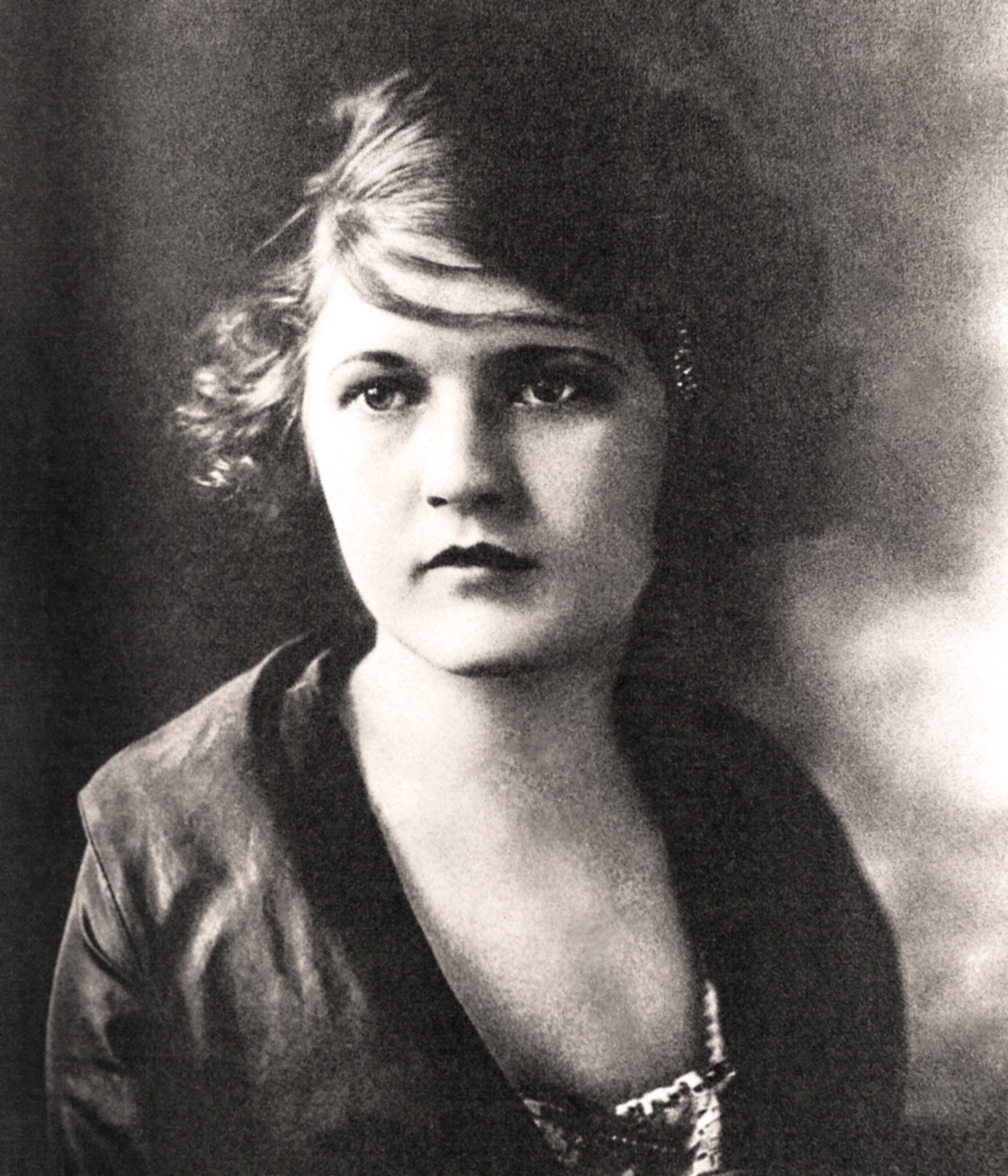
After F. Scott Fitzgerald informed Zelda Sayre of his novel's upcoming publication, she agreed to marry him. "I hate to say this," Zelda wrote contritely, "but I don't think I had much confidence in you at first... It's so nice to know you really can do things".

Upon receiving Perkins' letter and learning of his first novel's impending publication, Fitzgerald became euphoric. "The postman rang, and that day I quit work and ran along the streets, stopping automobiles to tell friends and acquaintances about it—my novel This Side of Paradise was accepted for publication," he recalled, "I paid off my terrible small debts, bought a suit, and woke up every morning with a world of ineffable top-loftiness and promise." After Scott informed Zelda of his novel's upcoming publication, a shocked Zelda replied contritely: "I hate to say this, but I don't think I had much confidence in you at first.... It's so nice to know you really can do things".

This Side of Paradise debuted on March 26, 1920, with a dust jacket illustrated by W. E. Hill. Advertised in newspapers with the slogan, "A Novel About Flappers Written For Philosophers," the initial printing of 3,000 copies sold out in three days. Although not among the ten best-selling novels of the year, the 23-year-old F. Scott Fitzgerald's first novel proved to be his most popular work and became a cultural sensation across the United States, making him a household name. The book went through twelve printings in 1920 and 1921, totaling 49,075 copies. Despite this success, the novel provided only modest income for Fitzgerald. Copies sold for $1.75 (equivalent to $28 in 2025), and he earned 10% on the first 5,000 copies and 15% thereafter, totaling $6,200 in 1920 (equivalent to $99,643 in 2025).

Although Fitzgerald complained to his friend Burton Rascoe that This Side of Paradise didn't make him wealthy, his new fame enabled him to earn much higher rates for his short stories, and Zelda resumed their engagement as he could now afford her privileged lifestyle. By the time of their wedding in April 1920, Fitzgerald claimed neither he nor Zelda still loved each other, and the early years of their marriage proved a disappointment. Despite his disappointing marriage, Fitzgerald had achieved the peak of his fame and cultural salience, and he recalled traveling in a taxi one afternoon through the streets of New York City and weeping when he realized that he would never be as happy again.

== Reception ==
=== Cultural sensation ===
This Side of Paradise was the flaming skyrocket of its season... [Fitzgerald's] photograph appeared in all of the exclusive journals as the picture of the hope of young America, the first person to turn the spotlight on the flapper in the back seat on a lonely road...

— Fanny Butcher, Chicago Tribune, 1925

This Side of Paradise focused the thought of the whole nation on the problems of 'flappers and parlor snakes' which it had known before simply as its daughters and sons. Some of the old-lady magazines are still debating these problems with tiresome gravity.

— Ralph Coghlan, St. Louis Post-Dispatch, 1925

Upon its publication, Fitzgerald's This Side of Paradise caused a cultural sensation that sparked societal debate, and, he became a national figure overnight. He riveted the public's attention on the promiscuous activities of their sons and daughters cavorting in the rumble seats of Bearcat roadsters and prompted a national conversation over the perceived immorality of this hedonistic younger generation. Despite the fact that Fitzgerald had composed the work several years earlier and his novel chronicled the more restrained social milieu of pre-war 1910s America, the work became popularly and inaccurately associated with the wild carefree atmosphere of post-war 1920s America immortalized in John Held, Jr.'s satirical drawings.

With this debut novel, critics touted Fitzgerald as the first writer to turn the national spotlight on the Jazz Age generation, especially their young flappers. In contrast to the older Lost Generation to which Gertrude Stein posited that Ernest Hemingway and Fitzgerald belonged, the Jazz Age generation were those Americans younger than Fitzgerald who had been adolescents during World War I and largely untouched by the conflict. Fitzgerald described this younger generation as the true "lost" generation which shouldered his generational contemporaries out of the way: "This was the generation whose girls dramatized themselves as flappers".

Due to its focus on liberated flappers and college life, Fitzgerald's novel became a cultural phenomenon among young Americans. According to writer John O'Hara, half a million young men and women "fell in love with the book," and, according to essayist Glenway Wescott, Fitgerald's novel became the rallying banner of the "youth movement". The novel's immense popularity among American youth stemmed from its frank portrayal of their chafing under the outdated social mores of Wilsonian America. Although earlier works about collegiate life had been published such as Owen Johnson's Stover at Yale (1912), Fitzgerald's work became heralded as "the first realistic American college novel", and young American men viewed the novel as a guide for social conduct. Newspapers reported that young American women imitated the rebellious behavior of the novel's women characters, and some writers miscredited Fitzgerald's novel with creating the cultural archetype of the flapper.

=== Youth in revolt ===
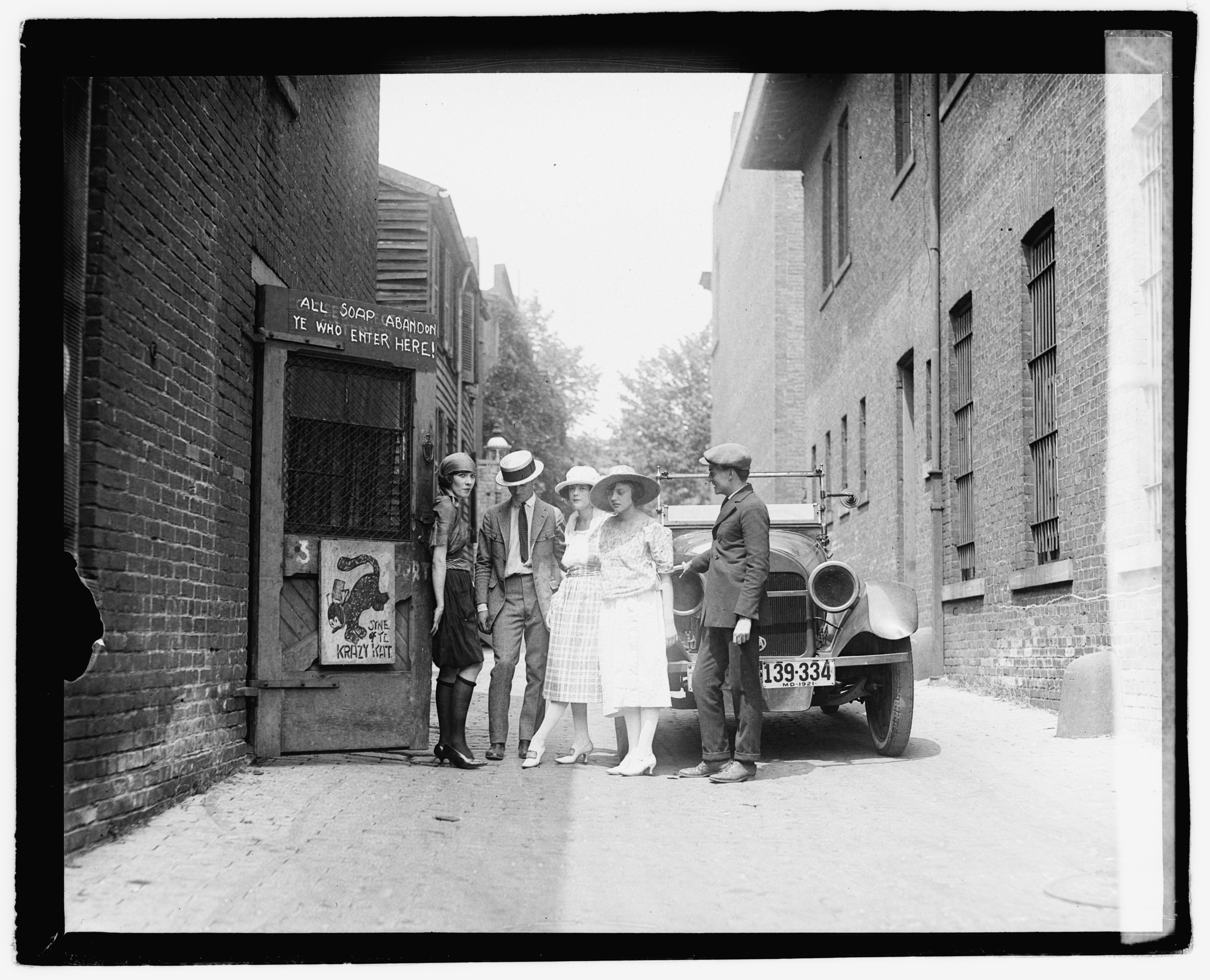
A flapper and patrons in front of The Krazy Kat, a Jazz Age speakeasy, in 1921. Critics touted Fitzgerald's This Side of Paradise as turning the national spotlight on the Jazz Age generation—those Americans younger than Fitzgerald who had been adolescents during World War I and whom Fitzgerald regarded as the true "lost" generation.

With his photograph appearing in many newspapers, the national press depicted Fitzgerald as the standard-bearer for "youth in revolt". "'Behold a new prophet is risen, who speaketh for Youth in Revolt!" wrote The Montgomery Advertiser, describing the reaction to Fitzgerald's novel. "All things formerly held to be beautiful, good and true are now become futile, fatuous and fabulous, and worthy of respect no more. The bob-haired girl and the mop topped boy shall teach you the Facts of Life. Go to, ye elders, hearken unto them!'" Such articles fostered the widespread impression of Fitzgerald as championing the revolt by young Americans against traditional norms and as the outstanding aggressor in the rebellion of "flaming youth" against the "old guard".

Capitalizing on his new standing as a national figure with his finger on the pulse of young America, Fitzgerald gave interviews discoursing on the revolt by youth culture. Declaring that World War I "had little or nothing to do" with the change in morals among young Americans and did not leave "any real lasting effect," Fitzgerald attributed the sexual revolution among young adults to a combination of popular literature by H. G. Wells and other intellectuals criticizing repressive social norms, Sigmund Freud's sexual theories gaining salience, and the invention of the automobile allowing youths to escape parental surveillance in order to engage in premarital sex.

As a result of Fitzgerald's new fame as a celebrated author chronicling young Americans' defiance towards traditional values, social conservatives attacked the author in newspaper columns. Heywood Broun decried Fitzgerald's use of modern slang and attempted to discredit him by claiming the author fabricated his novel's depiction of young people engaging in drunken sprees and premarital sex. An amused Fitzgerald ridiculed such allegations, and he opined that such critics wished to discredit his work in order to retain their outdated conceptions of American society.

=== Critical reaction ===
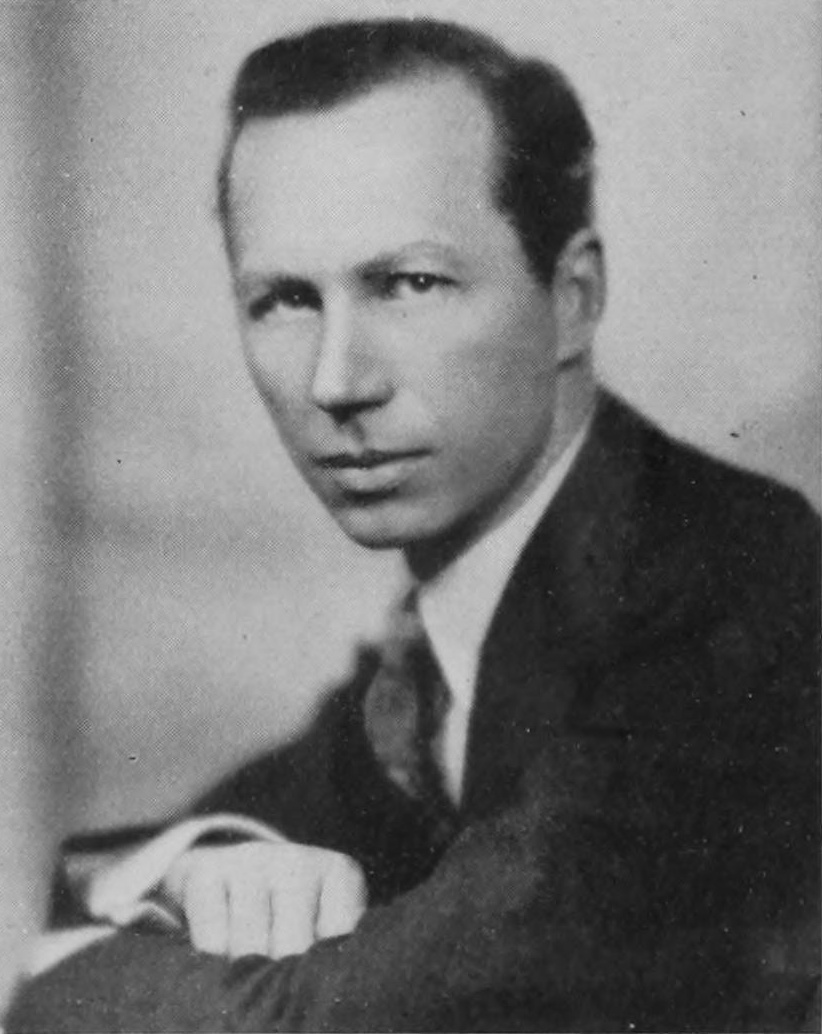
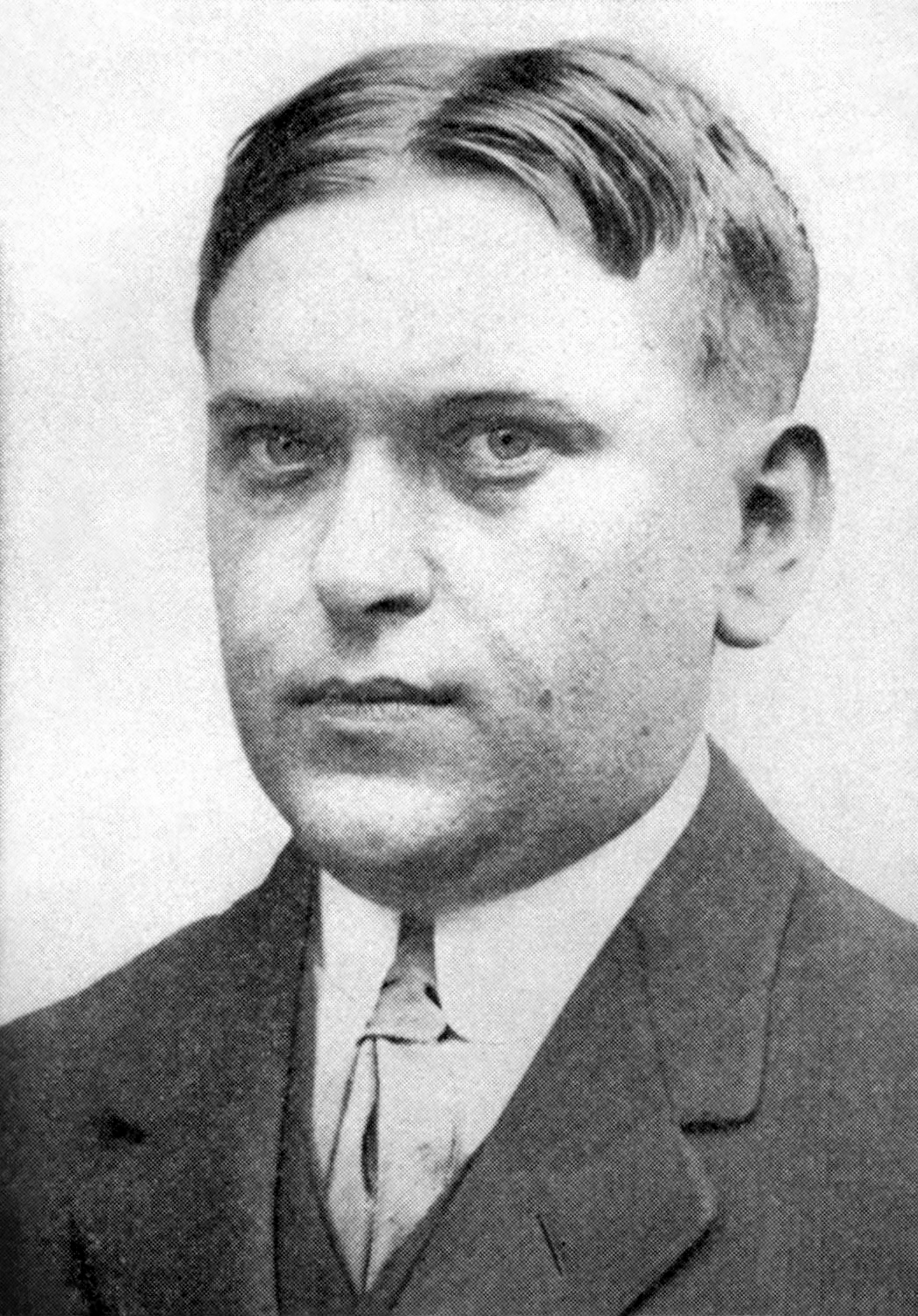
Literary critics such as Burton Rascoe and H. L. Mencken hailed Fitzgerald's This Side of Paradise as an outstanding debut novel.

The majority of critics lauded Fitzgerald's debut novel with "wild enthusiasm", and the most enthusiastic reviewers went so far as to hail the young Midwestern writer as a literary genius. In his April 1920 review, critic Burton Rascoe of The Chicago Tribune urged his readers to "make a note of the name, F. Scott Fitzgerald. It is borne by a 23 year old novelist who will, unless I am much mistaken, be much heard of hereafter." Rascoe asserted that Fitzgerald's first novel bore "the impress, it seems to me, of genius. It is the only adequate study that we have had of the contemporary American in adolescence and young manhood."

"The prize first novel of a decade is F. Scott Fitzgerald's This Side of Paradise," critic Fanny Butcher raved in her June 1920 column for The Chicago Tribune, singling out Fitzgerald for particular praise amid other competitors that included the U.S. publication of Virginia Woolf's first novel The Voyage Out and Zane Grey's novel A Man for the Ages. Butcher declared Fitzgerald's book to be "the living, palpitant being of the youth of the hour, a book which, I haven't a doubt in the world, will have a serious and far reaching effect on American literature."

Perhaps the most influential review of Fitzgerald's novel came from critic H. L. Mencken, the editor of the literary magazine The Smart Set. Mencken's authoritative opinions on the latest literary endeavors often lifted their authors upward toward greater success or cast them down into cultural oblivion. In his August 1920 review of This Side of Paradise, Mencken described Fitzgerald's work as an amazing debut and lavished praise on its author:

The best American novel that I have seen of late is also the product of a neophyte, to wit, F. Scott Fitzgerald... He offers a truly amazing first novel—original in structure, extremely sophisticated in manner, and adorned with a brilliancy that is as rare in American writing... The young American novelist usually reveals himself as a naive, sentimental and somewhat disgusting ignoramus—a believer in Great Causes, a snuffler and eye-roller, a spouter of stale philosophies out of Kensington drawing rooms, the doggeries of French hack-drivers, and the lower floor of the Munich Hofbräuhaus... Fitzgerald is nothing of the sort. On the contrary, he is... an artist—an apt and delicate weaver of words...

Mencken declared the first half of This Side of Paradise to be superior to the second half, perceiving that Fitzgerald's novel became more "thin" as the young author followed less autobiographical plot strands. Fitzgerald concurred with Mencken's low opinion of certain later chapters, particularly Amory's relations with Eleanor. In his annotated copy of This Side of Paradise, Fitzgerald deemed his Eleanor subplot to be unintentionally hilarious and admitted he could not "even bear to read it." Believing that Fitzgerald's protagonist began to elude the author in the second half, Mencken criticized Fitzgerald for dropping "his Amory Blaine as Mark Twain dropped Huckleberry Finn, but for a less cogent reason." Despite this critique, he commended most of the novel, particularly up to and including the section detailing the love story with Rosalind.

Whereas some critics praised the novel's form and structure as highly original, others criticized the work for the same reasons. Lillian C. Ford in The Los Angeles Times complained "the construction is odd and the book has two parts, the first with four chapters and the second with five. The chapters have unexpected topical divisions and when the author feels so inclined he throws his story into drama form and then again it jogs along as plain narrative." Similarly, many reviewers commented that Fitzgerald's structural craftsmanship left much to be desired. He could write entertainingly, they conceded, but he paid scant attention to form and construction. Having read these criticisms of his debut novel, Fitzgerald sought to improve on his form and construction in his next work, The Beautiful and Damned, and to venture into a new genre of fiction altogether.

=== Princeton backlash ===
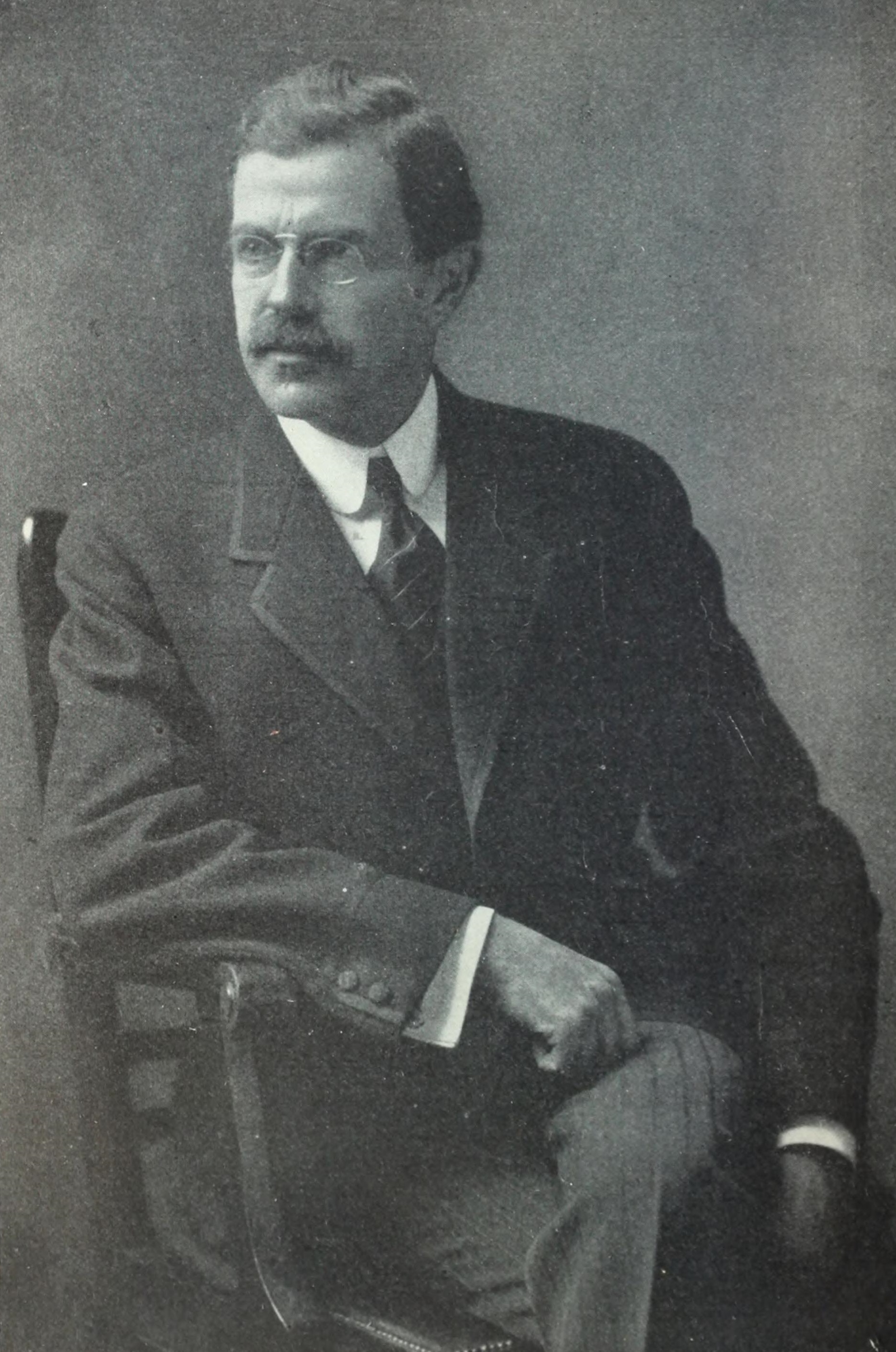
John Grier Hibben, the president of Princeton University, criticized the novel in a letter to Fitzgerald. "Very frankly," Hibben wrote, "your characterization of Princeton has grieved me."

Despite the novel's warm reception by critics and readers, many of Princeton University's faculty and alumni reacted with hostility towards Fitzgerald's This Side of Paradise, much to Fitzgerald's surprise and dismay. Although Fitzgerald's mentor Christian Gauss, a Professor of French Literature, lauded the novel as "a work of art," other Princetonians attacked the book in the pages of the Princeton Alumni Weekly and The Daily Princetonian. They despised his popular novel for fostering an unfavorable impression of their school as a snobbish milieu focused on idle pleasures. In a typical review, Ralph Kent, a senior editor of the Nassau Literary Review, disparaged the work as impugning Princeton's reputation due to its superficial depiction of undergraduate life.

Fitzgerald's novel soon attracted the attention and displeasure of John Grier Hibben, a Presbyterian minister and educational reformer who succeeded Woodrow Wilson as the president of Princeton University. In a private letter to Fitzgerald dated May 27, 1920, Hibben expressed his profound disappointment with Fitzgerald's depiction of the school and informed the young author that his novel had wounded him:

It is because I appreciate so much all that is in you of artistic skill and [a] certain elemental power that I am taking the liberty of telling you very frankly that your characterization of Princeton has grieved me. I cannot bear to think that our young men are merely living for four years in a country club and spending their lives wholly in a spirit of calculation and snobbishness... I have always had a belief in Princeton and in what the place could do in the making of a strong vigorous manhood. It would be an overwhelming grief to me, in the midst of my work here and my love for Princeton's young men, should I feel that we have nothing to offer but the outgrown symbols and shells of a past whose reality has long since disappeared.

These weeks in the clouds ended abruptly a week later when Princeton turned on the book—not undergraduate Princeton but the black mass of faculty and alumni. There was a kind but reproachful letter from President Hibben, and a room full of classmates who suddenly turned on me with condemnation... The Alumni Weekly got after my book and only Dean Gauss had a good word to say or me. The unctuousness and hypocrisy of the proceedings was exasperating and for seven years I didn't go to Princeton.

— F. Scott Fitzgerald, "Early Success," October 1937

In response to Hibben's chastising letter, Fitzgerald wrote a respectful but uncompromising reply that denied any attempt to disparage Princeton and defended his novel's depiction of the university. "I have no fault to find with Princeton that I can't find with Oxford and Cambridge," Fitzgerald explained. "I simply wrote out of my own impressions, wrote as honestly as I could a picture of its beauty. That the picture is cynical is the fault of my temperament.... I must admit however that This Side of Paradise does over accentuate the gaiety and country club atmosphere of Princeton. For the sake of the readers interest that part was much over-stressed, and of course the hero, not being average, reacted rather unhealthily I suppose to many perfectly normal phenomena. To that extent the book is inaccurate."

As a result of this unexpected backlash by the faculty and alumni, Fitzgerald's joy at becoming a famous novelist proved short-lived. Although undergraduates across the country touted the novel as a realistic portrayal of college life, Princeton alumni and former classmates continued to treat the author with contempt in social settings over the ensuing months. In one instance, Fitzgerald visited Princeton's University Cottage Club and faced a room full of alumni and former classmates who condemned him for tarnishing their school's reputation. After informing Fitzgerald that he had been suspended from the club, they symbolically ejected him from the building via a rear window. Exasperated by the contemptuousness and sanctimoniousness of Princeton's faculty and alumni, a dispirited Fitzgerald did not return to visit his alma mater for many years, presumably until their hostility had lessened.

When, shortly after his death, Zelda Fitzgerald attempted to sell her husband's papers to Princeton for $3,750, the librarian declined the offer. The university had no obligation, he commented, to support the widow of a second-rate Midwestern hack who'd been lucky enough to attend Princeton.

— Scott Donaldson, F. Scott Fitzgerald: Fool for Love (1983)

After a 44-year-old Fitzgerald died of a heart attack due to occlusive coronary arteriosclerosis in December 1940, many Princeton staff and alumni continued to privately and publicly belittle the author and his literary oeuvre. According to biographer Scott Donaldson, after Fitzgerald's death, his widow Zelda Fitzgerald attempted to sell the entirety of her late husband's papers to Princeton University for the modest sum of $3,750 (equivalent to $86,179 in 2025), but the Princeton librarian spurned the offer. The Princeton librarian explained that the university felt no obligation to pay such a sum for the papers of a mediocre author who had been fortunate enough to attend their prestigious institution.

One year later, in 1941, literary critic Edmund Wilson, a close friend of Fitzgerald and a fellow Princetonian, attempted to use his considerable influence to persuade the university to publish a book honoring F. Scott Fitzgerald but proved unsuccessful. In 1956, when the Princeton University Library released a collection of Fitzgerald's writings titled Afternoon of an Author, many alumni wrote letters of complaint arguing that Princeton should neither celebrate its connection to the author nor describe him as "most Princetonian."

== Critical analysis ==
=== Contemporary analysis ===
==== Innovative style ====
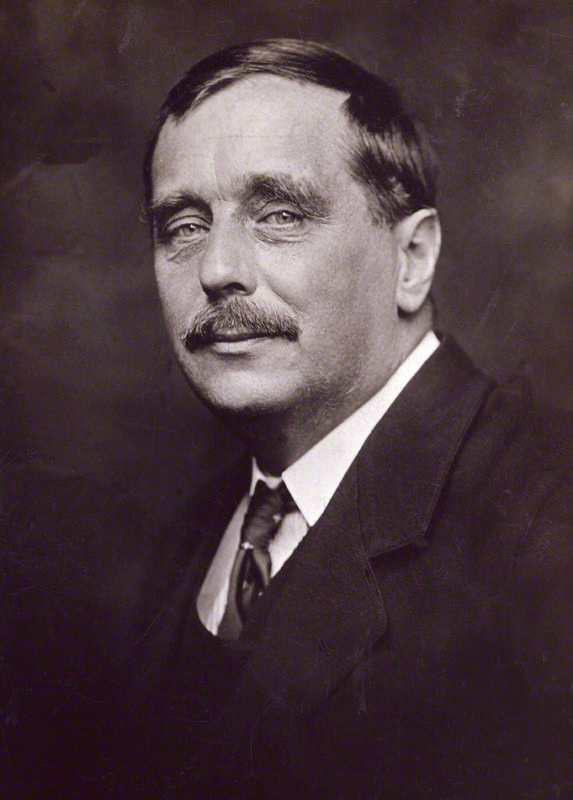
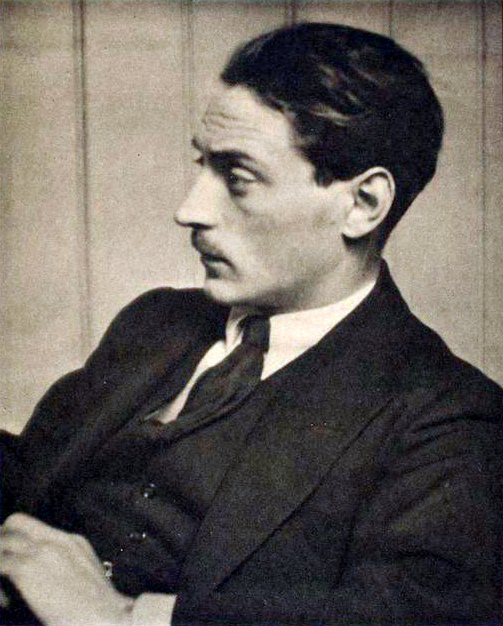
Fitzgerald used Tono-Bungay (1909) by H. G. Wells (first) and Sinister Street (1913) by Sir Compton Mackenzie (second) as templates for his novel.

For his first novel, Fitzgerald used as his literary templates H. G. Wells' 1909 realist work Tono-Bungay and Sir Compton Mackenzie's 1913 novel Sinister Street, which chronicles a college student's coming of age at Oxford University. The influence of these two particular novels upon This Side of Paradise proved apparent to perceptive readers such as Fitzgerald's friend Edmund Wilson who, upon finishing the novel, described Fitzgerald's work as "an exquisite burlesque of Compton Mackenzie with a pastiche of Wells thrown in at the end."

Although Fitzgerald imitated these novels, his debut work differed due to its experimental style. He discarded the traditional narrative of most novels and instead unspooled the plot in the form of intermingled textual fragments, letters, and poetry, even incorporating a stream-of-consciousness passage. This approach resulted from combining The Romantic Egotist, his earlier novel attempt, with various short stories and poems he had written but never published.

This atonal blend of different fictive elements prompted critics to fête Fitzgerald as a trailblazer whose work modernized a staid literature that had fallen "as far behind modern habits as behind modern history." "This Side of Paradise may not seem like much now," writer Dorothy Parker attested decades later, "but in 1920 it was considered an experimental novel; it cut new ground."

==== Prose anomalies ====
More so than most contemporary writers of his era, Fitzgerald's authorial voice evolved and matured over time, and each of his novels represented a discernible progression in literary quality. Although critics eventually regarded him as possessing "the best narrative gift of the century," they did not perceive this narrative gift as evident in This Side of Paradise. Believing that prose had a basis in lyric verse, Fitzgerald crafted his sentences by ear and, consequently, This Side of Paradise contains numerous malapropisms and descriptive non sequiturs which annoyed readers and reviewers. Reflecting on these copious defects, critic Edmund Wilson remarked that Fitzgerald's first novel exhibited nearly every possible fault and weakness a novel can possess.

=== Posthumous analysis ===
I don't want to repeat my innocence. I want the pleasure of losing it again.

— F. Scott Fitzgerald, This Side of Paradise (1920)

In more recent years, the underlying themes of narcissism and feminism in the novel have been examined in a variety of scholarly essays. Scholar Saori Tanaka's argues that "Amory comes to know himself through Beatrice and his four lovers, which are like five sheets of glass. They are his reflectors... reflecting his narcissism and the inner side."

The first three women in the book allow Amory to dream in a narcissistic way. After participating in the war and losing his financial foundation, the last two women he meets, Rosalind and Eleanor, "make him not dream but awake" in postwar America. "With Beatrice and Isabelle, Amory activates the grandiose self," Tanaka states, "with Clara and Rosalind, he restricts narcissism, and with Eleanor, he gains a realistic conception of the self."

Others have analyzed feminist themes in the work. Scholar Andrew Riccardo views several characters to be feminist templates. Eleanor's character serves as a "love interest, therapeutic friend, and conversational other". Highly educated in discussing poetry and philosophy, "Eleanor not only posits her desires in juxtaposition to the lingering expectations of women in her day but also serves as soothsayer to the demands which would be placed on females".

== Legacy and influence ==
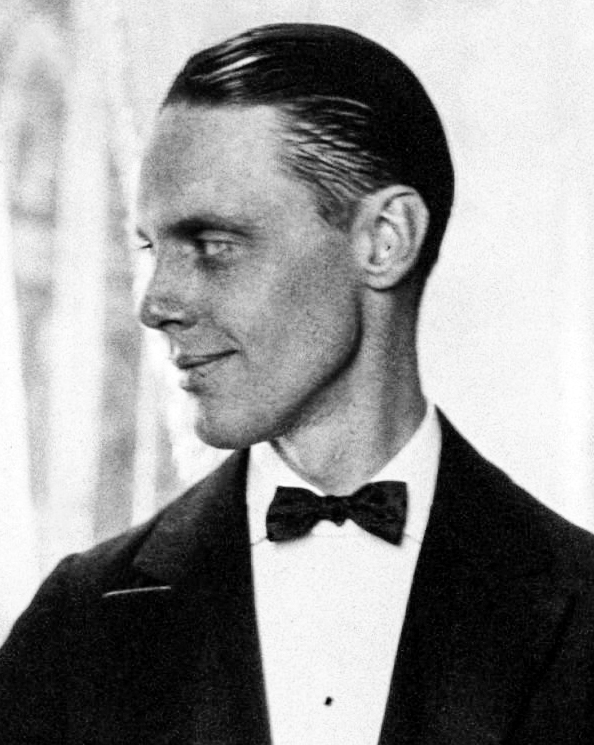
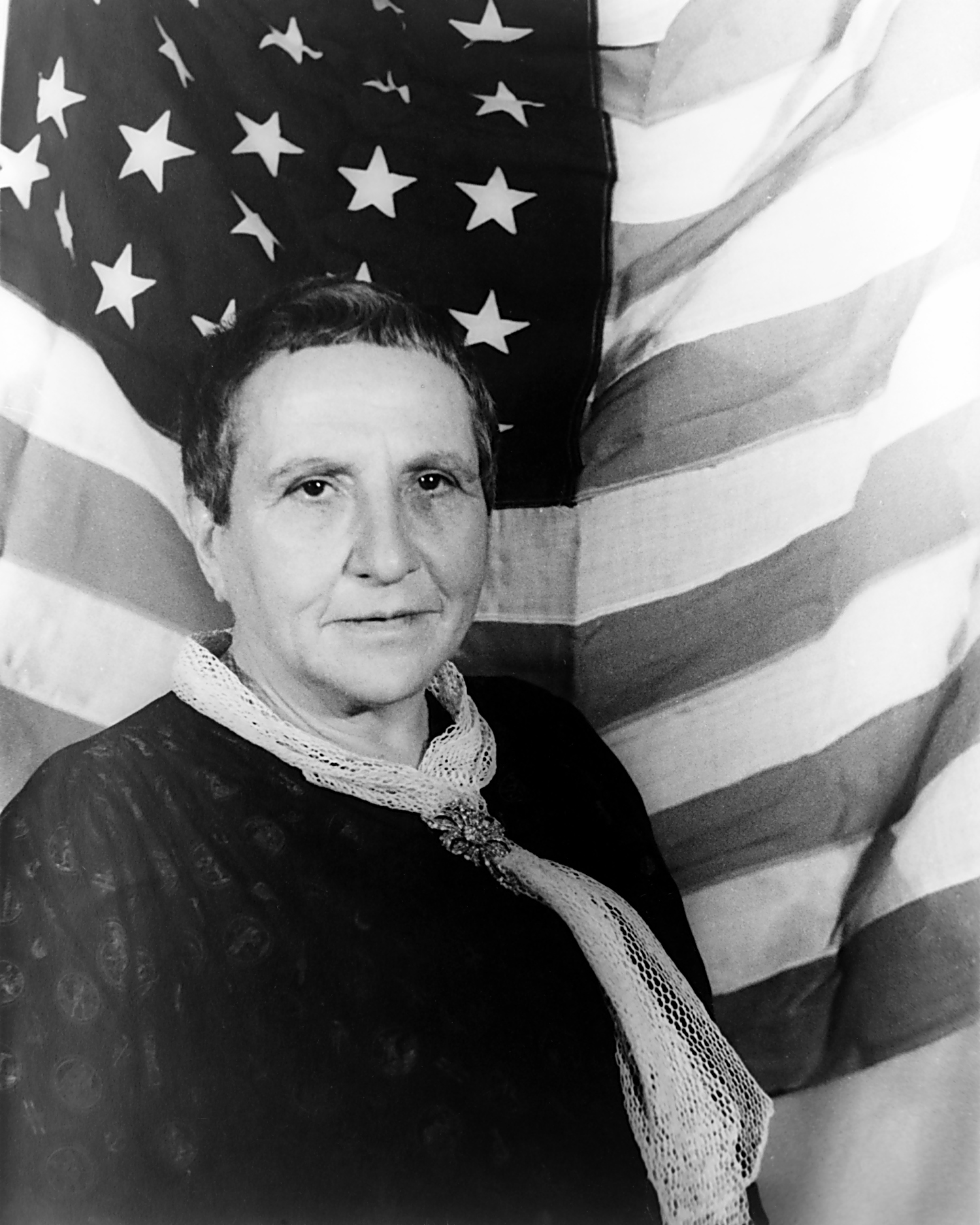
John V. A. Weaver (first) claimed the literary influence of Fitzgerald's This Side of Paradise on young writers to be inestimable, while Gertrude Stein (second) wrote that his novel created a new generation of young writers in the public's mind.

[Fitzgerald] has been to post-war American letters what Victor Hugo was to his time; and This Side of Paradise... was the manifesto of the 'younger generation'... It made this wild, keen, enthusiastic younger generation self-conscious; it encouraged innumerable beginners to open revolt against the platitudes and pollyannalysis [sic] of precedent. In a literary way, Fitzgerald’s influence is so great that it cannot be estimated.

— John V. A. Weaver, 1922

As an experimental novel, This Side of Paradise influenced the next generation of upcoming American writers, and critics such as John V. A. Weaver likened Fitzgerald's impact on post-war American literature to Victor Hugo's vast influence on French letters. Within two years, in the wake of young imitators writing in more experimental styles and discarding the traditional story structure, Weaver declared Fitzgerald's influence on younger writers to be so great as to be inestimable. In her memoir The Autobiography of Alice B. Toklas, Gertrude Stein wrote that Fitzgerald's novel created this new generation of young writers in the public's mind.

In addition to its literary influence on young writers, social commentators credited Fitzgerald's novel with having a profound cultural impact, purportedly inspiring the younger generation of Americans to rebel against the social norms and cultural standards of their elders. Remarking upon the popular association between Fitzgerald and the flaming youth of the Jazz Age, critic Burke Van Allen wrote in 1934 that "no generation of Americans has had a chronicler so persuasive and unmaudlin" as Fitzgerald, and no author became so closely identified with the generation he recorded.

The popular identification of Fitzgerald as the chronicler of carefree youth and proselytizer of Jazz Age hedonism earned him the enmity of reactionary societal figures. When he died in 1940, social conservatives rejoiced over his death. Writing in The New York World-Telegram, columnist Westbrook Pegler wrote that Fitzgerald's death a few weeks prior reawakened "memories of a queer bunch of undisciplined and self-indulgent brats who were determined not to pull their weight in the boat and wanted the world to drop everything and sit down and bawl with them. A kick in the pants and a clout over the scalp were more like their needing." Due to this widespread perception of Fitzgerald and his literary works, the Baltimore Diocese denied him a Catholic burial and refused his family permission to intern him at St. Mary's Church in Rockville, Maryland.

Observing the joyful vitriol expressed by social conservatives after Fitzgerald's death, essayist Glenway Wescott opined that such persons could never erase the impact of Fitzgerald's This Side of Paradise on 1920s America and young Americans. "Self-congratulatory moral persons may crow over him if they wish," Wescott wrote in a February 1941 essay two months after Fitzgerald's death, but "This Side of Paradise haunted the decade like a song, popular but perfect. It hung over an entire youth movement like a banner, somewhat discolored and windworn now; the wind has lapsed out of it. But a book which college boys really read is a rare thing, not to be dismissed idly or in a moment of severe sophistication."

The title was alluded to in the first major biography of Fitzgerald, The Far Side of Paradise, by Arthur Mizener, first published in 1951.
