= Thomas Parke D'Invilliers =

Pen name of F. Scott Fitzgerald

Thomas Parke D'Invilliers is both a pen name of F. Scott Fitzgerald and a character in his quasi-autobiographical first novel, This Side of Paradise. In the novel, which is more or less a roman à clef, D'Invilliers represents the poet John Peale Bishop, a friend of Fitzgerald's at Princeton and a member of the 1917 class.

The epigraph on title page of Fitzgerald's The Great Gatsby features a poem ostensibly signed by D'Invilliers, called from the first hemistich Then Wear the Gold Hat.

Then wear the gold hat, if that will move her;
If you can bounce high, bounce for her too,
Till she cry “Lover, gold-hatted, high-bouncing lover,
I must have you!”
