= John Peale Bishop =

American poet

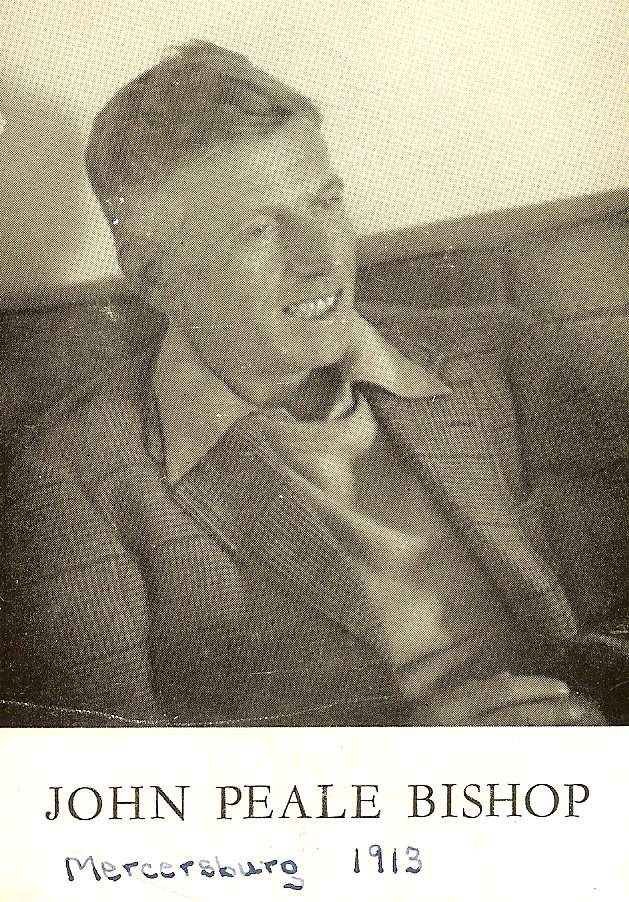
John Peale Bishop

John Peale Bishop (May 21, 1892 – April 4, 1944) was an American poet and man of letters.

== Biography ==
Bishop was born in Charles Town, West Virginia, to a family from New England, and attended school in Hagerstown, Maryland and Mercersburg Academy. At 18, Bishop fell victim to a severe illness and temporarily lost his sight. He entered Princeton University in 1913, at age 21, where he became friends with Edmund Wilson and F. Scott Fitzgerald and was the editor of the Nassau Literary Magazine. He graduated from Princeton in 1917 and served with the army for two years in Europe. He was the model for the character Thomas Parke D'Invilliers in Fitzgerald's first novel, This Side of Paradise.

Upon returning to the United States, he wrote poetry as well as essays and reviews for Vanity Fair in New York City. In 1922 he married Margaret Hutchins, and they soon moved to France, where they lived until 1933, interrupted by a stint for Paramount Pictures in New York (1925–26). While in France they bought the Château de Tressancourt at Orgeval, Seine et Oise, near Paris, where they raised three sons.

In 1931 Mr. Bishop won the $5,000 prize in Scribner's Magazine's long short story contest with "Many Thousands Gone," one of his best known works.

In 1933 Bishop's family returned to the United States, residing first in Connecticut, then New Orleans, and finally in a house on Cape Cod. His novel Act of Darkness, based on the true story of the rape of a prominent Charles Town social figure by a local Charles Town man, caused a scandal in the town when it was published.

He became chief poetry reviewer for The Nation (1940). In 1941-2 he served as publications director in the Office of the Coordinator of Inter-American Affairs, and was then invited to be resident fellow at the Library of Congress. He died within a few months of his appointment, on April 4, 1944, in Hyannis, Massachusetts.

== Selected works ==
- Green Fruit, poetry, 1917
- The Undertaker’s Garland, with Edmund Wilson, decorations by Boris Artzybasheff, poetry, 1922
- Many Thousands Gone, short stories, 1931
- Now With His Love, poetry, 1933
- Act of Darkness, novel, 1935
- Minute Particulars, poetry, 1935
- Selected Poems, 1941
- The Collected Essays of John Peale Bishop, posthumous, 1948
- The Republic of Letters in America, posthumous collection of letters with Allen Tate, 1981

== Awards ==
- Golden Tiger Award, Princeton University, 1918
