= Cleveland Tower =

Bell tower and carillon at Princeton University

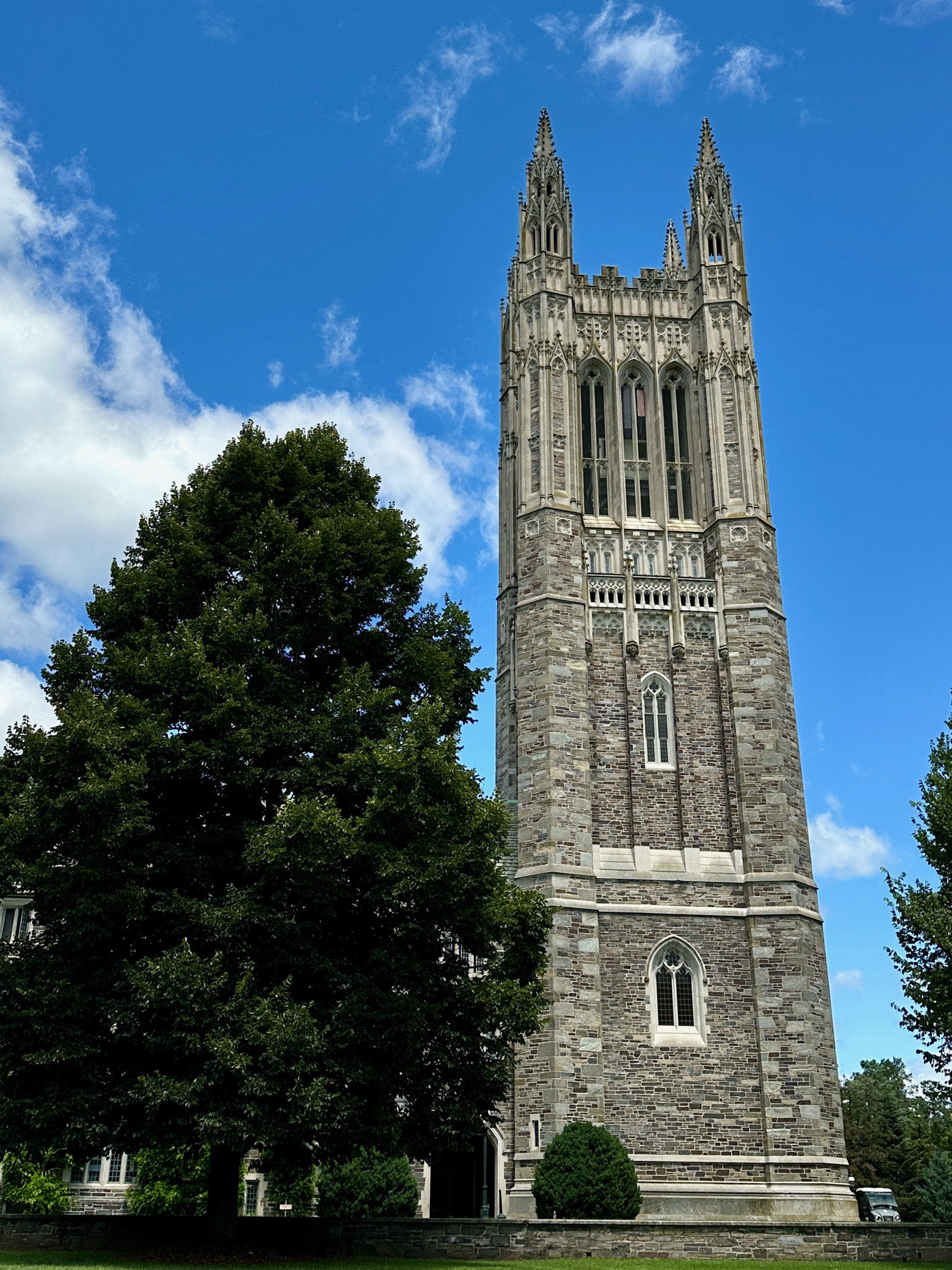
- Interactive map of the Cleveland Tower area

Cleveland Tower is a bell tower containing a carillon on the campus of Princeton University. It was designed by Ralph Adams Cram and is one of the defining Collegiate Gothic architectural features of the university's Graduate College. The tower was built in 1913 as a memorial to former university trustee and U.S. President Grover Cleveland. A bust of the former president is the centerpiece of the grand chamber at the tower's ground level.

== Class of 1892 Bells ==
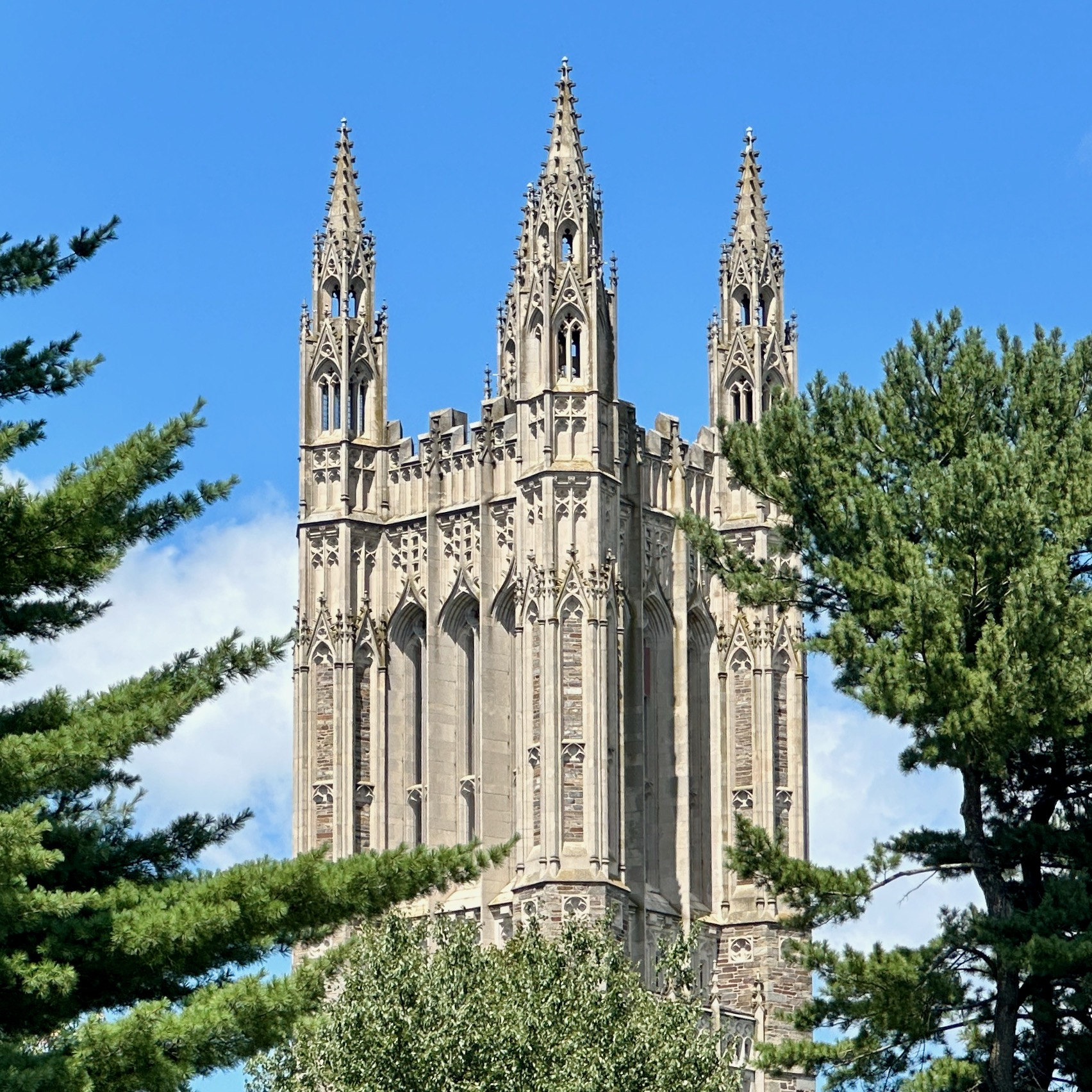
Carillon location

The tower's carillon is a gift of the class of 1892, which presented the bells as their 35th reunion dedication to the university in 1927. The English foundry Gillett & Johnston cast the original 35 bells. A plaque near the tower's entrance reads:

The Class of Eighteen Ninety Two presents the carillon in this tower to Princeton University with love and gratitude and the hope that its bells may ever inspire coming generations of Princeton men to maintain the traditions of their alma mater in the service of God and of their country

Originally dedicated on June 17, 1927, the bells were rededicated after decades of varying use and maintenance on June 13, 1993. The Class of 1892 Bells are now one of the largest carillons in the world with 67 bells and a bourdon (G) weighing 12,880 pounds (5,840 kg). The Chapel Music Program maintains the carillon program with assistance from an endowment by the class of 1892. The bells play Sunday afternoons by university carillonneur Lisa Lonie, and weekday evenings by students, except during exam periods. The summer programs include performances by international guests. A carillon practice room is also housed in the Graduate College basement.

Lisa J. Lonie, University Carillonneur, is the only fourth carillonneur in the instrument's +80 year history and the first female to hold the position.

== See also ==
- American Collegiate Gothic towers:
  - Gasson Hall, Boston College
  - Harkness Tower, Yale University
  - Duke Chapel, Duke University
  - Trinity College Chapel, Hartford
- List of carillons in the United States
