= Third Addition to Rockville and Old St. Mary's Church and Cemetery =

Historic district in Maryland, United States

- U.S. National Register of Historic Places
- U.S. Historic district
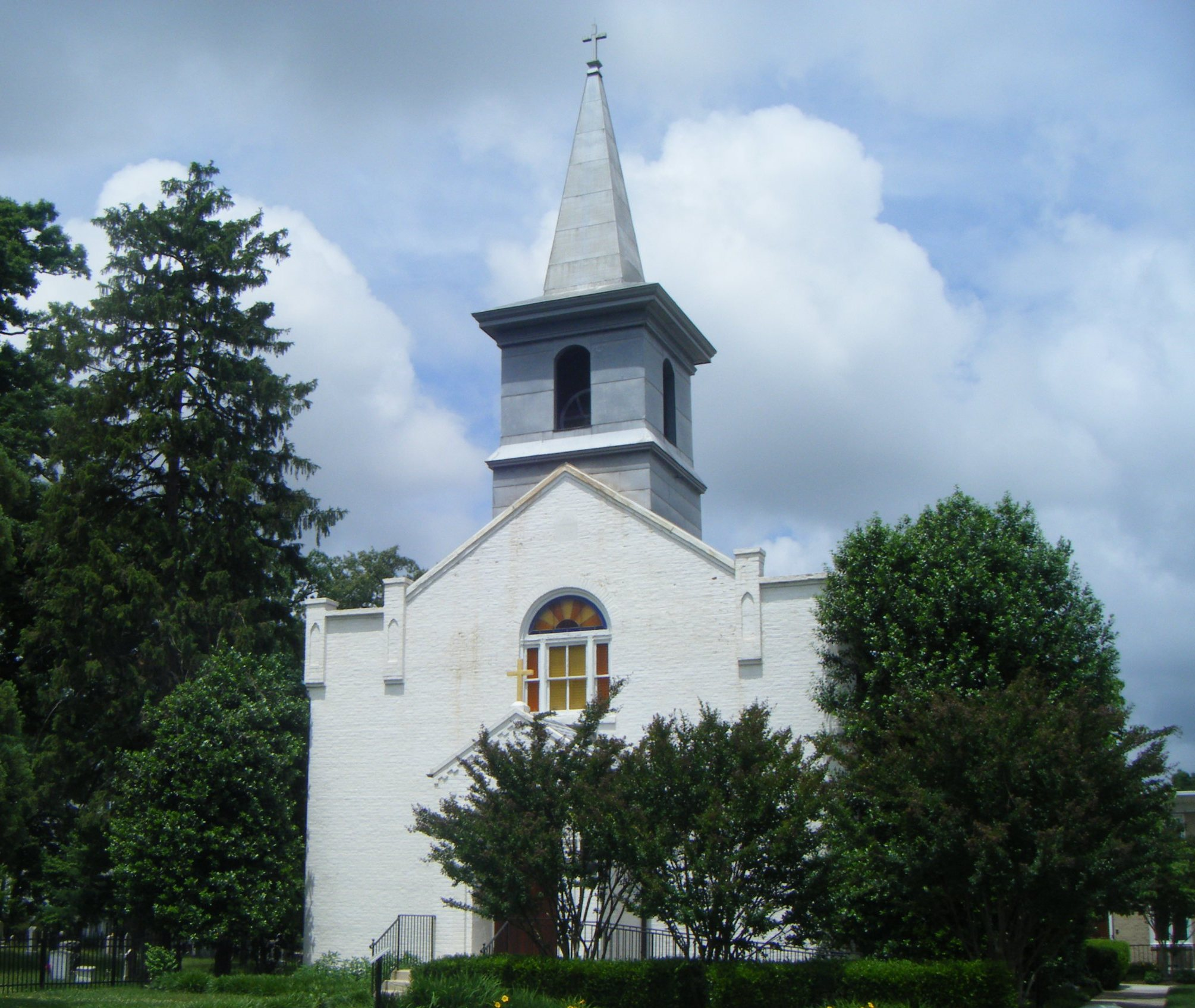
- St. Mary's Church

- Location within Maryland Location within the United States
- Location: Veirs Mill and Old Baltimore Rds., Rockville, Maryland
- Coordinates: 39°4′56″N 77°8′44″W
- Area: 7 acres (2.8 ha)
- Built: 1817
- Architectural style: Italianate, Queen Anne, Georgian
- NRHP reference No.: 78001476
- Added to NRHP: November 20, 1978

The Third Addition to Rockville and Old St. Mary's Church and Cemetery is a historic area located in Rockville, Montgomery County, Maryland. This area combines 19th century residential scale buildings with a tree-lined narrow street, country church, weathered headstones, Victorian Gothic railroad station, and a brick cast-iron front commercial structure, to create an atmosphere that evokes the era when the station served as the gateway to Rockville. In addition to Victorian Gothic, architectural styles used in residential buildings include Queen Anne, Georgian, and Colonial Revival. The area was listed on the National Register of Historic Places in 1978.

St. Mary's Church is significant as the County's first brick Catholic church, and the handsome hardware store is the area's last surviving cast-iron brick commercial structure. The Old St. Mary's Church Cemetery is the final resting place of author F. Scott Fitzgerald, his wife Zelda Fitzgerald and their daughter Frances Fitzgerald.

== Gallery ==
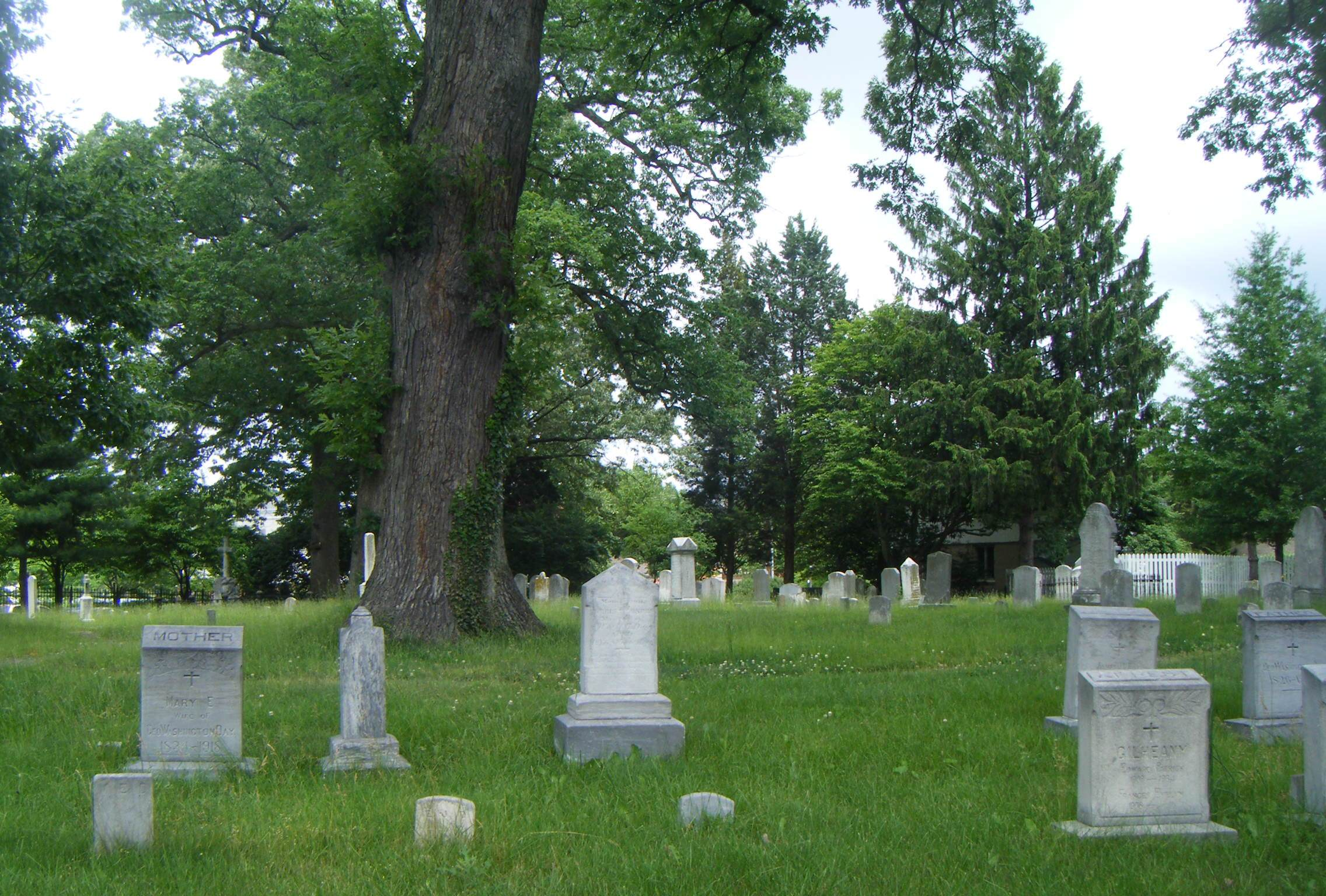
St. Mary's Church Cemetery. Author F. Scott Fitzgerald is buried there along with his wife Zelda

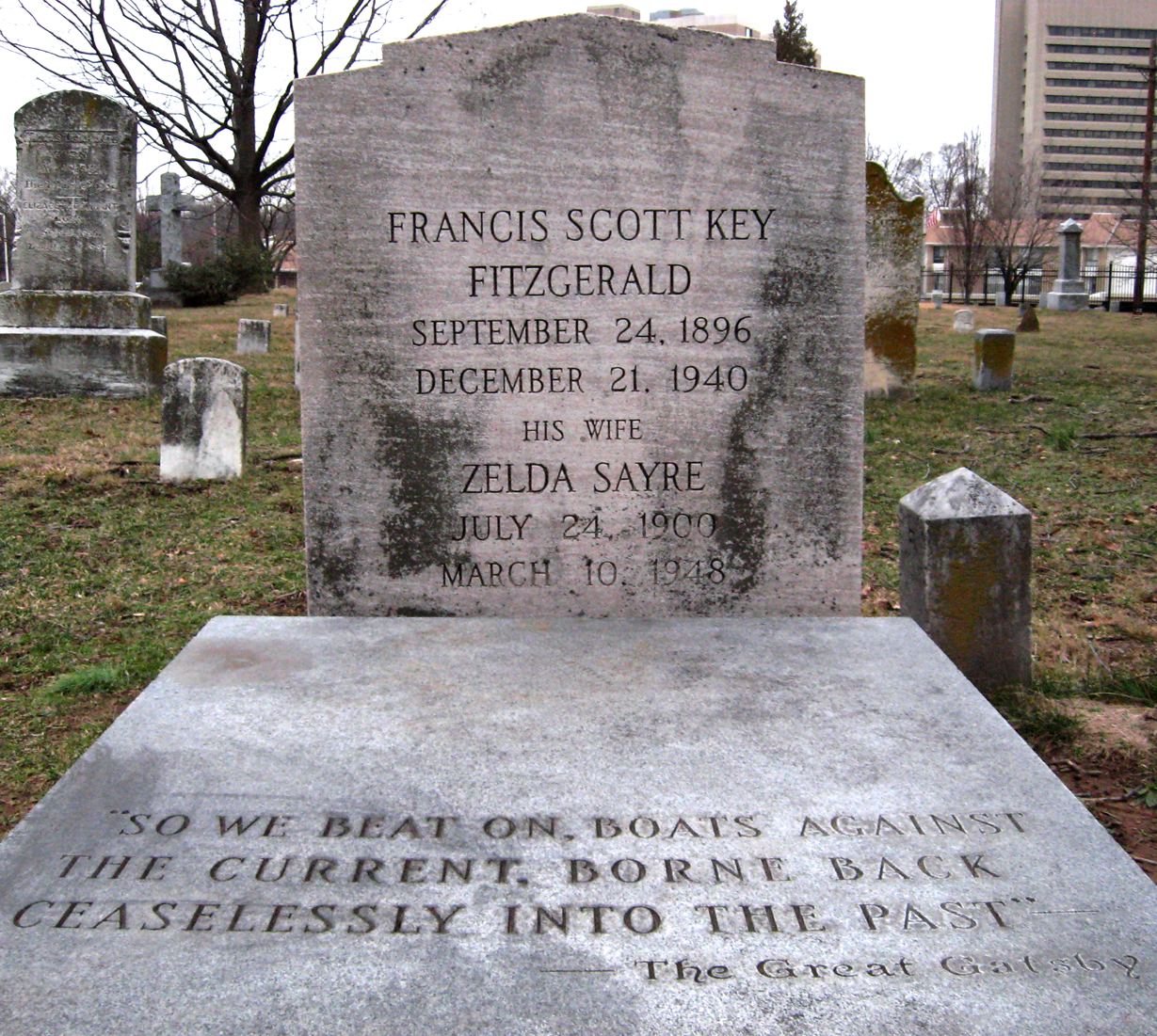
Fitzgerald grave

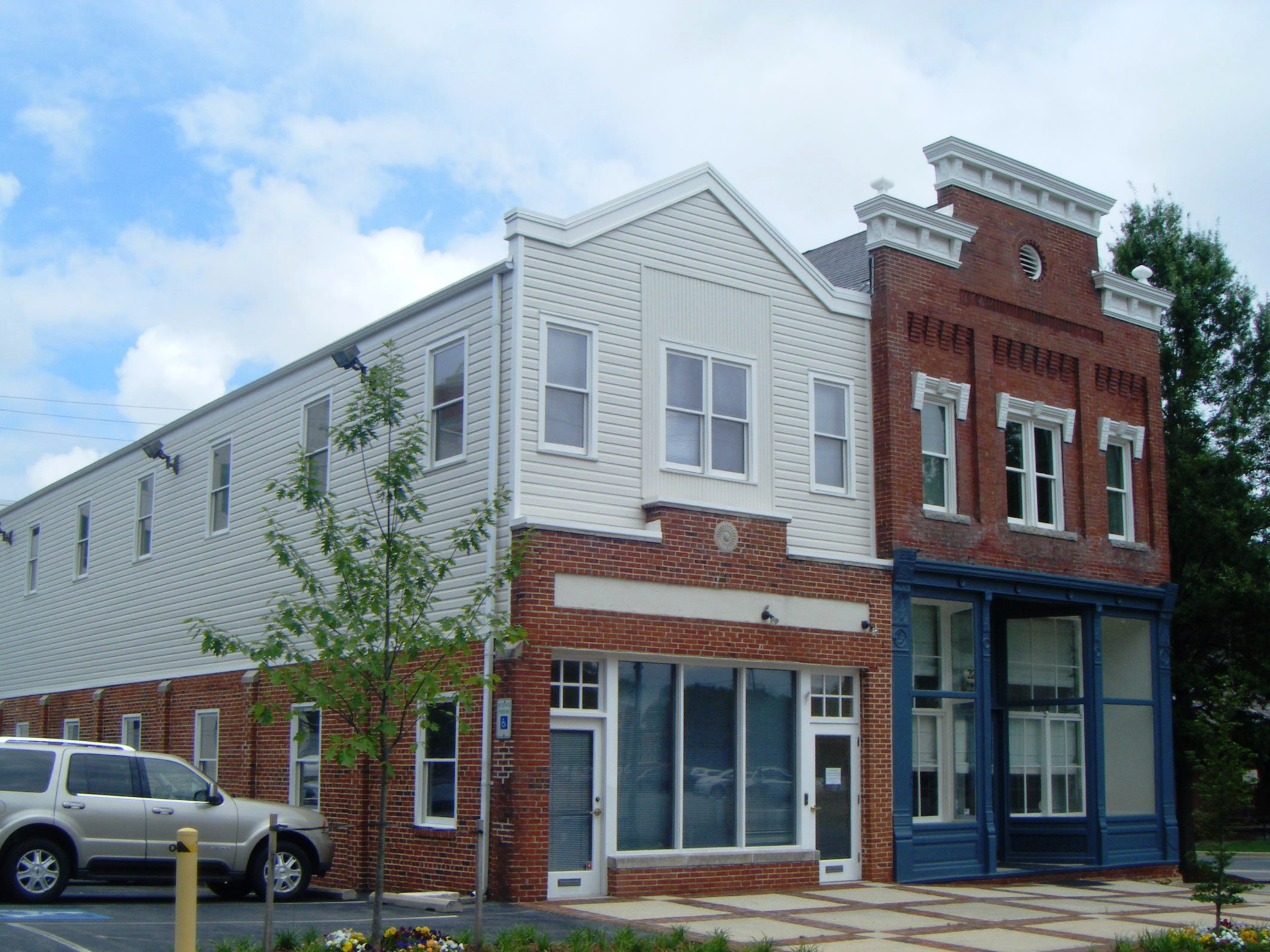
The old Wire Hardware Store
