= John J. Mitchell (banker) =

American banker (1853–1927)

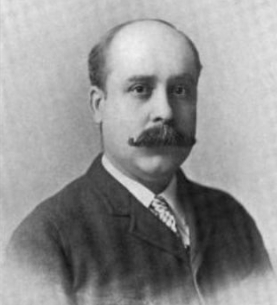
- Born: November 3, 1853; Alton, Illinois, US
- Died: October 29, 1927 (aged 73); Libertyville, Illinois, US
- Burial place: Graceland Cemetery
- Occupation: Banker
- Spouse: Mary Louise Jewett (m. 1890)
- Children: 5, including Jack Mitchell

Signature
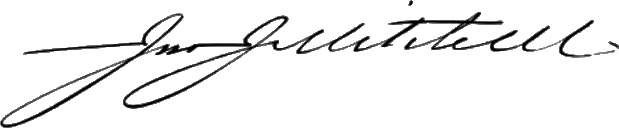

John James Mitchell (1853–1927) was an American banker, president of the Illinois Trust and Savings Bank and Illinois Merchants Trust Company.

== Biography ==
John J. Mitchell was born in Alton, Illinois, on November 3, 1853, the son of fellow banker William Hamilton Mitchell (1817–1910), and his first wife Lydia. He joined his father's Trust & Savings Bank as a messenger boy in 1873, and was president from 1880 to 1923, then president of its successor, the Illinois Merchants Trust Company, from 1923 until his death in 1927.

He married Mary Louise Jewett in 1890, and they had five children. His eldest son, William Hamilton Mitchell [wd], succeeded him at the helm of the Continental Illinois National Bank and later became the director of Texaco, one of the largest and most successful oil companies of the era. In 1918, William married Chicago socialite Ginevra King—the first love of writer F. Scott Fitzgerald—and inspired the character of Tom Buchanan in The Great Gatsby.

His younger son, the banker John J. "Jack" Mitchell, married J. Ogden Armour's daughter Lolita in 1920 at the family's estate in the upper-class enclave of Lake Forest, Illinois. By 1926, the extended Mitchell family had amassed in excess of $120 million (equivalent to $2.182330827×10^{9} in 2025).

His half-sister Hortense Lenore Mitchell (1871–1962) married the British architect, art dealer and collector Arthur Acton (1873–1953).

John J. Mitchell died in Libertyville, Illinois on October 29, 1927, from injuries suffered in a car accident which also claimed the life of his wife. He was buried at Graceland Cemetery in Chicago.

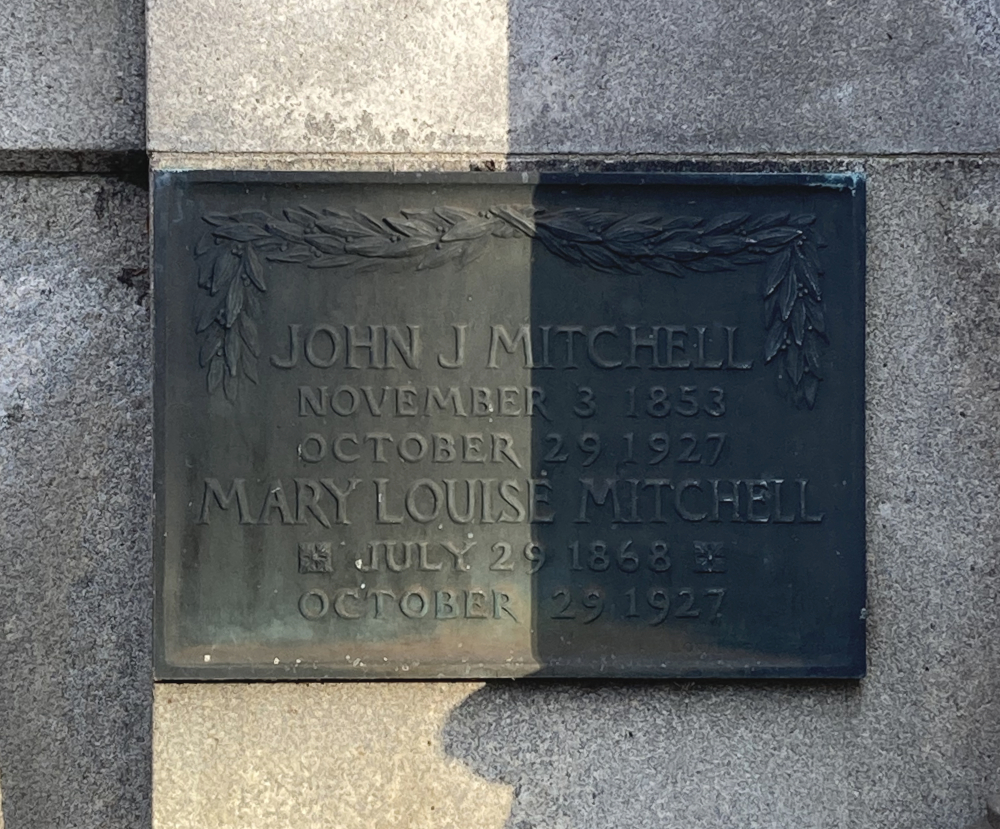
Mitchell's grave
