= Ginevra King =

American socialite and heiress (1898–1980)

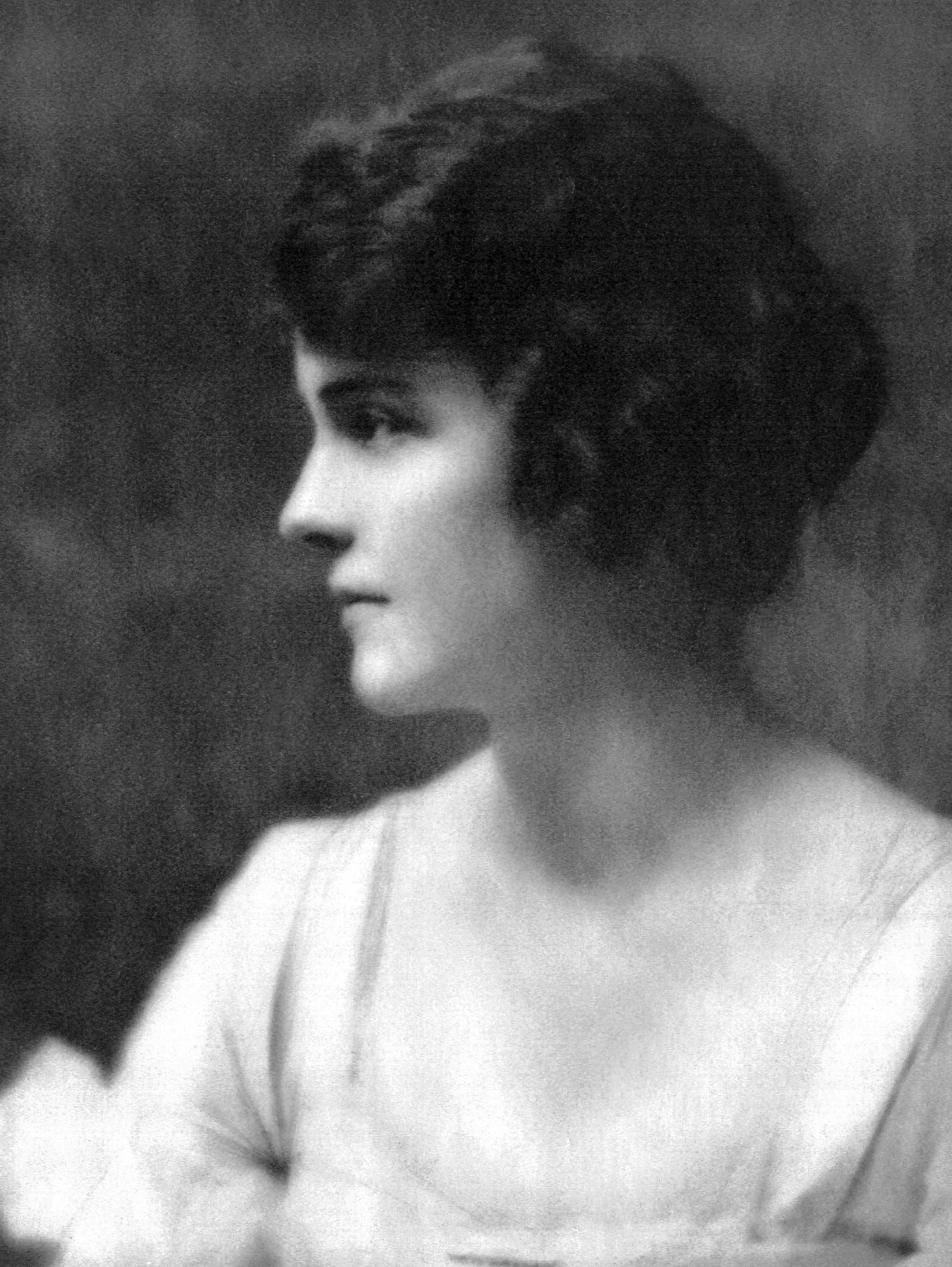
- A 20-year-old Ginevra King on the July 1918 cover of Town & Country magazine
- Born: November 30, 1898; Chicago, Illinois, U.S.
- Died: December 13, 1980 (aged 82); Charleston, South Carolina, U.S.
- Burial place: Lake Forest Cemetery
- Education: Westover School (expelled)
- Occupation: Socialite
- Spouses: William "Bill" Mitchell (m. 1918; div. 1939); John T. Pirie Jr. (m. 1942)
- Children: 3
- Relatives: John J. Mitchell (father-in-law); Jack Mitchell (brother-in-law); J. Ogden Armour (relative-in-law)

Ginevra King Pirie (November 30, 1898 – December 13, 1980) was an American socialite and heiress. As one of the self-proclaimed "Big Four" debutantes of Chicago during World War I, King inspired many characters in the novels and short stories of Jazz Age writer F. Scott Fitzgerald; in particular, the character of Daisy Buchanan in The Great Gatsby. At the age of 16, King met 18-year-old Fitzgerald at a sledding party in Saint Paul, Minnesota, and they shared a passionate romance from 1915 to 1917.

Although King was "madly in love" with Fitzgerald, their relationship ended when King's family intervened. Her father Charles Garfield King purportedly warned the young writer that "poor boys shouldn't think of marrying rich girls", and he forbade further courtship of his daughter. (Note: Ginevra King revealed details of her father's confrontation with Fitzgerald in a private meeting with actor Bruce Dern during the 1970s.) A heartbroken Fitzgerald dropped out of Princeton University and enlisted in the United States Army amid World War I. While courting his future wife Zelda Sayre and other young women when he was garrisoned near Montgomery, Alabama, Fitzgerald continued to write to King in the hope of rekindling their relationship.

While Fitzgerald served in the army, King's father arranged her marriage to William "Bill" Mitchell [wd], the son of his wealthy business associate John J. Mitchell. An avid polo player, Bill Mitchell became the director of Texaco, and he served partly as a model for Thomas "Tom" Buchanan in The Great Gatsby. (Note: Fitzgerald primarily based Tom Buchanan on Ginevra's father, Charles Garfield King. Like King, Buchanan is an imperious Yale man and polo player from Lake Forest. Another possible model was polo champion Tommy Hitchcock Jr., whom Fitzgerald met on Long Island.) Despite King marrying Mitchell and Fitzgerald marrying Zelda Sayre, Fitzgerald remained in love with King until his death. Fitzgerald scholar Maureen Corrigan wrote that King, far more than the author's wife Zelda Sayre, became "the love who lodged like an irritant in Fitzgerald's imagination, producing the literary pearl that is Daisy Buchanan". In the mind of Fitzgerald, King was the prototype of the unobtainable, upper-class woman who embodies the elusive American Dream.

During her relationship with Fitzgerald, Ginevra wrote a Gatsby-like story which she sent to the young author. In her story, she is trapped in a loveless marriage with a wealthy man yet still pines for Fitzgerald. The lovers are reunited only after Fitzgerald attains enough money to take her away from her adulterous husband. Fitzgerald kept Ginevra's story with him, and scholars have noted the plot similarities between Ginevra's story and Fitzgerald's novel.

King separated from Mitchell in 1937 after an unhappy marriage. A year later, Fitzgerald attempted to reunite with King when she visited Hollywood. The reunion proved a disaster due to Fitzgerald's alcoholism. A disappointed King returned to Chicago and she divorced Mitchell in 1939. She married John T. Pirie Jr., a business tycoon and owner of the Chicago department retailer Carson Pirie Scott & Company in 1942. She died in 1980 at age 82, at her estate in Charleston, South Carolina.

== Early life and education ==
Leonardo da Vinci's portrait Ginevra de' Benci, after which King, her mother, and grandmother, were named

Born in Chicago, on November 30, 1898, King was the eldest daughter of socialite Ginevra Fuller (1877–1964) and Chicago stockbroker Charles Garfield King (1874–1945). She had two younger sisters, Marjorie and Barbara. Like her mother and her grandmother, her name derived from Ginevra de' Benci, a 15th-century Florentine aristocratic woman whom Leonardo da Vinci painted in an eponymous work.

Raised in luxury at her family's sprawling estate in Lake Forest, Ginevra enjoyed a carefree life of riding polo ponies and playing tennis as well as engaging in private-school intrigues and country-club flirtations. Both sides of Ginevra's family were extravagantly wealthy and exclusively socialized with the other wealthy families in Chicago such as the Mitchells, Armours, Cudahys, Swifts, McCormicks, Palmers, and Chatfield-Taylors. The privileged children of these prominent Chicago families played together, attended the same private schools, and endogamously married within this small social circle.

Due to her family's immense wealth, the Chicago press chronicled Ginevra's mundane social activities, and newspaper columnists fêted the young Ginevra as one of the city's most desirable debutantes. As the center of attention in this environment, King developed "a clear sense of her family's wealth and position and, from an early age, a highly developed understanding of how social status worked". She socialized within an elite circle of other wealthy Chicago debutantes—self-proclaimed as the "Big Four" (Note: Contrary to several articles, "The Big Four" young women invented the name for themselves, and the Chicago press never used the name.)—which included her friends Edith Cummings, Courtney Letts, and Margaret Carry:

The [Big Four] girls went to dances and house parties together, and they were seen as a foursome on the golf links and tennis courts at Onwentsia. If other girls were jealous, Ginevra and her three friends did not care. The Big Four was complete; it would admit no further members.

"She's got an indiscreet voice," I remarked."It's full of—" I hesitated.

"Her voice is full of money," he said suddenly.

That was it. I'd never understood before. It was full of money—that was the inexhaustible charm that rose and fell in it, the jingle of it, the cymbals' song of it.... High in the white palace the king's daughter, the golden girl....

— F. Scott Fitzgerald, The Great Gatsby

As a privileged teenager cocooned in a small circle of wealthy Protestant families, King developed a notorious self-centeredness, and she purportedly lacked introspection. Intensely competitive, King disliked losing to anyone at anything—tennis, golf or basketball. This competitiveness did not extend to her academic studies. Although she completed her schoolwork, she disliked learning and instead preferred parties where she could sit up late gossiping with her Big Four friends. Her closest friend in the Big Four quartet, Edith Cummings, became one of the premier amateur golfers during the Jazz Age and served as the model for the character of Jordan Baker in Fitzgerald's 1925 novel The Great Gatsby.

In 1914, King's father sent Ginevra to Middlebury, Connecticut, to attend the Westover School, an exclusive finishing school for the daughters of America's wealthiest families. Her Westover schoolmates included such notable persons as Isabel Stillman Rockefeller of the Rockefeller dynasty, as well as Margaret Livingston Bush and Mary Eleanor Bush, (Note: Margaret Livingston Bush, the sister of Prescott Sheldon Bush, served as a trustee of the Westover School in Middlebury, Connecticut.) the aunts of President George H. W. Bush. The school prided itself on inculcating a sense of noblesse oblige in its pupils. Many of Westover's attendees became the wives of wealthy men who sought fulfillment as society hostesses and, if they wished, in helping those less privileged.

== Romance with Fitzgerald ==
Some day—Scott—some day. Perhaps in a year—two—three—We'll have that perfect hour! I want it—and so we'll have it! It may be different then but after a while we would be brought back to the way I feel now...

— Ginevra King, Letter to F. Scott Fitzgerald, February 1915

While visiting her Westover roommate Marie Hersey in St. Paul, Minnesota, (Note: Prior to meeting King, Fitzgerald had a "crush" on her roommate Marie Hersey, whom he knew as a boy in St. Paul, Minnesota.) 16-year-old Ginevra King met 18-year-old F. Scott Fitzgerald at a sledding party on Summit Avenue on January 4, 1915. At the time, Fitzgerald was a sophomore at Princeton University. The two teenagers fell in love. Fitzgerald described this petting encounter in a short story: "It was the sleigh ride he remembered most and kissing her cool cheeks in the straw in one corner while she laughed up at the cold white stars. The couple next to them had their backs turned and he kissed her little neck and her ears and never her lips."

After this flirtatious encounter under the stars in Minnesota, Ginevra returned to Westover in Connecticut, and Fitzgerald returned to nearby Princeton in New Jersey. He deluged Ginevra with correspondence which pleased her as she measured her popularity "by which boys wrote to her and how many letters she received". Against his wishes, Ginevra read Fitzgerald's intimate letters aloud to her Westover classmates and rival suitors for their amusement. At one point, Ginevra asked for a photograph of him as she coyly professed to recall only that he had "yellow hair and big blue eyes". Despite such coyness, Ginevra regarded Scott as among the more important of her many romantic conquests due to his handsome good looks and Princeton standing.

The lovers corresponded for months and exchanged photographs. Over time, their letters became passionate. Ginevra began having dreams about Scott and "slept with his letters" in the hope "that dreams about him would come in the night". Fitzgerald visited Westover several times, and Ginevra professed in her diary to be "madly in love with him". In March 1915, Fitzgerald asked Ginevra to be his date for Princeton's sophomore prom, but Ginevra's mother forbade Ginevra to attend as the consort of a middle-class young man. "I'm so [disappointed] about the dance I can't see straight," Ginevra wrote Scott. Despite this setback, they met again in June in New York. They dined at the Ritz and saw two Broadway plays, Nobody Home and Midnight Frolic. Fitzgerald wrote that Ginevra "made luminous the Ritz roof on a brief passage through [New York]."

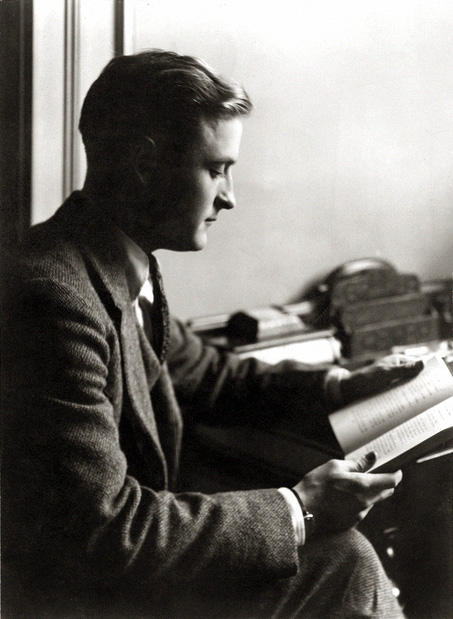
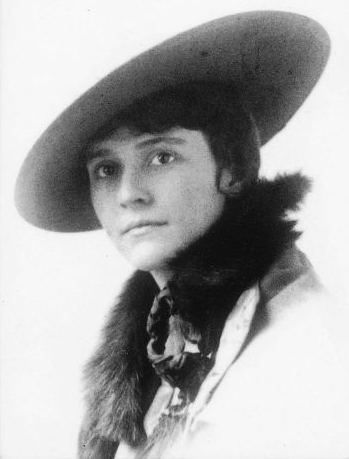
Writer F. Scott Fitzgerald's romance and life-long obsession with Ginevra King inspired the plot of his 1925 novel The Great Gatsby. As one of the wealthiest socialites in the Midwest, King was often fêted in the press as among Chicago's most desirable debutantes.

As the months passed, King and Fitzgerald rendezvoused in different locations, and they discussed—perhaps lightheartedly—eloping. In February–March 1916, Fitzgerald wrote a short story titled "The Perfect Hour" in which he imagined Ginevra and himself blissfully together at last, and he mailed the love story to her by post as a token of his affection. Ginevra read the story aloud to a rival suitor who generously praised Fitzgerald's writing as excellent.

In response to Fitzgerald's "The Perfect Hour" tale, Ginevra herself wrote a Gatsby-like short story which she sent to Fitzgerald on March 6. In her story, she is trapped in a loveless marriage with a wealthy man yet still pines for Fitzgerald, a former lover from her past. The two lovers are reunited only after Fitzgerald attains enough money to take her away from her adulterous husband. Fitzgerald kept Ginevra's story with him until his death, and scholars have noted the plot similarities between Ginevra's story and Fitzgerald's work The Great Gatsby.

Despite Fitzgerald's frequent visits and love letters, Ginevra continued entertaining other suitors. (Note: One rival for Ginevra's affections, Deering Davis, married Jazz Age film star Louise Brooks in 1933 and socialite Etti Plesch in 1949.) "At this time," Ginevra later explained, "I was definitely out for quantity not quality in beaux, and, although Scott was top man, I still wasn't serious enough not to want plenty of other attention!" At the time, she wrote apologetically to Scott, "I know I am a flirt and I can't stop it".

On May 22, 1916, Westover School expelled Ginevra for flirting with a crowd of young male admirers from her dormitory window. Mary Robbins Hillard, the stern headmistress of Westover school, declared King to be a "bold, bad hussy" and an "adventuress", a derogatory term referring to a woman who ensnares wealthy men in order to increase her social position. After legal threats by Ginevra's imperious and influential father, a cowed Hillard readmitted King to the school, but her father—irate at Westover's treatment of his beloved daughter—decided that she instead would complete her education at a New York finishing school. Ginevra recounted these events in her diary:

After all the things that demon [Mary Robbins Hillard] had told me, she was as sweet as sugar to Father, even if he did tell her a few plain truths about herself—You wouldn't have known her for the same woman. She was all smiles, and agreed heartily when Father said he thought the best thing to do would be to take me home, and she was sweet as anything to me when I said "goodbye" to her.... Since then Pa has gotten a letter [from Hillard] flattering me to the skies, and Father answered her by ripping her clean up the back.

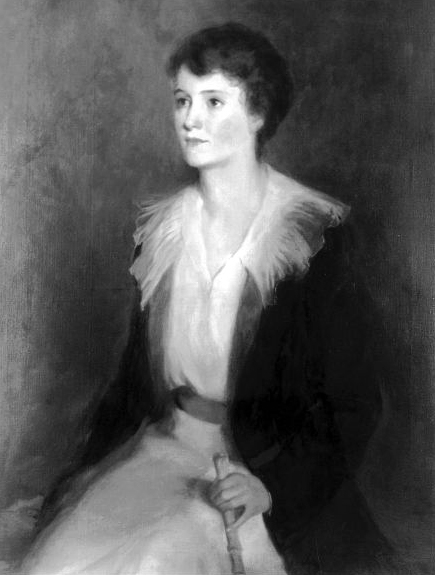
Portrait of Ginevra King, June 1915

A shocked Fitzgerald regarded Ginevra's expulsion from Westover as a catastrophe that doomed both their relationship and his dreams. He later remarked to his daughter Scottie on the fated quality of the incident: "It was in the cards that Ginevra King should get fired from Westover". Due to Ginevra's abrupt expulsion, Fitzgerald could no longer visit her frequently from nearby Princeton, and he could no longer court her in the relatively egalitarian collegiate atmosphere which obscured his lack of wealth. Instead, he would be forced to continue his romantic pursuit of Ginevra at her family's villa in Lake Forest under the judgmental eyes of her class-conscious parents and in hopeless competition with the scions of affluent Chicago families.

Following her expulsion from Westover, Fitzgerald visited Ginevra in August 1916 at her family's Lake Forest villa. The visit proved to be a disaster. Although Ginevra and Fitzgerald enjoyed a "petting party", (Note: Fitzgerald had sex partners prior to Zelda Sayre. He solicited a prostitute in March 1916 during a moment of despair over Ginevra King.) Fitzgerald's ledger notes the presence of a romantic competitor, "beautiful" William "Bill" Mitchell, the son of Charles Garfield King's wealthy business associate John J. Mitchell. Now in competition with Bill Mitchell, Fitzgerald's reception at the villa by Ginevra's parents proved less hospitable. At the time, the predominantly White Anglo-Saxon Protestant community of Lake Forest socially excluded others such as Black and Jewish people, and the presence of a middle-class Irish Catholic parvenu such as Fitzgerald likely caused a stir.

There is much speculation regarding what transpired during Fitzgerald's final visit in August 1916. Stockbroker Charles Garfield King likely became irritated by Fitzgerald's pursuit of his daughter. He allegedly interrogated the 19-year-old Fitzgerald regarding his financial prospects. Disappointed by Fitzgerald's answers, he purportedly forbade further courtship of his daughter and instructed Ginevra to drive Fitzgerald to the nearest train station. Either Ginevra's father or someone else remarked, loud enough to be heard by the young Fitzgerald, that "poor boys shouldn't think of marrying rich girls". This line appears in the 1974 and 2013 film adaptations of The Great Gatsby.

Due to his middle-class status and her family's intervention, the relationship between King and Fitzgerald stagnated. Two months later, in November 1916, their final encounter as a romantic couple occurred when Ginevra visited the Princeton campus for a Princeton–Yale football game. King and Fitzgerald rendezvoused amid the Roman colonnades of Penn Station. King later admitted that she had begun secretly dating a Yale student in New York by this time, and this complicated her rendezvous with Fitzgerald who was unaware of the other young man awaiting her attentions:

My girlfriend and I had made plans to meet some other, uh, friends. So we said good-bye [to Scott], 'we were going back to school, thanks so much.' Behind the huge pillars in the [train] station there were two guys waiting for us—Yale boys. We couldn't just walk out and leave them standing behind the pillars. Then we were scared to death we'd run into Scott and his friend. But we didn't.

In January 1917, the final break between King and Fitzgerald occurred. By this time, likely echoing her father's opinion of Fitzgerald, Ginevra discounted the young writer as a suitable match because of his middle-class status. According to scholar James L. W. West, Ginevra scrutinized Fitzgerald "against the backdrop of Lake Forest by that time, as opposed to seeing him at her school," and she realized he "didn't fit in" with the elite social milieu of the wealthy upper class. A heartbroken Fitzgerald claimed that King rejected his love with "supreme boredom and indifference", and he viewed Ginevra as a rich socialite who merely toyed with his sincere affections before casting him aside. In his mind, Ginevra became—much like Daisy Buchanan—one of the "careless people" of the privileged class who "smashed up things … then retreated back into their money." In the wake of Ginevra's rejection, a distraught Fitzgerald dropped out of Princeton and enlisted in the United States Army amid World War I.

== Arranged marriage to Mitchell ==
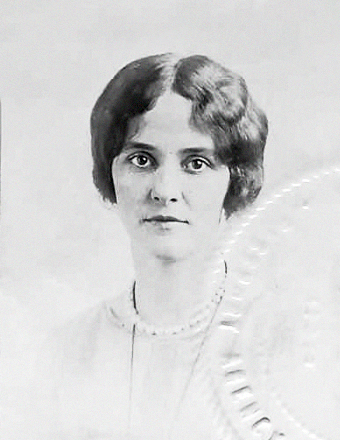
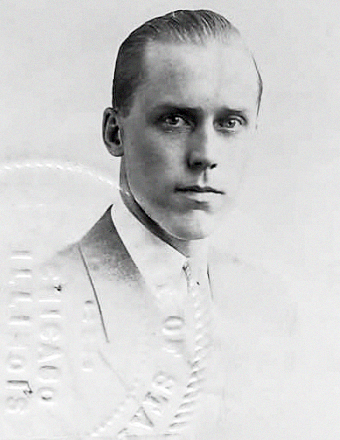
Passport photos of newlyweds Ginevra King and Bill Mitchell circa 1918. King inspired the character of Daisy Buchanan and Mitchell partly inspired the character of Tom Buchanan in The Great Gatsby.

While stationed as an army officer near Montgomery, Alabama, Fitzgerald continued writing Ginevra and begged to resume their relationship. During this interlude, Ginevra's father arranged her marriage to a business associate's son as a merger between two elite families.

On July 15, 1918, King wrote to Fitzgerald and informed him of her engagement to polo player William "Bill" Mitchell, the son of banker John J. Mitchell, president of the Illinois Trust & Savings Bank and a friend of Charles Garfield King with whom he shared offices in downtown Chicago. "To say I am the happiest girl on earth would be expressing it mildly," King wrote in a letter to Fitzgerald. "I wish you knew Bill so that you could know how very lucky I am."

According to scholar James L. W. West, "Ginevra's marriage to Bill Mitchell was a dynastic affair very much approved by both sets of parents. In fact Bill's younger brother, Clarence, would marry Ginevra's younger sister Marjorie a few years later." By consenting to marry the son of her father's business associate, Ginevra "made the same choice Daisy Buchanan did, accepting the safe haven of money rather than waiting for a truer love to come along."

Ginevra King married Bill Mitchell at St. Chrysostom's Episcopal Church in Chicago, Illinois, on September 4, 1918. Newspapers lauded the event as one of the most attended weddings of the season. As the arranged marriage occurred amid World War I, a Chicago Tribune columnist described the wedding ceremony as a "war wedding" and heralded the occasion as "the triumph of youth." Columnists gushed over "the extreme youth of the bridal couple, their gay and gallant air, their uncommon good looks, the distinguished appearance of both sets of parents, the smart frocks and becoming uniforms, all made an impression of something brilliant, charming, and cheerful." The wedding ceremony featured "great garlands of fruit, that Luca della Robbia himself might have designed, [which] outlined the [chapel] arches. The altar, with its wonderful blue reredos was adorned with flowers in blue vases set on a piece of filet lace, rich and rare enough for a royal marriage." After the ceremony, Mitchell's parents hosted a lavish wedding reception at the Blackstone Hotel.

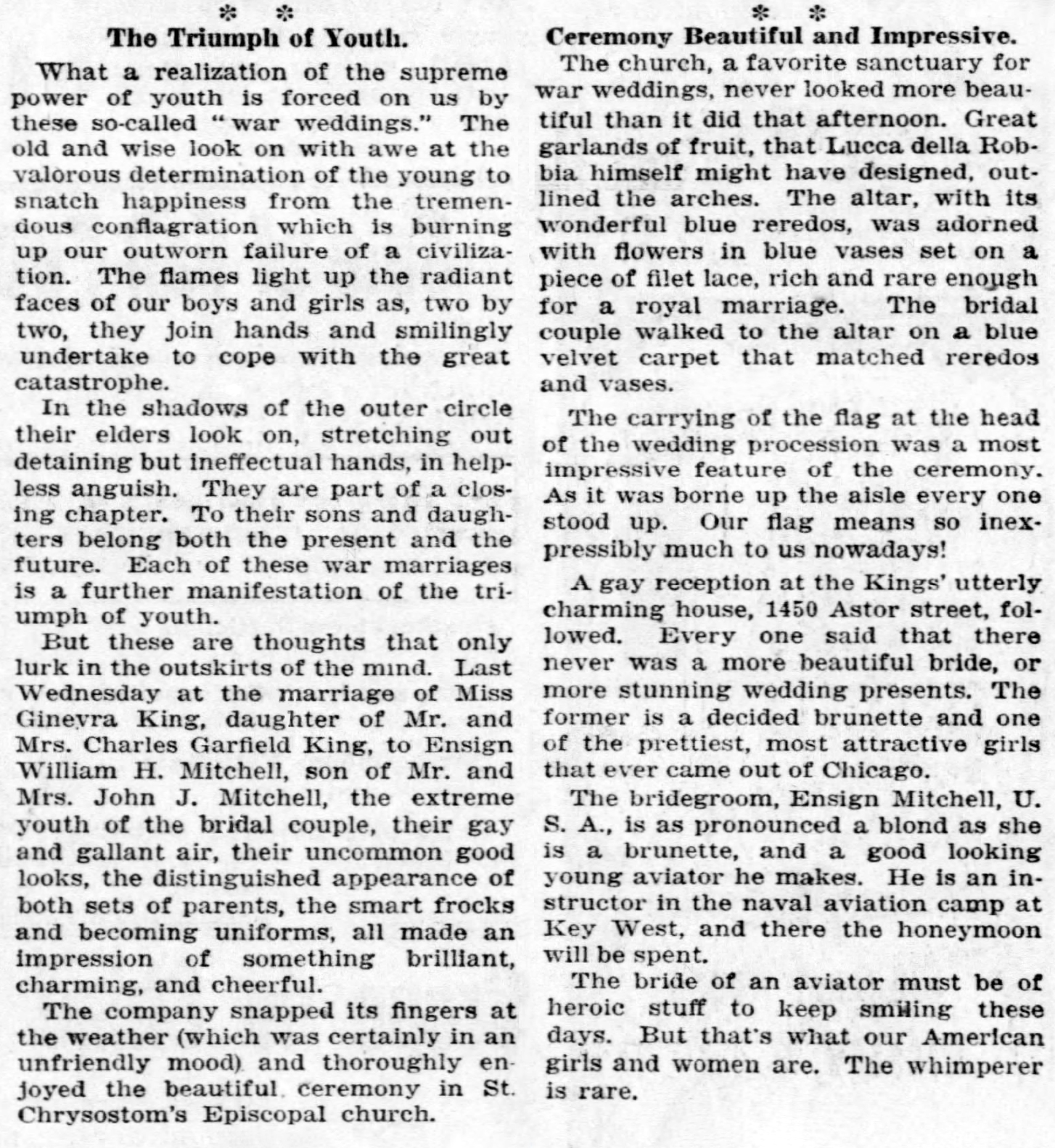
Chicago Tribune article describing King's wedding which Fitzgerald kept in his scrapbook with the note: "The end of a once poignant story."

Although Ginevra invited Fitzgerald to the wedding, he could not attend as he was stationed as an army officer in Montgomery, Alabama. He placed the wedding invitation, newspaper clippings reporting the ceremony, and a piece of Ginevra's handkerchief in his scrapbook with the note: "THE END OF A ONCE POIGNANT STORY." Three days after Ginevra's wedding, on September 7, 1918, a lonely Fitzgerald professed his affections to Zelda Sayre, (Note: According to biographer Nancy Milford, "if there was a Confederate establishment in the Deep South, Zelda Sayre came from the heart of it". Zelda's grandfather was Confederate Senator Willis B. Machen. Her father's uncle was John Tyler Morgan, a Confederate general in the American Civil War and the second Grand Dragon of the Ku Klux Klan in Alabama. Her family built the home used by Jefferson Davis for the White House of the Confederacy.) a Southern belle whom he had met in Montgomery and who reminded him of Ginevra. A year and a half later, on April 3, 1920, Fitzgerald married Sayre in a simple ceremony at St. Patrick's Cathedral, New York. At the time of their wedding, Fitzgerald later claimed neither he nor Zelda loved each other, and the early years of their marriage in New York City proved to be a disappointment.

Despite King marrying Bill Mitchell and Fitzgerald marrying Zelda Sayre, Fitzgerald remained forever in love with King until his death and "could not think of her without tears coming to his eyes". In the years that followed, the emotional toll of King's rejection contributed to his incipient alcoholism. After failing to win her due to his lack of wealth, Fitzgerald grew embittered towards the upper class. In 1926, he wrote: "Let me tell you about the very rich. They are different from you and me. They possess and enjoy early, and it does something to them, makes them soft where we are hard, and cynical where we are trustful, in a way that, unless you were born rich, it is very difficult to understand. They think, deep in their hearts, that they are better than we are." For the rest of his life, Fitzgerald harbored a resentment towards the wealthy.

King and Mitchell had three children, William, Charles, and Ginevra. Her second son Charles was born with Down syndrome and required constant care. Ultimately, the arranged marriage between King and Mitchell proved tumultuous and unhappy, and the couple had difficulty residing in the same house together. Despite marital discord, Bill Mitchell rose to become the director of the Continental Illinois National Bank and Texaco, and he partly inspired the character of Tom Buchanan in The Great Gatsby. His brother, banker Jack Mitchell, co-founded United Airlines and married the only daughter of magnate J. Ogden Armour, the second-richest man in the United States after John D. Rockefeller. By 1926, the extended Mitchell family had amassed in excess of $120 million (equivalent to $2.1 billion in 2023).

== Reunion and later years ==
As they walked inside, their voices jingled the words 'all these years', and Donald felt a sinking in his stomach... It was like a college reunion—but there the failure to find the past was disguised by the hurried boisterous occasion. Aghast, he realized that this might be a long and empty hour.

— F. Scott Fitzgerald, "Three Hours Between Planes", July 1941

By the Summer of 1937, the arranged marriage between King and Mitchell had dissolved, and the couple was estranged. During this year, King began an extramarital affair with paramour John T. Pirie, Jr., whom she met during an exclusive North Shore fox hunt. Pirie was the heir presumptive to the Chicago department retailer Carson Pirie Scott & Company.

During the posh fox hunt, Pirie's horse balked at jumping a fence and hurled him to the ground in an unconscious heap. Trailing behind Pirie on her own horse, Ginevra saw him lying motionless on the grass and leaped to the ground. She hovered over Pirie until an ambulance arrived, clambered into the ambulance after him, and stayed with the retail magnate for the remainder of her life.

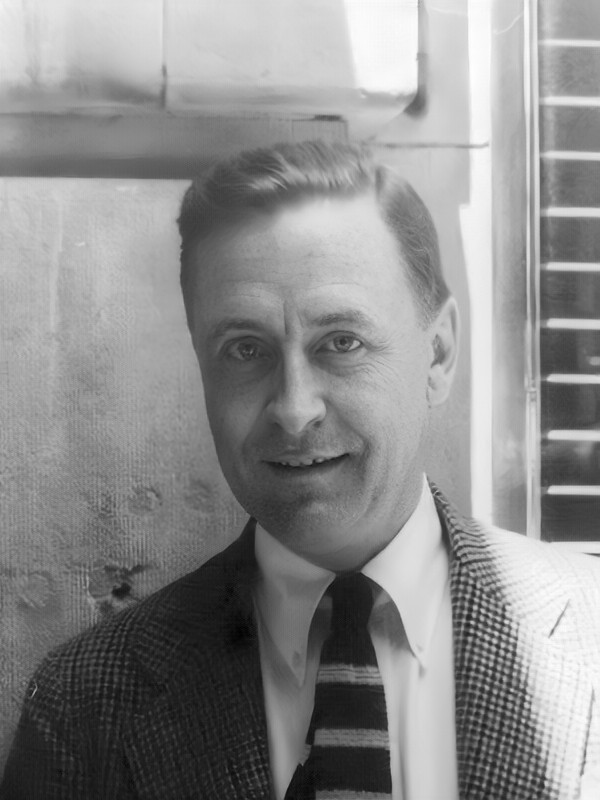
Fitzgerald in 1937, roughly a year before his final meeting with Ginevra King

One year later, in October 1938, Ginevra rendezvoused with a physically ailing Fitzgerald for the last time at the Beverly Wilshire Hotel in Hollywood. (Note: Fitzgerald's alcoholism undermined his health by the late 1930s. His alcoholism resulted in cardiomyopathy, coronary artery disease, angina, dyspnea, and syncopal spells. As his health deteriorated, Fitzgerald feared he would die from congested lungs.) "She was the first girl I ever loved, and I have faithfully avoided seeing her up to this moment to keep the illusion perfect," an unwell Fitzgerald informed his daughter Scottie, shortly before the meeting. The reunion between King and Fitzgerald proved a disaster due to the author's alcoholism.

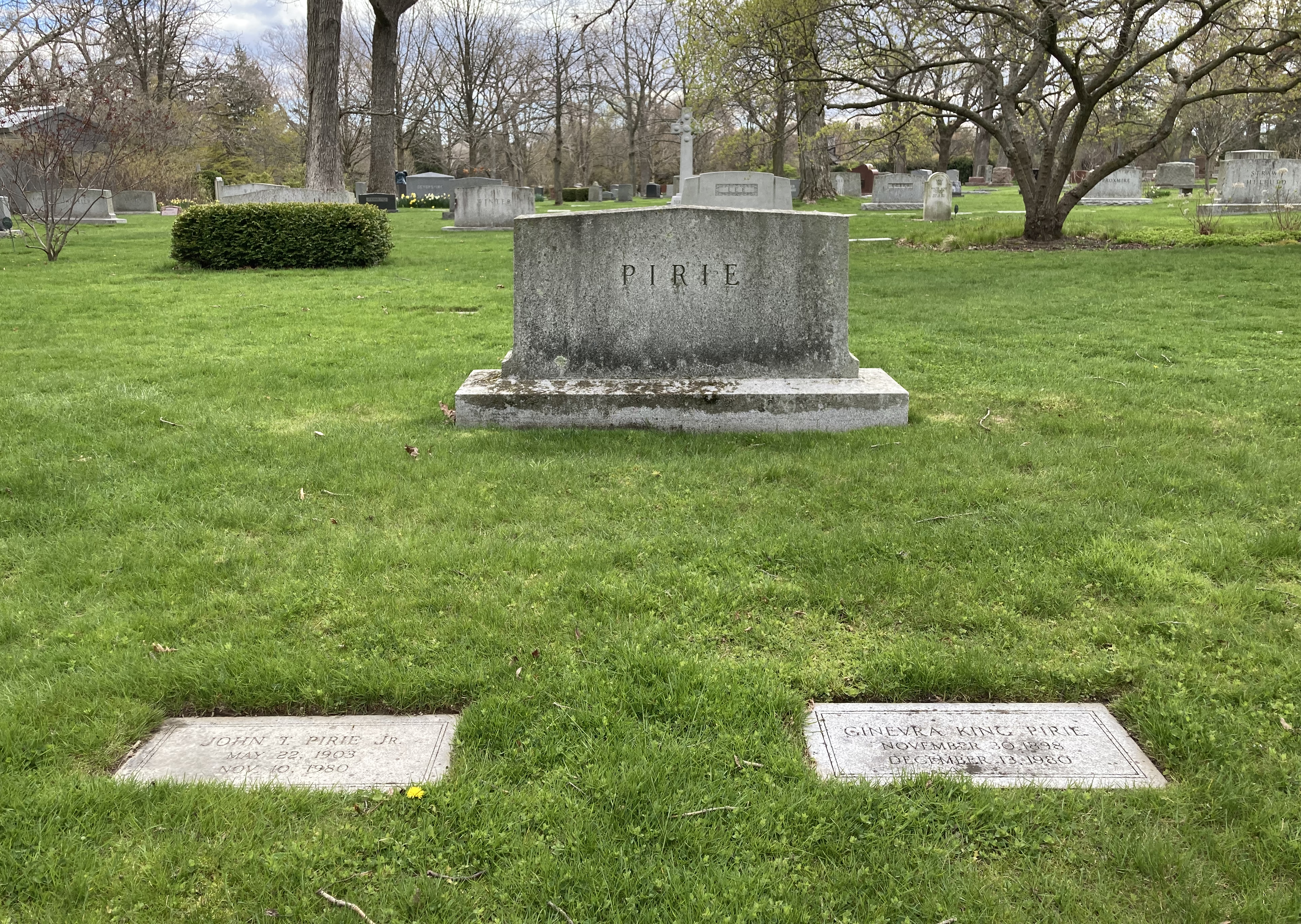
King's grave at Lake Forest Cemetery

Although "on the wagon" for months, the sight of Ginevra ostensibly broke Fitzgerald's resolve. After reminiscing over lunch, Fitzgerald lingered with Ginevra at the hotel bar. Shortly before Ginevra's departure, which Fitzgerald thought would be their final meeting, the forlorn author began downing double shots of gin. When Ginevra asked if she had inspired any characters in Fitzgerald's novel The Beautiful and Damned, an inebriated Fitzgerald quipped: "Which bitch do you think you are?" (Note: Fitzgerald's demeanor when stating this quip is unknown, and James L. West III posits this remark was perhaps said in jest: "He might have said it playfully rather than savagely. That sounds more in character for him. He was not a cruel man.") On this note, they parted forever. Fitzgerald used this final meeting as the basis for his 1941 short story (posthumously published), "Three Hours Between Planes". Two years later, the 44-year-old author died of occlusive coronary arteriosclerosis on December 21, 1940.

In 1939, following the death of her 16-year-old disabled son Charles from pneumonia, Ginevra—who already had been living with businessman John T. Pirie—formally divorced Bill Mitchell. After their divorce, Bill Mitchell married heiress Sara Anne Wood, the daughter of General Robert E. Wood who spent three decades as chairman of Sears, Roebuck & Company. In April 1942, King married John T. Pirie, Jr. in a quiet ceremony. Three years later, in September 1945, Ginevra's father Charles Garfield King died at Passavant Hospital in Chicago at the age of 77. By the time of Charles Garfield King's death, the deceased Fitzgerald had experienced a posthumous revival, and the author whom the stockbroker once scorned had become one of the most famous names in America.

In January 1951, Fitzgerald's daughter Scottie sent Ginevra a copy of her letters which the author had kept with him until his death. Reviewing her teenage letters to Fitzgerald, Ginevra commented: "I managed to gag through them, although I was staggering with boredom at myself by the time I was through. Goodness, what a self-centered little ass I was!" "I was too thoughtless in those days," she recalled, "and too much in love with love to think of consequences." King later founded the Ladies Guild of the American Cancer Society. She died in 1980 at the age of 82 at her family's estate in Charleston, South Carolina. She was buried at Lake Forest Cemetery in Illinois.

== Legacy and influence ==
I've just had rather an unpleasant afternoon. There was a—man I cared about. He told me out of a clear sky that he was poor as a church-mouse. He'd never even hinted it before.... You see, if I'd thought of him as poor—well, I've been mad about loads of poor men, and fully intended to marry them all. But in this case, I hadn't thought of him that way and my interest in him wasn't strong enough to survive the shock.

— Judy Jones, in F. Scott Fitzgerald's Winter Dreams, December 1922

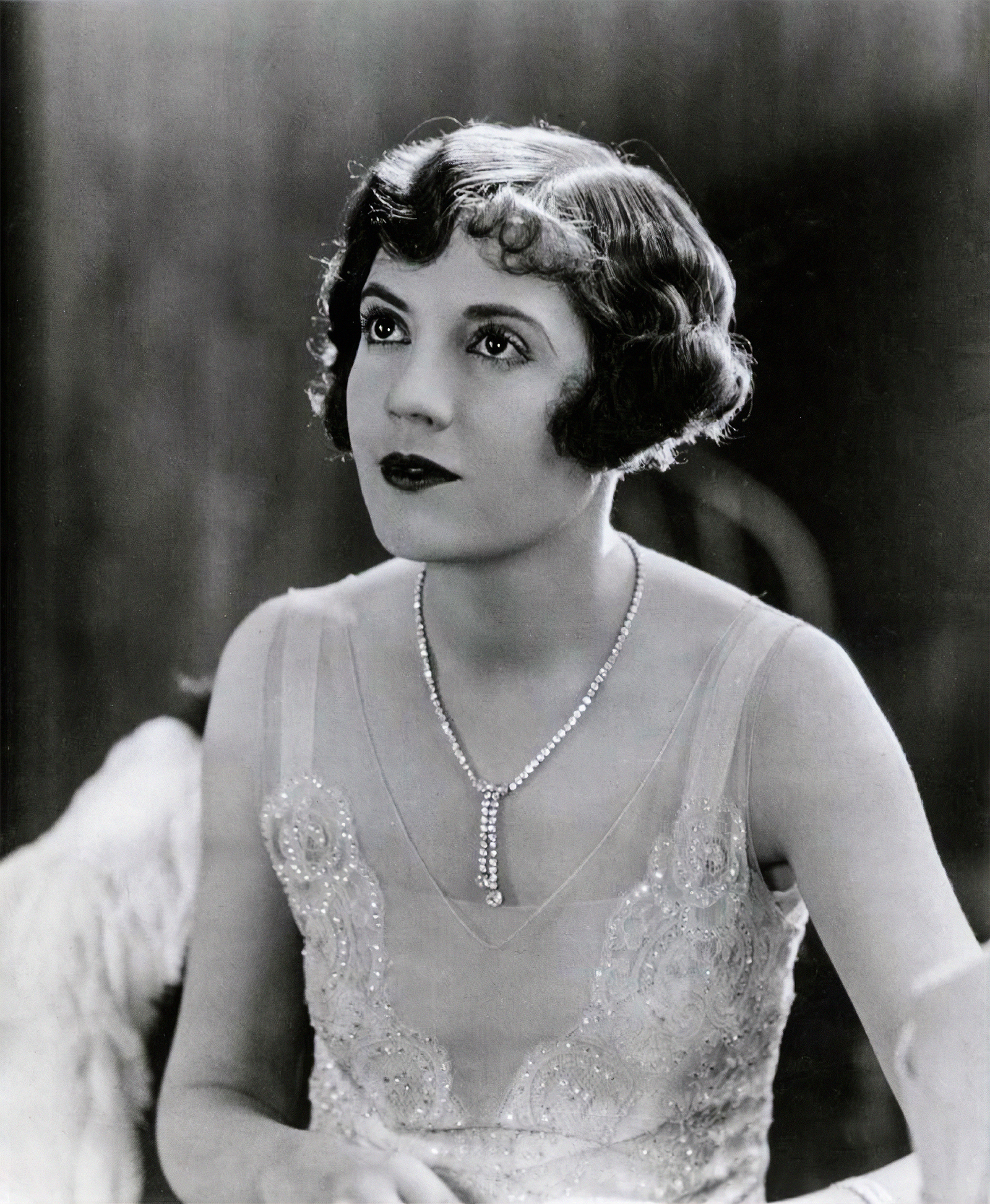
King inspired the character of Daisy Buchanan in The Great Gatsby (portrayed by actress Lois Wilson).

Ginevra King exerted a tremendous influence on Fitzgerald's writing, far more so than his wife Zelda Sayre. Decades after their passionate romance, Fitzgerald described Ginevra as "my first girl 18–20 whom I've used over and over [in my writing] and never forgotten". Scholar Maureen Corrigan notes that "because she's the one who got away, Ginevra—even more than Zelda—is the love who lodged like an irritant in Fitzgerald's imagination, producing the literary pearl that is Daisy Buchanan".

In the mind of the author, King became the prototype of the unobtainable, upper-class woman who embodies the elusive American Dream. In contrast to earlier American authors who viewed the American Dream with considerable optimism, Fitzgerald's literary works such as The Great Gatsby depict the American Dream as an illusion since the pursuit of the dream—much like Fitzgerald's pursuit of Ginevra—only results in dissatisfaction for those who chase it, owing to its unattainability.

In addition to Daisy Buchanan in The Great Gatsby (1925), Fitzgerald's literary oeuvre abounds with characters modeled after and inspired by King, including:

- Helen Halcyon in "The Debutante" (1917)
- Isabelle Borgé in This Side of Paradise (1920)
- Kismine Washington in "The Diamond as Big as the Ritz" (1922)
- Judy Jones in "Winter Dreams" (1922)
- Paula Legendre in "The Rich Boy" (1924)
- Josephine Perry in The Basil and Josephine Stories (1928)
- Nancy Holmes in "Three Hours Between Planes" (1941)
- Their meeting in "Babes in the Woods" (1917), from the collection Bernice Bobs Her Hair and Other Stories, was reused in This Side of Paradise.

King is featured in the books The Perfect Hour: The Romance of F. Scott Fitzgerald and Ginevra King by James L. W. West III and in a fictionalized form in Gatsby's Girl by Caroline Preston. The musical The Pursuit of Persephone tells the story of King's romance with Fitzgerald. She appears in West of Sunset by Stewart O'Nan, a fictionalized account of Fitzgerald's final years.

== See also ==
- Edith Cummings, a friend of King's and the inspiration for the character of Jordan Baker
- Big Four, a quartet of wealthy debutantes famous in Chicago during World War I
