= Jack Mitchell (banker) =

American banker, United Airlines co-founder

- Born: John James Mitchell Jr. April 28, 1897; Chicago, Illinois, U.S.
- Died: April 7, 1985 (aged 87); Montecito, California, U.S.
- Education: Yale University
- Occupation: Banker
- Known for: co-founded United Airlines
- Board member of: United Airlines (1937-1979)
- Spouses: Lolita Armour (m. 1921; div. 1941) Olga Voronseva Varchavshia (m. 1942)
- Children: 3
- Father: John James Mitchell
- Relatives: J. Ogden Armour (father-in-law)

John James Mitchell Jr. (April 28, 1897 – April 7, 1985) was an American banker and a co-founder of United Airlines.

== Early life ==
He was born on April 28, 1897, in Chicago, the son of John James Mitchell (1853–1927), president of the Illinois Trust and Savings Bank and Illinois Merchants Trust Company. He was educated at Yale University, then served as an aviator with the US Navy in World War I.

Mitchell's brother, William "Bill" Mitchell, became the director of Texaco and the Continental Illinois National Bank. William married Chicago socialite Ginevra King—the first love of writer F. Scott Fitzgerald—and inspired the character of Thomas "Tom" Buchanan in The Great Gatsby.

== Career ==
He co-founded National Air Transport, which evolved into United Airlines. He was a member of the board of directors of United Airlines from 1937 to 1979.

In 1929 Mitchell bought a large property on Zaca Lake near Santa Barbara, California, and named it Rancho Juan y Lolita.

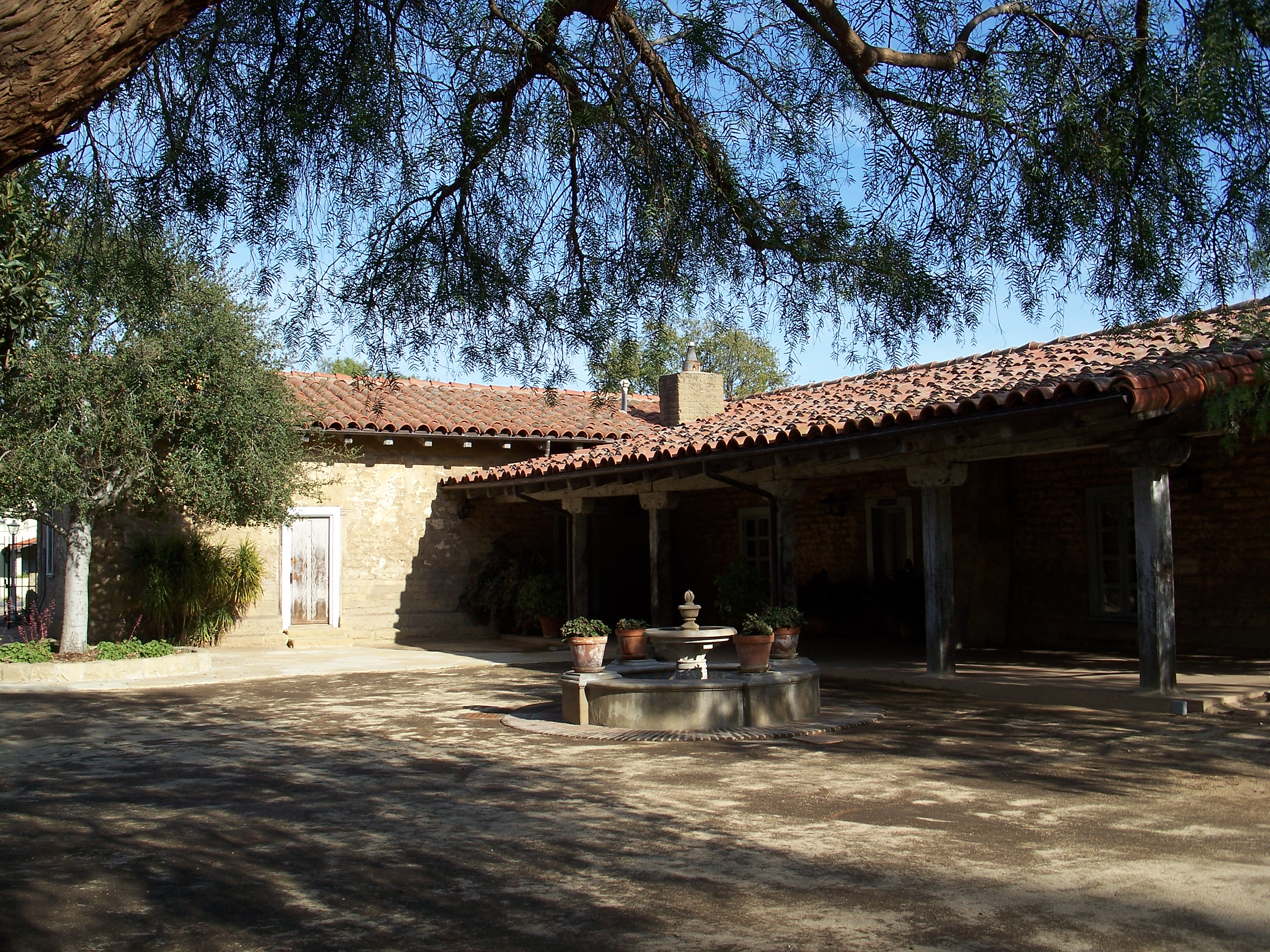
Covarrubias Adobe, the Los Rancheros Visitadores clubhouse

Together with some friends, he organized a group Los Rancheros Visitadores, which held annual California horseback treks, attracting over 700 riders. Mitchell was the first president and led the group for 25 years. Members and guests would include Edward Borein, Thomas M. Storke, Clark Gable, and Walt Disney. In 1938, Los Rancheros acquired the Covarrubias Adobe from historian and author John Southworth for $15,000, and they undertook reconstruction and strengthening of the house in 1940.

In 1979, he was inducted into the Cowboy Hall of Fame in Oklahoma City.

Mitchell lived at Rancho Juan y Lolita until the early 1960s, when he sold it to the actor James Stewart.

== Personal life ==
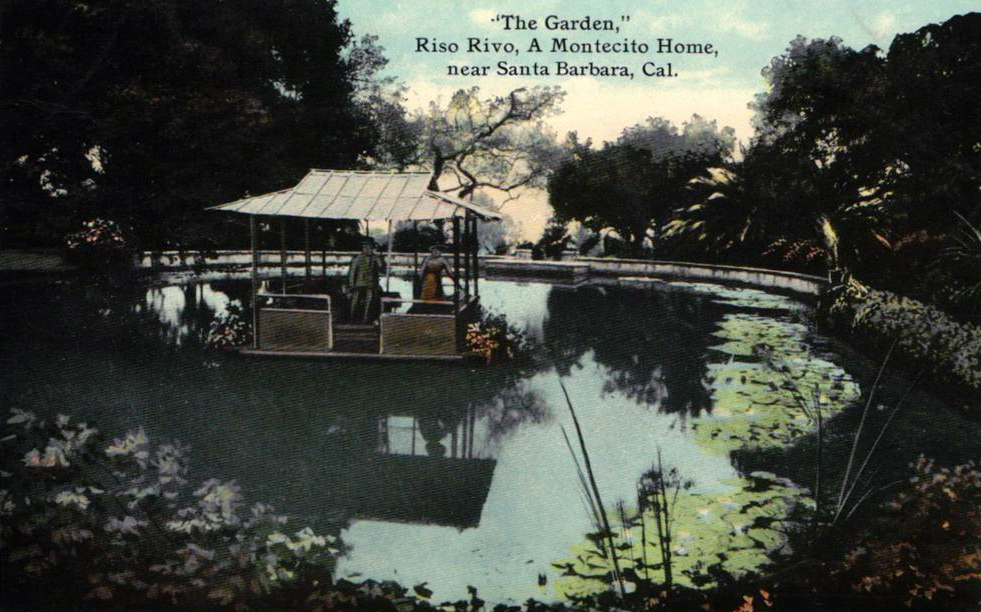
Lotus garden and floating Japanese teahouse at El Mirador, Montecito, California, designed by Charles Frederick Eaton

In 1921, Mitchell married J. Ogden Armour's only child Lolita at the family's estate in the upper-class enclave of Lake Forest, Illinois. Their combined wealth was estimated to be in excess of $120 million (equivalent to $2,182,330,827 in 2025). Armour was then the second-richest man in the US, after John D. Rockefeller.

They lived in a Chicago penthouse, the El Mirador estate in Montecito, a beach house in Montecito, a 12,000-acre (4,900 ha) ranch in the Santa Ynez Valley, and property they owned at Zaca Lake.

In 1916, the Armours started buying land in Montecito including what had been the Charles Frederick Eaton 1887 estate, Riso Rivo, and by 1918, had 70 acres (28 ha) and named the new estate El Mirador. Chicago architect Arthur Heun designed new buildings and landscaped the grounds.

With the help of landscape designer Elmer Awl and 30 gardeners, they redeveloped El Mirador into "one of the most fabulous estates in Montecito", with a formal Italian garden, an underground grotto with stalactites, a dairy, poultry farm, vegetable gardens, avocado and lemon orchards, a small zoo with bears, a wallaby and macaws, a tea pavilion floating on a man-made lake, and an amphitheater seating 1,000 people. The couple divorced in 1941, by which time "financial constraints" had led to reduced upkeep of the estate. Lolita lived at El Mirador up until her death in 1976.

In 1942, Mitchell married Olga Voronseva Varchavshia, a Russian immigrant and interior decorator, and they settled in Santa Barbara.

He had a daughter, Lolita "Tita" M. Lanning of Santa Barbara; and sons John J. Mitchell Jr. of Santa Barbara and James J. Mitchell of Mountain View, California.

Mitchell was living in Montecito at the time of his death on April 7, 1985.
