= Winter Dreams =

1922 short story by F. Scott Fitzgerald

- Short story by F. Scott Fitzgerald
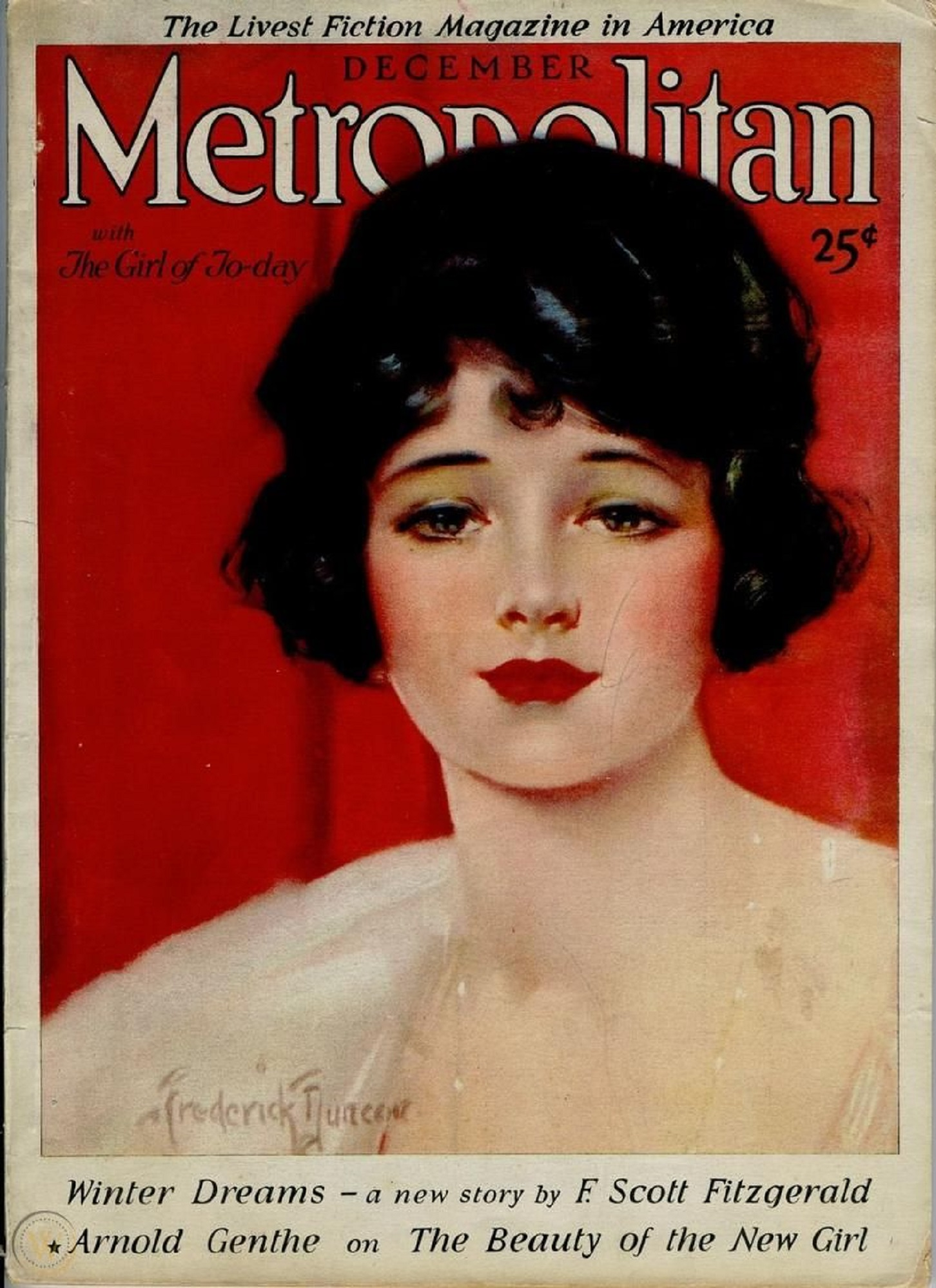
- Metropolitan cover, December 1922

Text available at Wikisource
- Country: United States
- Language: English
- Genre: Short story

Publication
- Published in: Metropolitan magazine All the Sad Young Men
- Publication type: Magazine; Short Story Collection
- Publisher: Scribner (book)
- Media type: Print
- Publication date: December 1922

"Winter Dreams" is a tragic short story by American writer F. Scott Fitzgerald first published in Metropolitan magazine in December 1922 and collected in his 1926 anthology All the Sad Young Men. The plot concerns a young middle-class Midwesterner named Dexter Green who falls in love with the upper-class socialite Judy Jones. His efforts to win her fickle affections ultimately lead to disappointment.

Fitzgerald's unsuccessful courtship of socialite Ginevra King inspired the short story, and King served as his model for the selfish character of Judy Jones. During their courtship, the young writer's middle-class status prompted an intervention by Ginevra's upper-class family, and she rejected him as an unsuitable match. This rejection embittered Fitzgerald's attitude toward the wealthy, and the emotional toll contributed to his incipient alcoholism. Fitzgerald composed the story in September 1922.

Frequently anthologized, critics regard "Winter Dreams" as one of Fitzgerald's finest works for evoking "the loss of youthful illusions." Scholars place the story within the so-called "Gatsby-cluster" of Fitzgerald's canon, noting that he expanded on its themes in his 1925 novel The Great Gatsby. Writing his editor Max Perkins in June 1925, Fitzgerald described the work as a "first draft of the Gatsby idea."

== Plot summary ==
Even the grief he could have borne was left behind in the country of illusion, of youth, of the richness of life, where his winter dreams had flourished.

— F. Scott Fitzgerald, Winter Dreams

A 14-year-old middle-class boy, Dexter Green, works part-time as a caddie at a golf club in Black Bear Lake, Minnesota. Although his father owns the second-most-profitable grocery store in town, Green earns pocket money by caddying for wealthy men such as Mortimer Jones. One day, he meets Mortimer's 11-year-old daughter Judy Jones. Rather than serve as her caddie, he quits his job.

After attending college, Dexter opens a successful laundry business. He returns to the Sherry Island Golf Club and plays golf with the affluent men for whom he once caddied. While golfing, he encounters an older and more beautiful Judy Jones. She carelessly hits her balls in the direction of several young men, striking one of them in the abdomen. They discuss her reputation as an incorrigible flirt.

In the evening on Black Bear Lake, Dexter swims to a raft where he encounters Judy piloting a motor boat. She claims to have just escaped another young man who views her as his romantic ideal. She asks Dexter to teach her how to drive a motor boat, and he drives the boat while she aquaplanes. Judy invites Dexter to dinner. A romance occurs, but he discovers that she entertains other beaus.

While Judy vacations in Florida, Dexter becomes engaged to Irene Scheerer, a kind-hearted but ordinary-looking girl. When Judy returns, she ensnares Dexter's affections once more and asks him to marry her. Dexter breaks off his engagement with Irene, but Judy spurns him once again. Unable to cope with this heartbreak, Dexter joins the American Expeditionary Forces to fight in World War I.

Seven years later, a 32-year-old Dexter has built a successful business career in New York. Now wealthy, he hasn't visited his home in years. One day, a Detroit businessman visits Dexter at his office on a pretext. The man reveals that Judy Jones married one of his friends. He recounts the loss of Judy's beauty and her callous treatment by her husband. This news devastates Dexter as he still loves Judy, and he begins to cry. Dexter realizes that his youthful dreams are gone, and he can never return home.

== Background ==
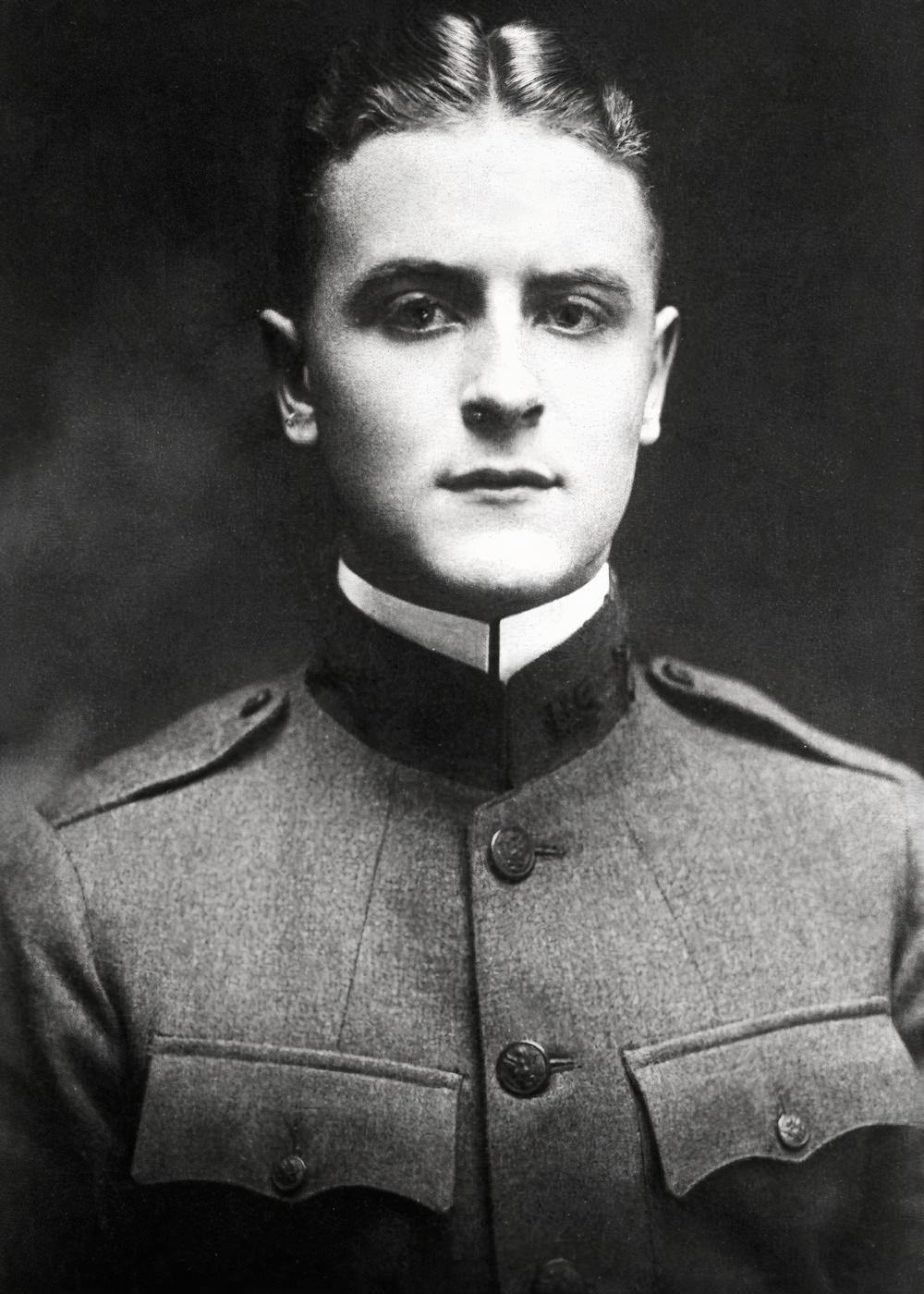
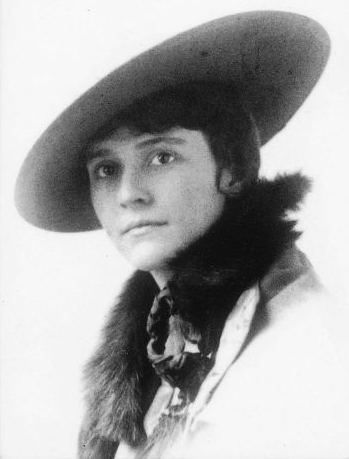
Writer F. Scott Fitzgerald c. 1917 (left) in his army uniform, and socialite Ginevra King c. 1916 (right). King—whom Fitzgerald romantically pursued—inspired the character of Judy Jones.

For the story's plot, Fitzgerald drew upon his unsuccessful romantic pursuit of Ginevra King, a popular Midwestern socialite who served as the model for Judy Jones. A wealthy heiress from a prominent Chicago family, Ginevra enjoyed a privileged upbringing, and the Chicago press chronicled her mundane activities as a member of the elite "Big Four" debutantes during World War I.

While teenagers, Fitzgerald and King met at a sledding party in Saint Paul, Minnesota, and shared a romance from 1915 to 1917, but their relationship ended when Ginevra's family intervened. Either her father, Charles Garfield King, or someone else purportedly humiliated the impressionable young writer and told him that "poor boys shouldn't think of marrying rich girls." Due to his middle-class status and her family's intervention, Ginevra spurned Fitzgerald by January 1917. Fitzgerald claimed that Ginevra rejected him "with the most supreme boredom and indifference."

I've just had rather an unpleasant afternoon. There was a—man I cared about. He told me out of a clear sky that he was poor as a church-mouse. He'd never even hinted it before.... You see, if I'd thought of him as poor—well, I've been mad about loads of poor men, and fully intended to marry them all. But in this case, I hadn't thought of him that way and my interest in him wasn't strong enough to survive the shock.

— Judy Jones, F. Scott Fitzgerald's Winter Dreams

Following his failed pursuit of Ginevra due to his insufficient wealth, Fitzgerald's attitude towards the upper class became embittered. For the remainder of his life, Fitzgerald harbored a smoldering resentment towards the wealthy. He wrote in 1926: "Let me tell you about the very rich. They are different from you and me. They possess and enjoy early, and it does something to them, makes them soft where we are hard, and cynical where we are trustful, in a way that, unless you were born rich, it is very difficult to understand. They think, deep in their hearts, that they are better than we are." In his mind, Ginevra became—much like Daisy Buchanan in The Great Gatsby—one of the "careless people" of the privileged class who "smashed up things … then retreated back into their money."

During his army service and courtship of Zelda Sayre, Fitzgerald continued to write King and begged to resume their relationship. King replied with a letter announcing her arranged marriage to a wealthy polo player. Even after his disappointing marriage to Sayre, the author remained "so smitten by King that... he could not think of her without tears coming to his eyes." The emotional toll of King's rejection contributed to his incipient alcoholism. Fitzgerald wrote the story in September 1922, and Metropolitan paid him $900 for the work (equivalent to $17,311 in 2025).

== Critical analysis ==
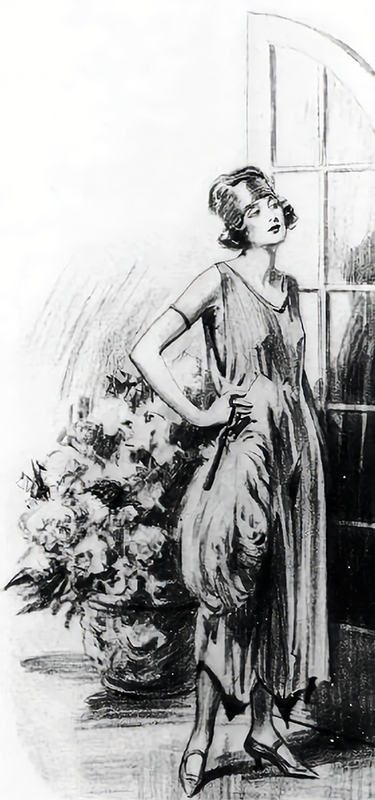
Judy Jones as drawn by illustrator Arthur William Brown in 1922.

As a frequently anthologized short story, critics often praise Fitzgerald's "Winter Dreams" as one of his finest works for its evocation of "the loss of youthful illusions", although Arthur Mizener deemed the work to be inferior to The Rich Boy. In the Fitzgerald canon, scholars categorize "Winter Dreams" as part of the so-called "Gatsby-cluster" that precedes his 1925 novel The Great Gatsby. In correspondence with his editor Max Perkins dated June 1925, Fitzgerald described his story as a "first draft of the Gatsby idea."

Fitzgerald biographer Matthew J. Bruccoli described "Winter Dreams" as "the strongest of the Gatsby-cluster stories." Bruccoli noted the story foreshadows The Great Gatsby's themes and emotions by tracing an ambitious young man's pursuit of a wealthy girl who embodies an elusive dream, and the inevitable loss of the dream due to her fickleness. "Although Dexter Green does not match Jay Gatsby in romantic commitment, he is a preliminary sketch for Gatsby," Bruccoli wrote in his biography, "So close are the reactions of Green and Gatsby to the rich girl's ambiance that the description of Judy's house was lifted from the magazine text of the story and written into The Great Gatsby for Daisy Fay's house."

Scholar Tim Randell argues that "Winter Dreams" ranks as Fitzgerald's greatest literary achievement due to its incisive critique of class relations. He contends that the story traces a young man's alienation from modernity due to a lack of shared meaning and his self-conscious descent into despair and melancholy. Randell asserts that Fitzgerald's story depicts how America's ruling class constructs social meaning and the slow discovery by its protagonist of other possible meanings driven by class antagonism.
