= Edith Cummings =

American socialite and premier amateur golfer (1899–1984)

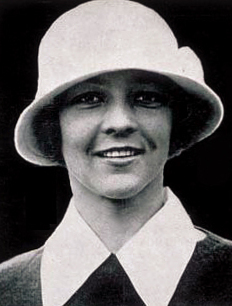
- Cummings in 1924

Personal information
- Full name: Edith Cummings Munson
- Nickname: The Fairway Flapper
- Nationality: United States
- Born: March 26, 1899 Chicago, Illinois, U.S.
- Died: November 20, 1984 (aged 85) Washington, D.C., U.S.
- Spouse: Curtis B. Munson (m. 1934)

Career
- Sport: Golf
- College: Westover School
- Status: Amateur

Achievements and awards
- First female athlete on the cover of Time: 1924

Edith Cummings Munson (March 26, 1899 – November 20, 1984), popularly known as The Fairway Flapper, was an American socialite and one of the premier amateur golfers during the Jazz Age. She was one of the Big Four debutantes in Chicago during World War I. She attained fame in the United States following her 1923 victory in the U.S. Women's Amateur. On August 25, 1924, she became the first golfer and first female athlete to appear on the cover of Time magazine. (Note: Cummings was only the fourth woman to appear on the cover of Time, after Eleanora Duse (July 30, 1923), and in 1924, Lou Henry Hoover (April 21) and Queen Marie of Romania (August 4)) She also was the literary model for the character of Jordan Baker in F. Scott Fitzgerald's novel The Great Gatsby.

== Early life and school ==
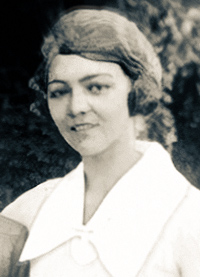
Cummings circa 1920

Cummings was born on March 26, 1899, to David Mark Cummings and his wife Ruth Dexter. She had a younger brother, Dexter, and a younger sister Dorothy who died in infancy in December 1902.

Cummings had a privileged upbringing and was regarded by the Chicago press as a member of the city's elite "Big Four" debutantes circa World War I. This exclusive quartet consisted of Cummings, Ginevra King, Courtney Letts, and Margaret Carry. The four debutantes often "went to dances and house parties together, and they were seen as a foursome on the golf links and tennis courts at Onwentsia."

Edith's father, David Cummings, was a Yale alumnus and Chicago banker. He paid for her to attend the Westover School, a prestigious finishing school in Middlebury, Connecticut. Edith was in the class of 1917. Though the school had been founded only in 1909 by headmistress Mary Robbins Hillard, the institution attracted young women from many prominent families. Cummings' classmates included fellow Chicago socialite Ginevra King, future philanthropist Katharine Ordway, Isabel Rockefeller (of the Rockefeller family, a granddaughter of William Rockefeller), and Prescott Bush's sisters Mary and Margaret (aunts to U.S. President George H. W. Bush and great aunts to George W. Bush).

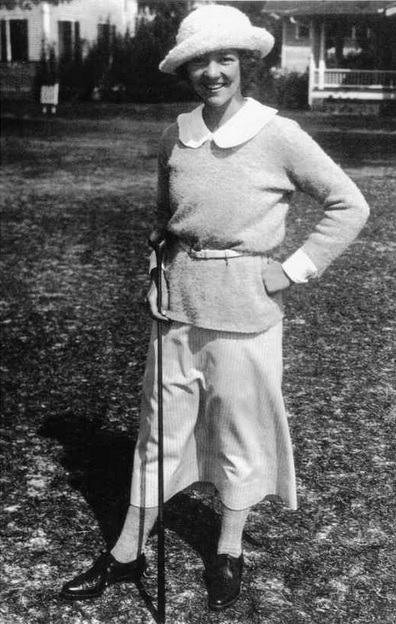
Cummings in 1924

== F. Scott Fitzgerald ==
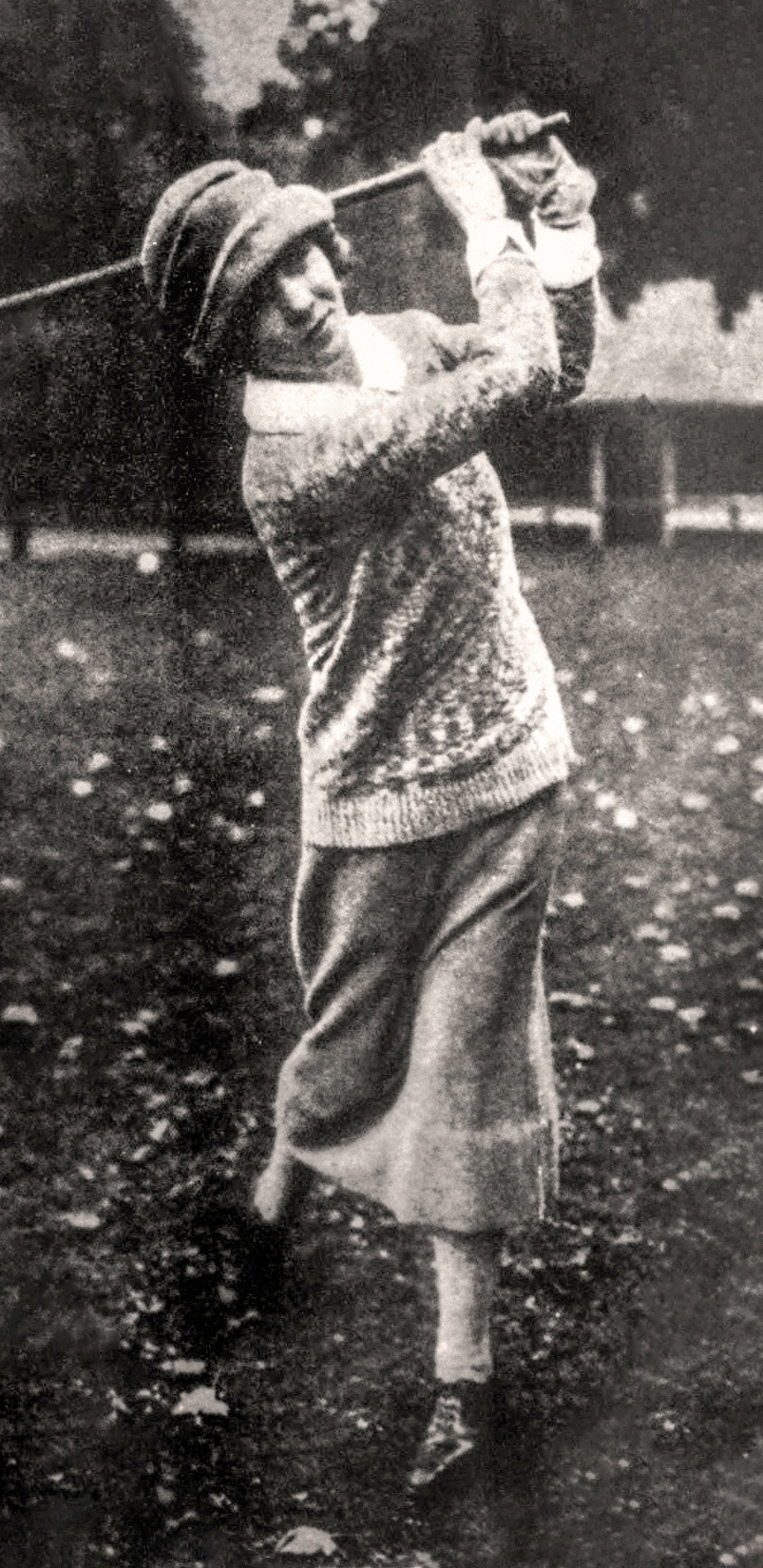
Cummings in 1923

In 1915, while either at Westover School in Connecticut or at Lake Forest, Illinois, Cummings met a young Princeton University student named F. Scott Fitzgerald. He had fallen in love with her close friend and Westover schoolmate Ginevra King. He would later immortalize both of them in his 1925 novel The Great Gatsby. Fitzgerald based the character of Jordan Baker in The Great Gatsby upon Cummings, just as the character Daisy Buchanan was modeled after Cummings' friend King.

Much like King and Cummings, Buchanan and Baker were wealthy socialites and intimate friends. Baker, à la Cummings, "wore all her dresses like sports clothes — there was a jauntiness about her movements as if she had first learned to walk upon golf courses on clean, crisp mornings." In the novel, Baker is the love interest of the novel's narrator Nick Carraway, and she purportedly cheats at golf, but there is no evidence that Fitzgerald drew this particular detail from Cummings. Fitzgerald reportedly created the name of Cummings' character by combining the names of two car manufacturers, the Jordan Motor Car Company and the Baker Motor Vehicle.

== Golf victories ==
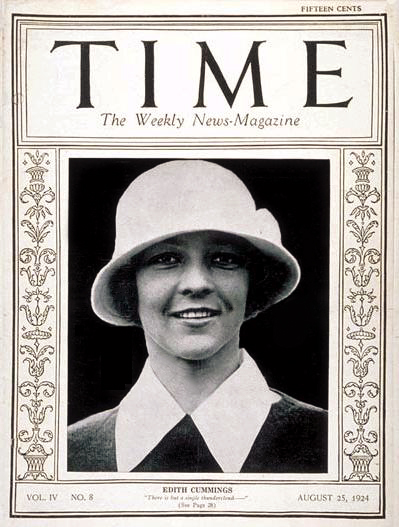
Cummings on the cover of Time magazine in August 1924

Following her graduation from Westover School in 1917, Cummings pursued tournament golf where she garnered the sobriquet of "the Fairway Flapper." In 1919, she qualified to compete in the U.S. Women's Amateur for the first time. Cummings and her brother Dexter had learned to play golf from their parents at the Onwentsia Club in Lake Forest, Illinois. Both her father and mother had been club champions. Edith had won the club championship in 1918. Her sibling Dexter won the intercollegiate championship in 1923 and in 1924 and the Western Amateur championship in 1925.

In 1921, Cummings competed in the British Ladies Amateur with other famous female golfers such as Alexa Stirling and Marion Hollins. The next year, Cummings entered the U.S. Women's Amateur, where she was in match play against Glenna Collett, then an 18-year-old from Rhode Island, who became known as one of the great female golfers of the 1920s. Cummings lost on the final hole. She won the U.S. Women's Amateur in 1923, earning her the cover photo on Time as well as profiles in Vogue, Ladies' Home Journal, and many newspapers. She also won the Women's Western Amateur in 1924.

== Marriage ==
Cummings never won another tournament and left tournament golf in 1926, but remained a well-known figure. In 1934, she married wealthy Detroit businessman Curtis B. Munson who had accrued a considerable fortune in coal and lumber interests.

During their marriage, Curtis Munson served as a clandestine U.S. intelligence operative engaging in espionage activities against the Japanese Empire under the direction of Assistant Secretary of State Adolph Berle.

In 1940, at the behest of President Franklin D. Roosevelt, Munson investigated the sympathies of Japanese-Americans living in the United States before the U.S. entered World War II and authored the Munson Report. In his report, Munson was highly critical of accusations that Japanese-American citizens would serve as fifth column saboteurs, and he concluded that the average Japanese-American was "an extremely good citizen and it is only because he is a stranger to us that we mistrust him."

== Later life and legacy ==
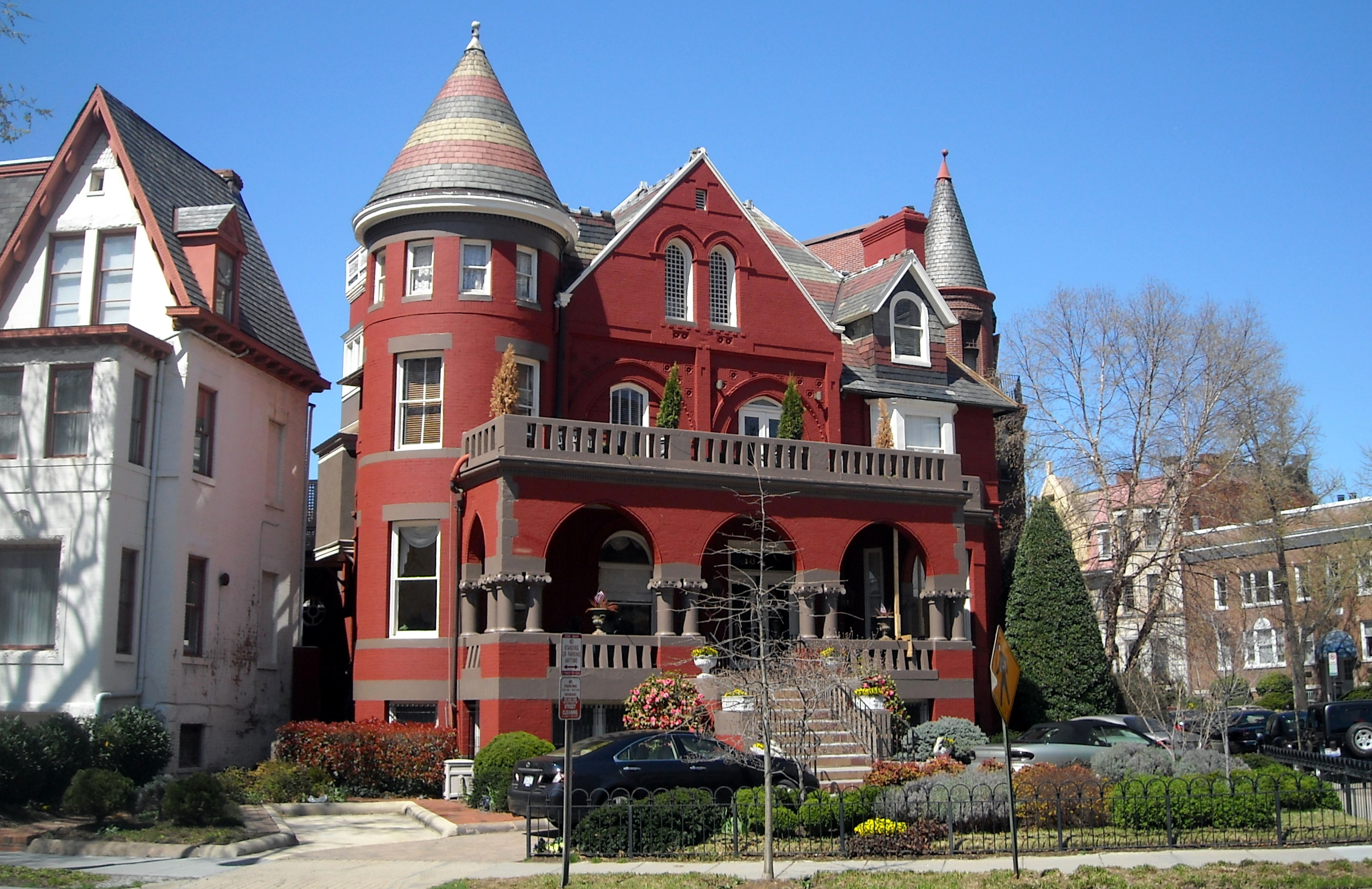
Cummings' former house in the Dupont Circle neighborhood of Washington, D.C.

Graves of Curtis and Edith Cummings Munson at Graceland Cemetery

Cummings and Munson largely retreated from the public spotlight later in life except for forays into philanthropy. Cummings remained a committed golfer into her 80s. She was enthusiastic about all outdoor activities, especially big game hunting in the Yukon and fishing. She and her husband traveled extensively throughout their marriage until her husband's death in 1979. In his honor, she made a significant contribution to the Decatur House renovation in Washington, D.C.

Edith died in Washington on November 20, 1984. She and Curtis are buried at Graceland Cemetery in Chicago.

Today, the Curtis and Edith Munson Foundation funds a number of conservation programs. She has an award named after her, the Edith Cummings Munson Golf Award, given annually to one of the top female collegiate golfers who excels in academics. The Curtis and Edith Munson Foundation donates $5,000 to the general scholarship fund of the winner's school.

== See also ==
- Ginevra King, a debutante friend of Cummings and also the inspiration for a F. Scott Fitzgerald character
- Big Four, a quartet of wealthy Chicago debutantes who were famous circa World War I

== Notes ==
Awards and achievements
Preceded by Ramsay MacDonald	Cover of Time Magazine; August 25, 1924	Succeeded by Adolph Ochs
