= CIVC Partners =

Chicago-based private equity firm

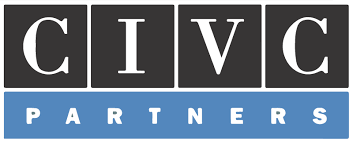
- Company type: Private Ownership
- Industry: Private Equity
- Founded: 1970; 56 years ago
- Headquarters: Chicago, Illinois, United States
- Products: Private equity funds
- Total assets: $1.8 billion
- Website: www.civc.com

CIVC Partners, previously known as Continental Illinois Venture Corporation, is a Chicago-based private equity firm.

CIVC Partners provides growth and buyout capital to middle-market companies engaged in business services, utility and infrastructure services, facility services, transportation & logistics, outsourced services, environmental services, IT services, software & tech-enabled services, insurance services, compliance and risk management, digital marketing services and financial technology.

== History ==
The firm's predecessor was established in 1970 as a subsidiary of Continental Illinois National Bank and Trust Company. When Continental Illinois was acquired in 1994 by Bank of America, the CIVC team formed a semi-independent private equity firm, CIVC Partners, with backing from Bank of America. Today, CIVC is an independent middle-market private equity firm with a diverse group of L.P. investors, and recently raised its seventh fund.

CIVC's major investments from the past and present include: Crest Insurance Group, a leading insurance brokerage; Magna Legal Services, a legal support services firm; KPA, an EHS compliance management software company; The Brickman Group, a commercial landscaping company; Thermo Fluids, an environmental services company; Stoneridge Insurance Brokers, an insurance brokerage and managing general agent; EN Engineering, a utility/power/energy focused engineering company; PowerTeam Services, a provider of infrastructure services to the gas and electric utility industry; Ground Penetrating Radar Systems (GPRS), a nationwide provider of private utility locating and concrete scanning services; LA Fitness, a leading operating of full service fitness clubs throughout the US; and Wintrust Financial Corporation, a regional bank holding company.

CIVC Partners acquired Colorado-based database and analytics service provider in January 2024.
