= Westover School =

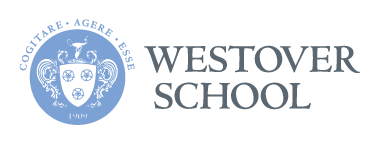

Location
- 1237 Whittemore Road; Middlebury, Connecticut 06762; United States; 41°31′36″N 73°07′24″W

Information
- School type: Boarding and day
- Motto: Cogitare Agere Esse (To think, to do, to be)
- Founded: 1909 (117 years ago)
- Founders: Mary Robbins Hillard
- CEEB code: 070395
- Head of school: Polly Oppmann Fredlund
- Grades: 9–12
- Average class size: 12
- Student to teacher ratio: 1:4
- Campus size: 146 acres (59 hectares)
- Athletics conference: New England Preparatory School Athletic Council
- Sports: Soccer, volleyball, cross country, basketball, squash, rock climbing, swimming, rowing, and softball
- Mascot: Wildcat
- Teams: Wests and Overs
- Yearbook: Coagess
- Website: www.westoverschool.org

Westover School, often referred to simply as "Westover", is an independent college-preparatory day and boarding school for girls. Located in Middlebury, Connecticut, United States, the school offers grades 9 through 12.

== Early history ==
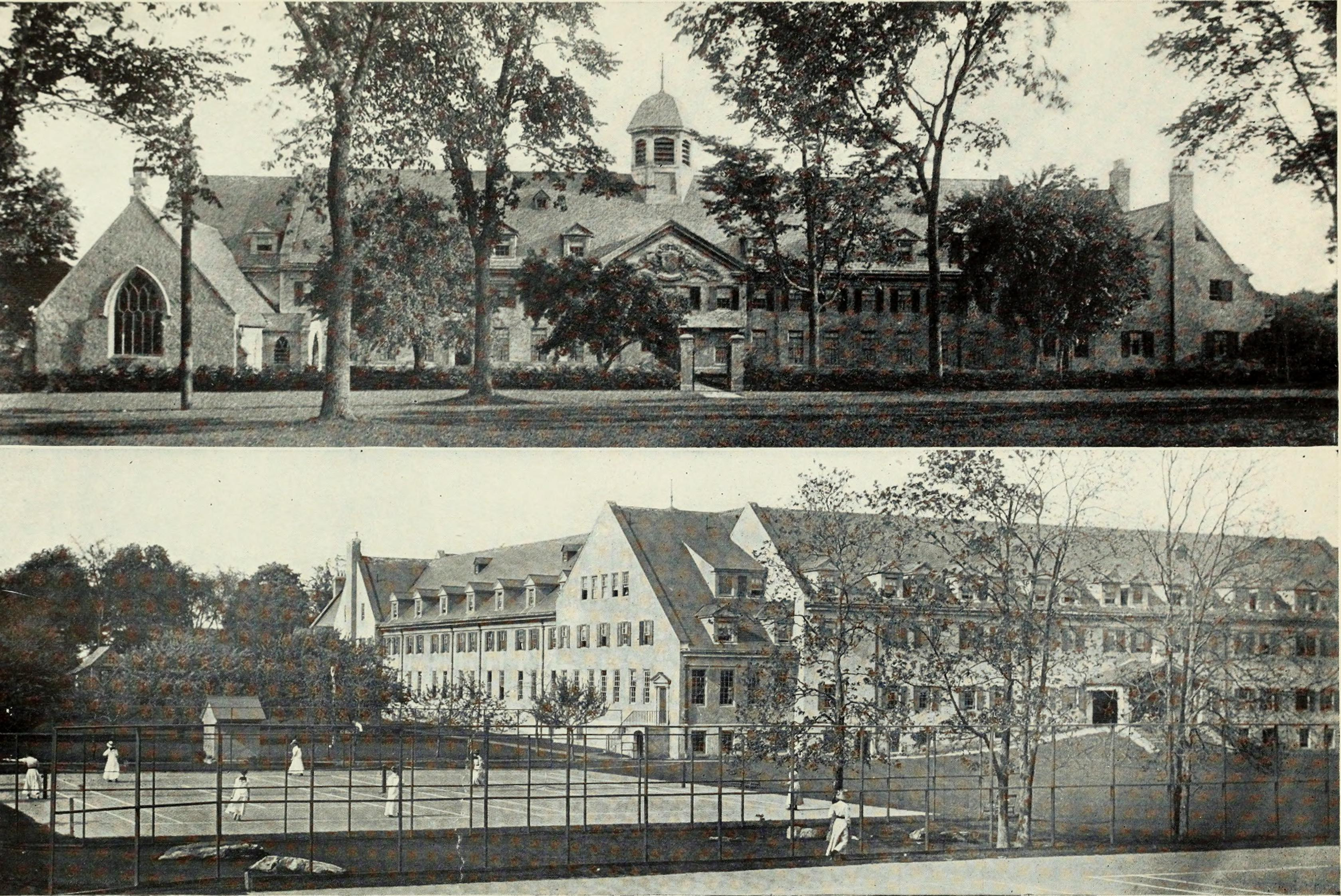
Historical images of Westover School

=== Mary Hillard and the founding of Westover ===
Westover School was founded in 1909 by Mary Robbins Hillard "to provide young women with a liberal education in a community which would contribute to the development of their character, independence and sense of responsibility." The Main Building and campus were designed by Theodate Pope Riddle.

The daughter of a clergyman, Hillard was educated at the Collegiate School for Young Ladies in Waterbury, Connecticut; and at Abbot Academy in Andover, Massachusetts. She taught at Miss Porter's School in Farmington, Connecticut, for six years, where she met her lifelong friend, Theodate Pope Riddle. She became Assistant Headmistress of the Collegiate School, and then Headmistress when it became St. Margaret's.

Because of Hillard's growing feeling that St. Margaret's was becoming increasingly hemmed in by the growth of Waterbury, she and her friend Theodate began to plan a new school, west and over the hills from St. Margaret's. The St. Margaret's trustees subscribed to the project, and work was begun in 1908. A great square building surrounding an open quadrangle was built in place of an old apple orchard. The first class of students, including all former boarders at St. Margaret's, arrived at the school in 1909. A number of the leading families in the area maintained their interest in Westover through the years.

"The School Estate consists of homestead, meadow, and woodland. In the general character of the building, the endeavor has been to combine appropriateness with beauty, so that the charm and dignity of the academic and domestic atmosphere shall be an unconscious but elevating influence endearing the place to all coming under its associations." – from Westover's first catalogue

Hillard created many of the ongoing Westover traditions: The West and Over teams, the apple trees in the Quadrangle, the Germans, the Lantern as the School’s symbol, the Lantern Ceremony, Dorcas, and other elements which have been woven into the fabric of Westover life over the years.

“Be quiet and let your spirit fill the buildings." – Theodate Pope Riddle to Mary Robbins Hillard

== Notable alumnae ==
- Margaret Bush Clement
- Edith Cummings
- Miriam DeCosta-Willis
- Ginevra King
- Babe Paley
- Donnan Plumb, Olympic equestrian
- Edith Gwynne Read
- Isabel Rockefeller
- Alice Tully
- Princess Zein bint Hussein
