= The Pursuit of Persephone =

Adapted from This side of Paradise

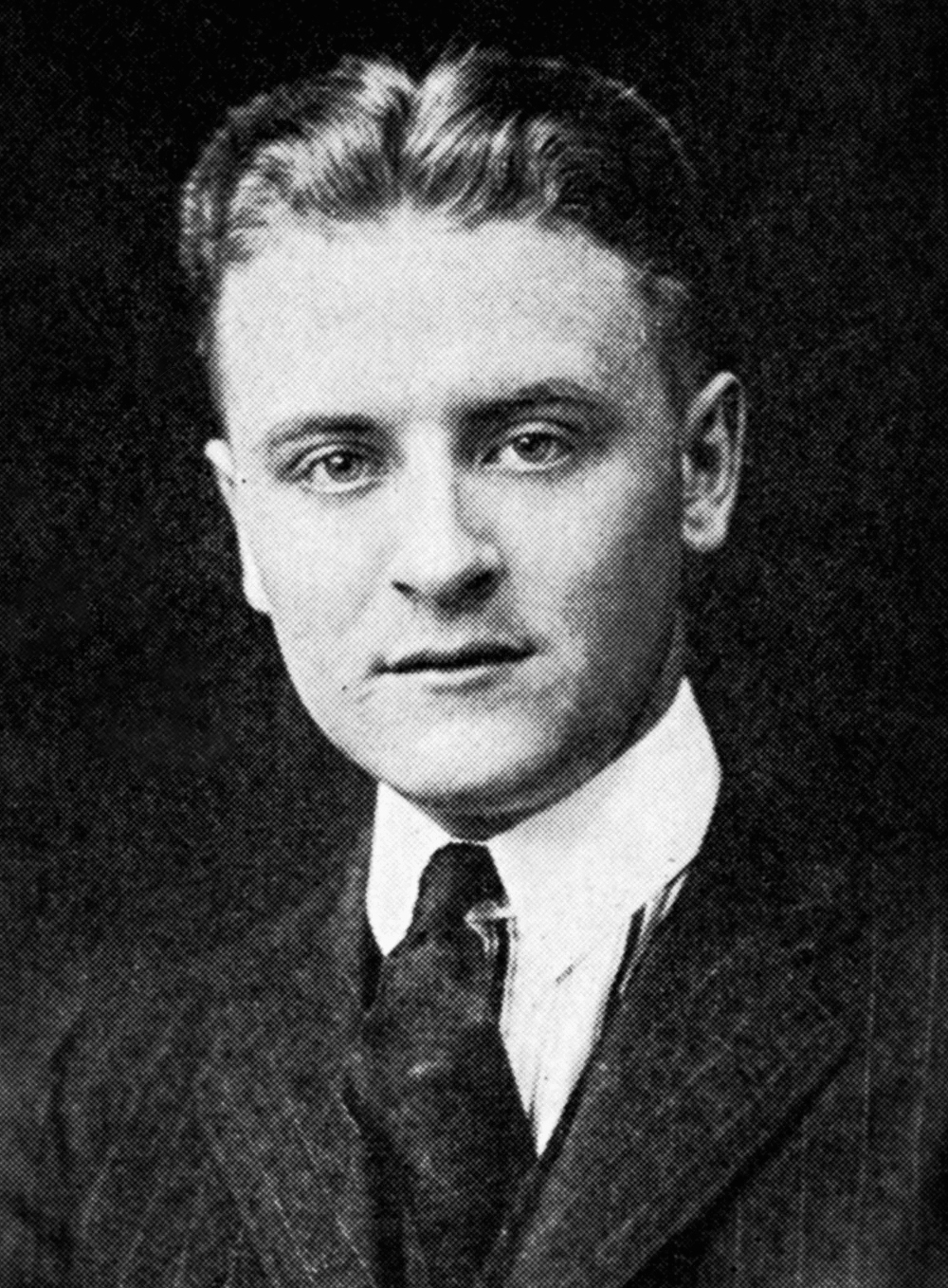
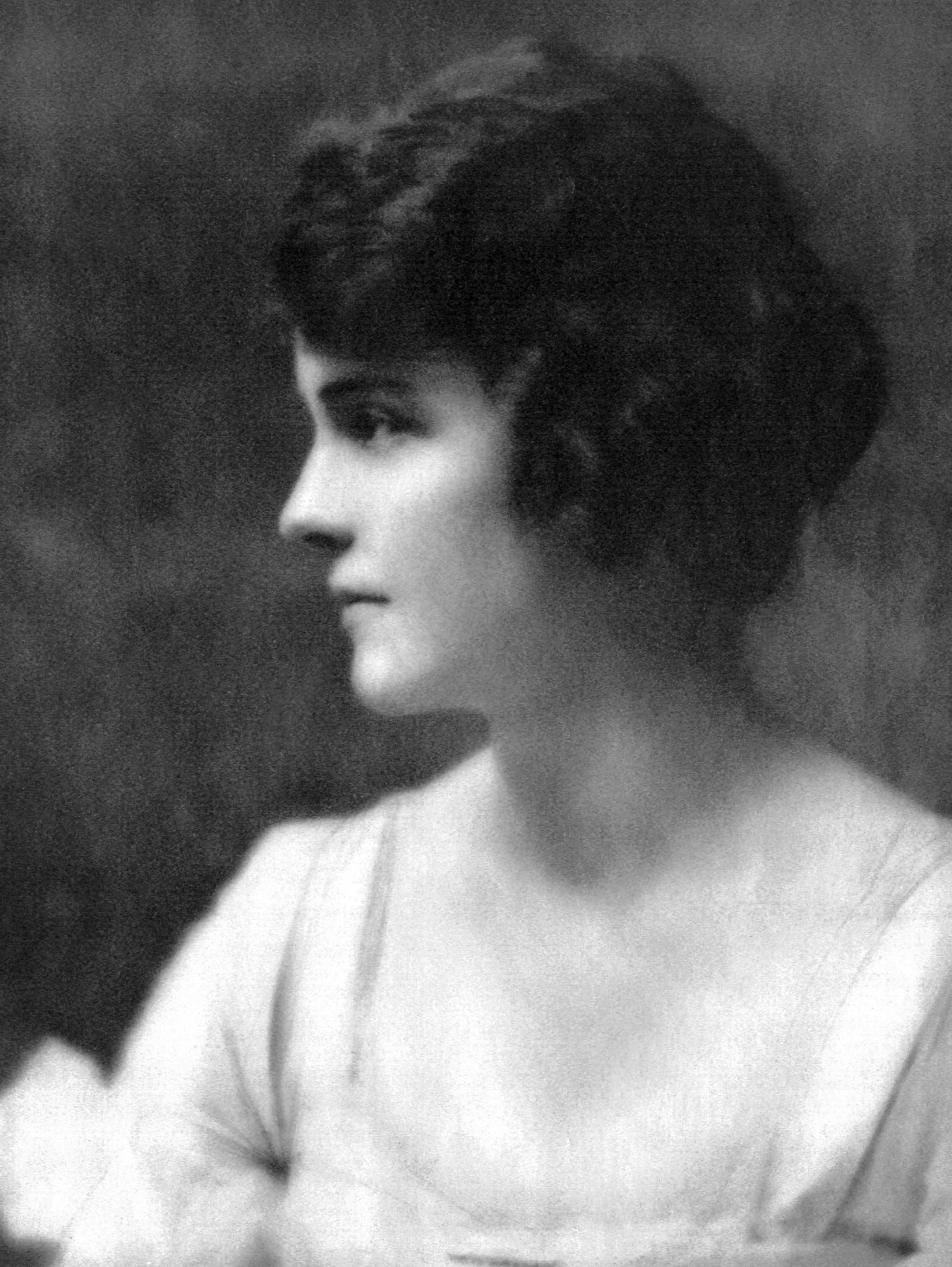
F. Scott Fitzgerald circa 1917 and Chicago socialite Ginevra King circa 1918

The Pursuit of Persephone is a musical with music and lyrics by Peter Mills and book by Cara Reichel. The show details F. Scott Fitzgerald's time at Princeton University, and his love for Ginevra King. Elements of the plot are loosely adapted from This Side of Paradise (Fitzgerald's own fictionalized account of his time at Princeton).

== Productions ==
The show premiered at the Connelly Theatre in New York City in 2005, featuring Chris Fuller as F. Scott Fitzgerald and Jessica Grové as Ginevra King.

In 2006 much of the original cast returned for a concert reading of the show at the Lucille Lortel Theatre. That same year, a production of the show was staged at the University of Michigan, starring Justin Paul as F. Scott Fitzgerald.

In 2014 the show was reworked and presented by the Prospect Theater Company under the name "The Underclassman".

== Cast ==
	2005 Off-Broadway	2006 Concert Reading	2014 Prospect Theater
F. Scott Fitzgerald	Chris Fuller		Matt Dengler
Ginevra King	Jessica Grové		
Marie Hersey	Piper Goodeve		
Edmund Wilson	David Abeles		
John Peale Bishop	Benjamin Sands		Marrick Smith
Trip Everett			Jordan Bondurant
"Ham" Samuels			Jeremy Morse
Clive Bagby			Jason Edward Cook

== Reception ==
The show received some praise for its music, costuming, and casting, but often received criticism for its book.

The 2014 production similarly was praised for its music, while critics felt the underlying story was not interesting enough to captivate audiences.

== Awards ==
Award	Category	
2006 Drama Desk Awards	Best Music	Nominated
2006 Drama Desk Awards	Best Orchestrations	Nominated
