= Big Four (debutantes) =

Quartet of Chicago socialites

The Big Four were a quartet of debutantes in the Chicago social scene during World War I who viewed themselves as "the four most attractive and socially desirable young women in Chicago." The quartet consisted of Ginevra King, Edith Cummings, Courtney Letts, and Margaret Carry. The Big Four—a name they coined and bestowed upon themselves—were the preeminent socialites of their era, and each wore a rose-gold pinkie ring with phrase, "The Big Four 1914," engraved on the inner band.

== Background ==
Each of the Big Four was born around the turn of the century and came from a wealthy family in the Chicago area. Raised in luxury on their family's sprawling estates in Lake Forest, the quartet enjoyed carefree lives consisting of polo, tennis, country-club flirtations and private-school feuds. Due to the immense wealth of their respective families, the Chicago press chronicled their mundane social activities, and newspaper columnists feted the young women as the city's most desirable debutantes.

In the summer of 1914, these friends began referring to themselves as "The Big Four", even getting rings engraved with "The Big Four 1914". They went to dances and house parties together, and they were seen as a foursome on the golf links and tennis courts at Onwentsia. They were "so legendary for their beauty that they were known by that designation for the rest of their lives."

== Members ==
=== Ginevra King ===
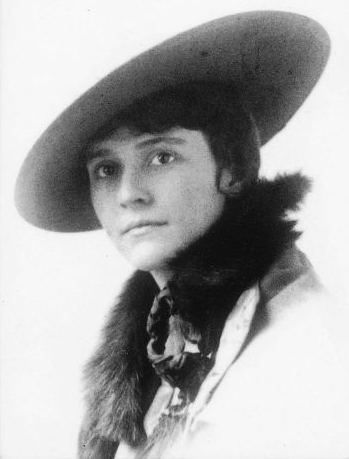
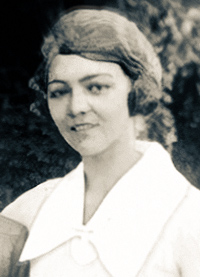
Ginevra King (left) inspired the character of Daisy Buchanan in F. Scott Fitzgerald's The Great Gatsby. Edith Cummings (right) was an amateur golfer who inspired the character of Jordan Baker.

Ginevra King (November 30, 1898 – December 13, 1980), daughter of Chicago financier Charles King, is best known for her romantic relationship with, and being a muse for, F. Scott Fitzgerald. She was the inspiration for the character of Daisy Buchanan in The Great Gatsby. King married twice, to William Mitchell and John T. Pirie Jr.

=== Edith Cummings ===
Edith Cummings (March 26, 1899 – November 20, 1984) was one of the premier golfers of her generation. In 1923, she won the U.S. Women's Amateur, and she appeared on the August 25, 1924, cover of Time magazine. She was also a big game hunter and equestrienne. In 1934, she married Curtis Burton Munson.

Cummings met F. Scott Fitzgerald through King, and was the inspiration for the character of Jordan Baker in The Great Gatsby.

=== Courtney Letts ===
Courtney Louise Letts (June 17, 1899 – April 7, 1995), born in Iowa, was the daughter of Frank Crawford Letts and Cora Perkins. She married Wellesley H. Stillwell on January 10, 1920. They divorced in 1924, and in 1925, she married John Borden, with whom she traveled to the Arctic; this provided the material for her 1928 book The Cruise of the Northern Light. They divorced in 1933 and three weeks later, she married Argentine ambassador Felipe de Espil, who had courted her in the early 1920s.

While married to Espil, she became "one of the world's ten best-dressed women, and an able diplomat herself." In 1943, they moved back to Buenos Aires, and then in 1945 to Madrid when Felipe was appointed Argentina's ambassador to Spain. In 1955, he became ambassador to Brazil, and then around 1959, he and Courtney retired to Buenos Aires. Felipe died in 1972. After moving to New York, she married Foster Adams in 1974. She died April 7, 1995, in Washington, D.C.

Works by Letts:

- The Cruise of the Northern Light - New York: Macmillan Co. 1928. (Mechanicsburg, PA: Stackpole Books. 2004. ISBN 0-8117-3140-5)
- Adventures in a Man's World - New York: Macmillan Co. 1933. (Mechanicsburg, PA: Stackpole Books. 2005. ISBN 0-8117-3205-3)
- La Esposa del Embajador - Buenos Aires: Editorial Jorge Alvarez S.A. 1967. (Spanish)
- Noticias Confidenciales de Buenos Aires a USA (1869-1892) - Buenos Aires: Editorial Jorge Alvarez S.A. 1969. (Spanish)

=== Margaret Carry ===
Margaret "Peg" Carry (December 14, 1899 – June 14, 1942) was the daughter of Edward F. Carry, one-time president of the Pullman Company and assistant to Edward Nash Hurley, chairman of the Shipping Board, during World War I. She is mentioned by F. Scott Fitzgerald in his Ledger from August 1916: "Lake Forest. Peg Carry. Petting party ... The dinner at Peg's ... Peg Carry stands straight".

She married Edward Cudahy Jr. on December 28, 1919, in Chicago's Holy Name Cathedral. She died in 1942.
