= J. Ogden Armour =

American businessman (1863–1927)

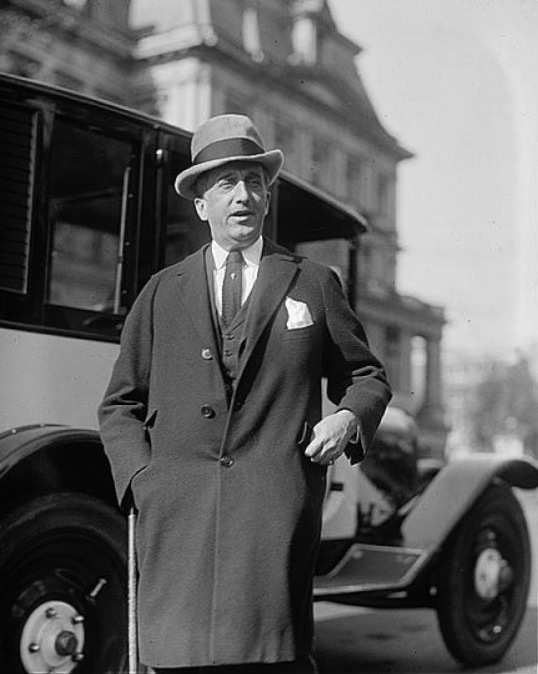
- Armour in 1922
- Born: November 11, 1863; Milwaukee, Wisconsin, U.S.
- Died: August 16, 1927 (aged 63); London, England, U.K.
- Education: Yale University
- Occupation: Businessman
- Spouse: Lola Sheldon Armour (m.1892)
- Children: 1
- Parent(s): Philip Danforth Armour; Malvina Belle Ogden
- Relatives: Herman Ossian Armour (uncle); Jack Mitchell (son-in-law); Alice de Janzé (first cousin once removed)

Jonathan Ogden Armour (November 11, 1863 – August 16, 1927) was an American meatpacking magnate and only surviving son of Civil War–era industrialist Philip Danforth Armour. He became owner and president of Armour & Company upon the death of his father in 1901. During his tenure as president, Armour and Co. expanded nationwide and overseas, growing from a mid-sized regional meatpacker to the largest food products company in the United States.

== Biography ==
Armour was born on November 11, 1863, in Milwaukee, Wisconsin to Philip Danforth Armour, Sr. and Malvina Belle (Ogden) Armour. He was the couple's first child; a brother, Philip Danforth Armour, Jr., followed. The year he was born, his father became a partner in the meatpacking firm of Plankinton & Armour. The family moved to Chicago in 1865. In 1867, Armour's father decided to move the company's primary meatpacking operations from Milwaukee to Chicago. His business partner disagreed, and sold his interest in the company to the senior Armour. The firm moved, and changed its name to Armour & Co.

Armour attended Yale University, but dropped out during his senior year in order to assist his father with the family company. He became a partner in the firm in 1884.

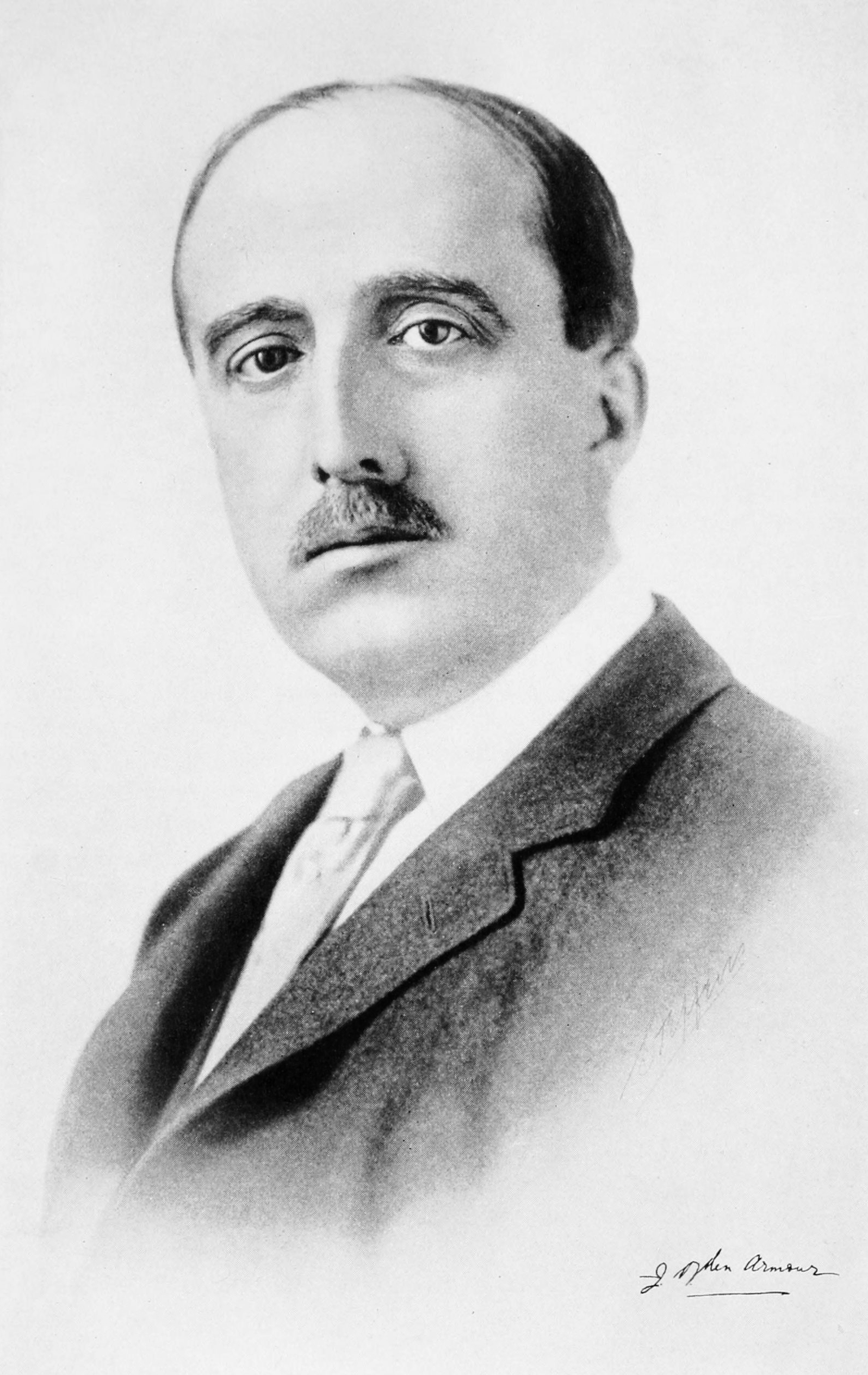
Armour in 1917

He met Lola Hughes Sheldon in 1891. They married in Mexico in 1892, and had one daughter, Lolita Ogden (Armour) Higgason (1896–1976).

As his father's health declined, he took over more and more responsibility for the direction of Armour & Co. His younger brother, Philip, Jr., died in 1900. J. Ogden Armour took over as company president in 1901. During his tenure, sales increased from $200 million to $1 billion.

In July 1904, the Amalgamated Meat Cutters struck all meatpackers in Chicago. Armour and the other employers broke the union by hiring thousands of unemployed African American strikebreakers. The hiring of the strikebreakers provoked a riot involving 4,000 union members and their families on August 19, 1904. The strike collapsed in mid-September. Social reformer Jane Addams met personally with Armour to secure a contract which helped the union survive.

Armour completed construction in 1908 on an Italian-style estate on 1,200 acres (1.85 mi^{2}) in Lake Forest, Illinois. He called it "Mellody Farms." The estate was designed for his daughter, who was crippled as a child. The grounds contained ponds stocked with fish, a large herd of deer, stables, an orangerie, and its own power plant. The mansion itself contained a bowling alley, twenty marble fireplaces, a green panelled room purchased by Mrs. Armour in London, and a direct line to the Chicago Stock Yards. The historian of Lake Forest Edward Arpee called it "the most pretentious" of all of the colossal housing appearing in the town at the time.

In 1911, Armour and nine other meatpackers were sued by the federal government for violations of the Sherman Anti-Trust Act. Armour convinced the other owners to let the case go to the jury without offering a defense; Armour and the other meatpackers were acquitted.

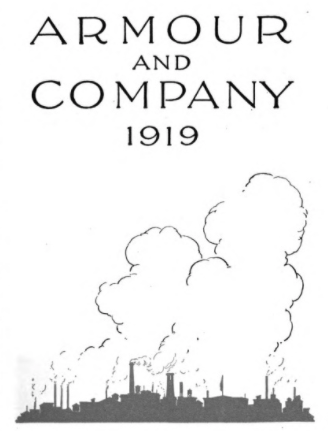
Cover of Armour and Company, 1919

To finance the company's growth during World War I, Armour sold $60 million in bonds to the public in 1917. These bonds were converted to stock in 1919, making Armour & Co. one of the first publicly traded meatpacking firms. Thanks to his fortune in meat and interests in the railways, Armour was known as "the second richest man in the world".

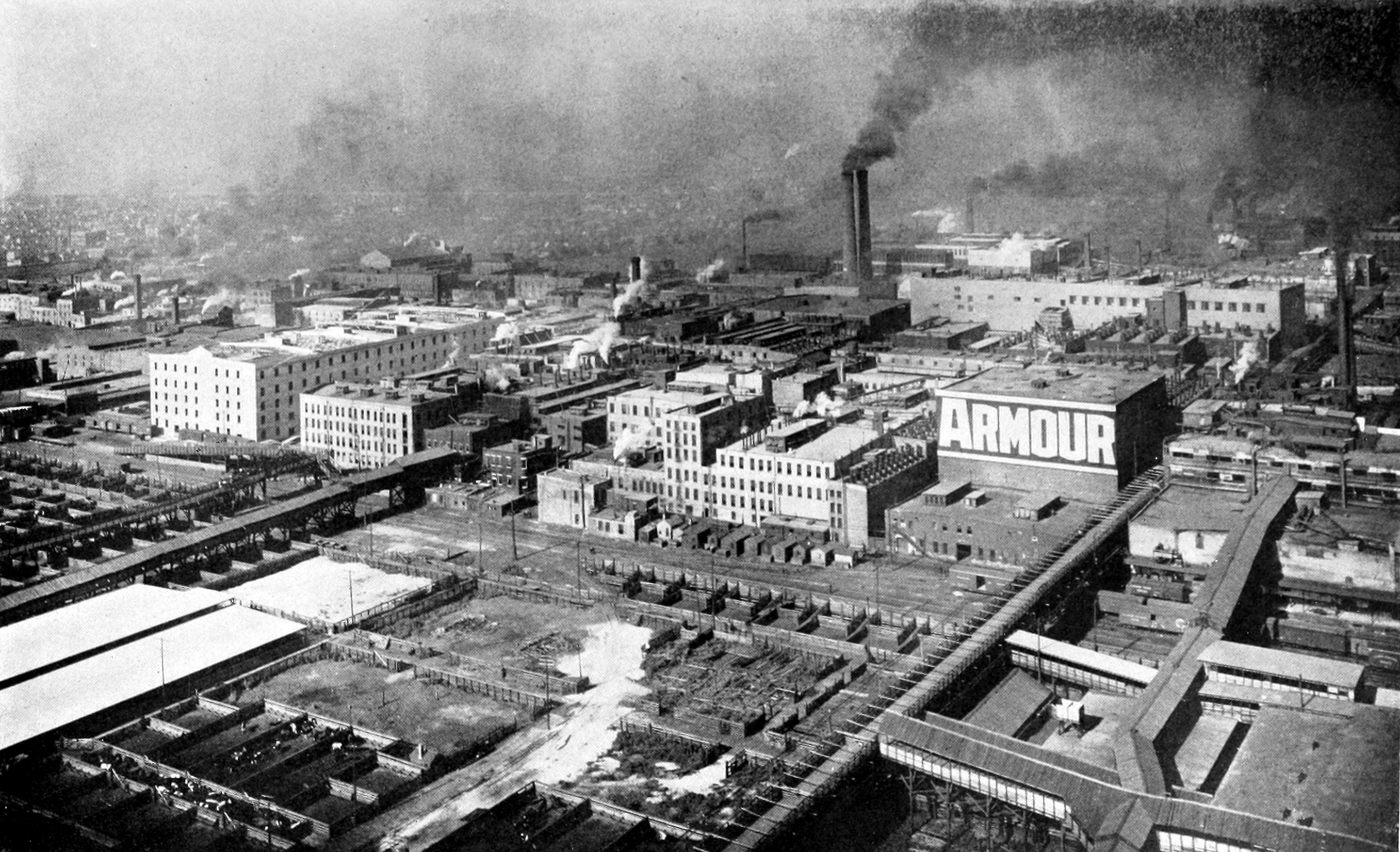
Armour and Co. stock yards, Chicago

The company lost $125 million between 1919 and 1921. In the post-war slump, Armour & Co. sales collapsed and the company went $144 million in debt. Armour suffered the most when he lost most of his family fortune—at $100 million in stock (about $1.47 billion in 2010 dollars; then the second-largest in the world) in the downturn. During the worst period, Armour lost a million dollars a day for 130 days.

Armour's daughter Lolita married Chicago banker JJ Mitchell in 1921 at the family's estate in Lake Forest.

Armour was unable to reinvigorate the company, and was ousted as president in 1923. His successor was F. Edson White.

Amidst Armour's profound financial losses, he lost Mellody Farms, which is now part of the campus of Lake Forest Academy.

== Death ==
In the summer of 1927, Amour traveled to London, England, and fell ill with typhoid and then pneumonia. As his condition worsened, he was attended by Lord Dawson of Penn, personal physician to King George V. Armour died of heart failure at 4:30 p.m. London time on August 16, 1927.

He had less than $25,000 in cash in his accounts, although his stock holdings in the Universal Oil Products Company were estimated at $3 million (about $37 million in 2010 dollars). Years later this "worthless Stock" became valuable and made his widow wealthy. He was buried in Chicago's Graceland Cemetery.

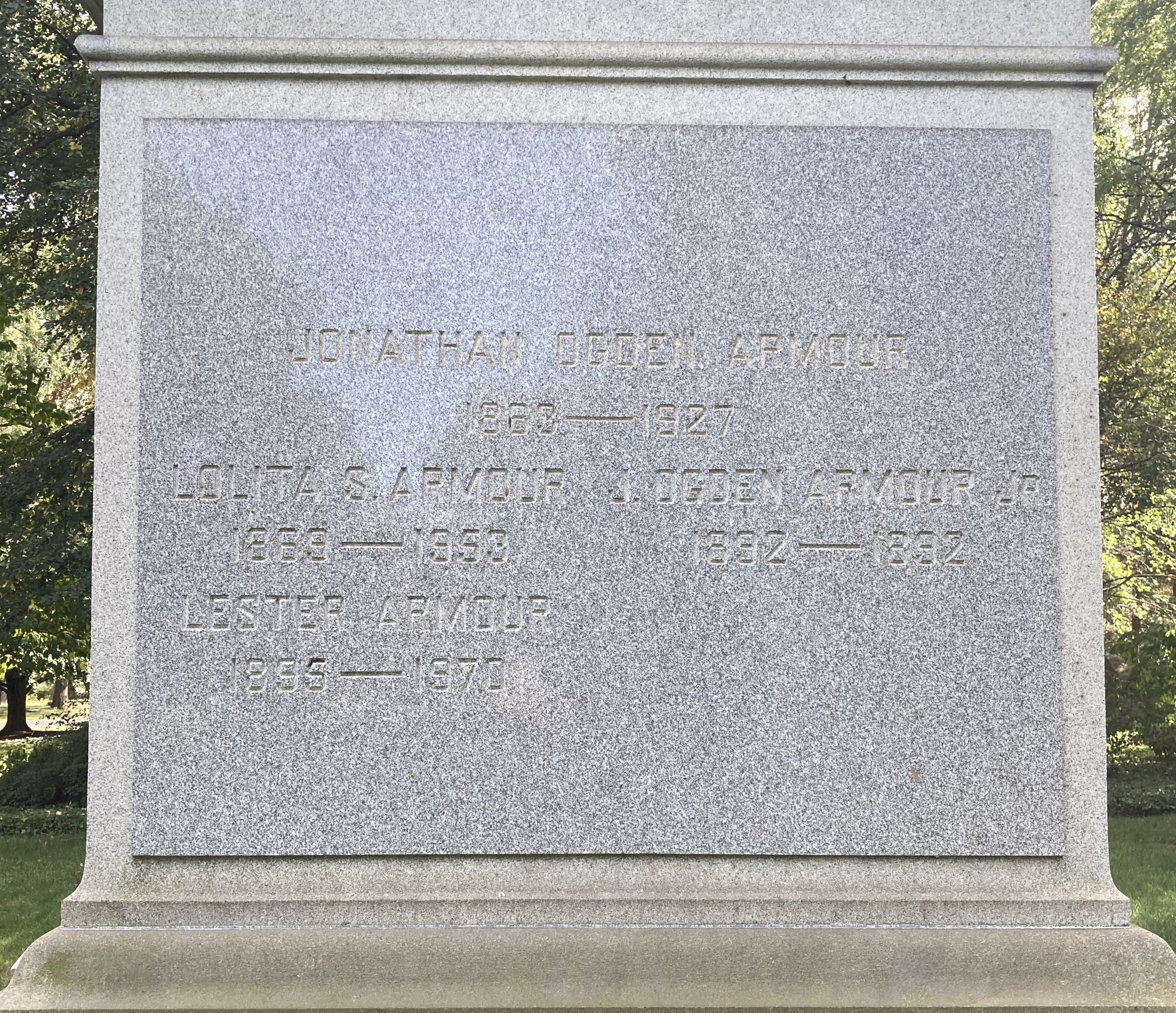
Armour's grave

== Other interests ==
- Armour also owned the Kansas City Power & Light Company and the Metropolitan Street Railway, also of Kansas City. He sold his interests in both companies in 1923. He was a significant investor in the Chicago, Milwaukee and St. Paul Railway and the Illinois Central Railroad.
- He was a co-owner of the Armour Grain Company. During a market panic on the Chicago Board of Trade in August 1914, he helped avoid a spike in wheat prices by selling hundreds of thousands of bushels of grain.
- In 1896, Armour barely eluded death by cattle stampede, when his buggy became surrounded by a herd of cattle near the Chicago Stockyards and his horse spooked.
- In 1901, the same year he took over Armour & Co., Armour donated $1 million to the Armour Institute, the college his father had founded and a predecessor of the Illinois Institute of Technology. Additionally, he was a founding director of the South Shore Country Club in Chicago.
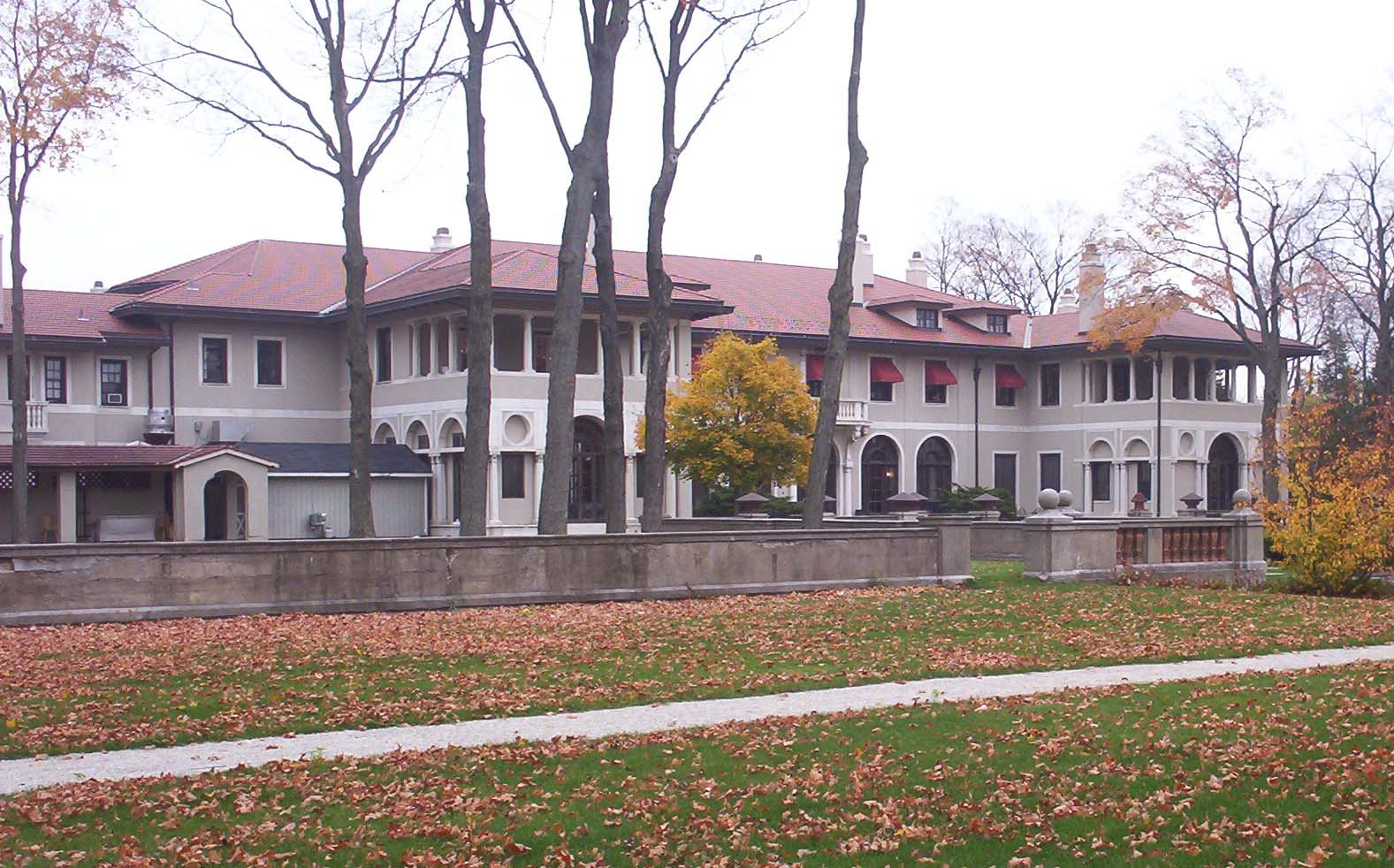
- Armour's Lake Forest mansion
  In 1909 he was a silent partner for Frederick Gilmer Bonfils and Harry Heye Tammen in the purchase of the Kansas City Post.
- Armour played a role in aviation history when he bankrolled the pioneering transcontinental flight of Cal Rodgers. Armour used the flight to promote the introduction of a grape-flavored soda called Vin Fiz. The plane, and its accompanying railroad cars, were painted with Vin Fiz logos.
- In 1916 he became a part owner of the Chicago Cubs Baseball team with William Wrigley Jr. until he was forced to give up due to business reserves.
- J. Ogden Armour wrote two books: The Packers, the Private Car Lines, and the People in 1906 and Business Problems of the War in 1917.
- In 1917 as a show of solidarity with the war effort, Armour and his wife dug up the lawns of their Chicago home at 37th Street and Michigan Avenue as well as the estate in Lake Forest and planted them with potatoes.

== In popular culture ==
Armour was the inspiration for one of the meatpacking plant owners in Upton Sinclair's classic novel, The Jungle. The 1904 strike against Armour & Co. figures in the novel's plot.

Armour and Mellody Farms appear (under pseudonyms) in Arthur Meeker, Jr.'s 1949 social satire Prairie Avenue. The novel is about the foibles of wealthy Chicagoans and their move away from Chicago's South Side.

Preceded by Philip Danforth Armour	President of Armour and Company; 1901-1923	Succeeded by F. Edson White
