= Munson Report =

1941 intelligence report on Japanese Americans

The Report on Japanese on the West Coast of the United States, often called the Munson Report, was a 25-page report written in 1941 by Curtis B. Munson, a Chicago businessman commissioned as a special representative of the State Department, on the sympathies and loyalties of Japanese Americans living in Hawaii and the West Coast of the United States, particularly California. Munson's report was submitted to the White House on October 7, 1941, exactly two months before the Japanese attack on Pearl Harbor.

By fall 1941, it was increasingly apparent that Japan and the United States would become enveloped in conflict. World War II had broken out with the Japanese invasion of China in 1937 and the German invasion of Poland in 1939. In July 1941, the United States, along with Britain and the Dutch East Indies, had imposed a total embargo on exports to Japan, including critical oil supplies. American military intelligence had broken top secret Japanese military codes, and a September 24, 1941 message indicated that Pearl Harbor was a possible target of a Japanese attack. President Franklin D. Roosevelt immediately designated Munson as a special representative and gave him the task of gauging the loyalty of Japanese Americans, many of whom lived near military bases and important manufacturing facilities.

Munson toured Hawaii and the Pacific Coast and interviewed Army and Navy intelligence officers, military commanders, city officials, and the Federal Bureau of Investigation. Munson found that "There is no Japanese problem on the West Coast," concluding that there was "a remarkable, even extraordinary degree of loyalty among this generally suspect ethnic group." The Munson Report was circulated to several Cabinet officials, including Secretary of War Henry L. Stimson, Secretary of the Navy Frank Knox, Attorney General Francis Biddle, and Secretary of State Cordell Hull.

On February 5, 1942, Stimson sent a copy of the Munson Report to President Roosevelt, along with a memo stating that War Department officials had carefully studied the document. However Executive Order 9066, ordering the internment of Japanese Americans, was signed on February 19. It is possible that Roosevelt only read the memo, and not the report itself.

== See also ==
- C. B. Munson, "Japanese on the West Coast," published as chapter 6 in Asian American Studies: A Reader (editors Jean Yu-wen Shen Wu and Min Song), Rutgers University Press, 2000.
- "C.B. Munson's "Report and Suggestions Regarding Handling the Japanese Question on the Coast," Dec. 20, 1941.." Densho Encyclopedia. 17 Jul 2015. <https://encyclopedia.densho.org/sources/en-denshopd-i67-00005-1/>.
