= Continental Illinois =

Former bank in the United States

Continental Illinois National Bank and Trust Company of Chicago
- Industry: Bank holding company
- Founded: 1910
- Defunct: 1994
- Fate: Insolvency; seized by the FDIC, ultimately sold to Bank of America
- Successor: Bank of America
- Headquarters: Chicago, Illinois, United States
- Products: Financial services

The Continental Illinois National Bank and Trust Company was an American bank established in 1910, which was at its peak the seventh-largest commercial bank in the United States as measured by deposits, with approximately $40 billion in assets.

In 1984, Continental Illinois faced what was then the largest bank failure in U.S. history, when a run on the bank led to its seizure by the Federal Deposit Insurance Corporation (FDIC). The bank nearly collapsed under the weight of bad debt associated with oil industry financing associated with the energy price boom of the late 1970s. Regulators in the 1980s determined the bank was "too big to fail", and instead arranged a rescue under new management. Continental Illinois was eventually bought out and its former assets are now part of Bank of America.

The later failure of Washington Mutual in 2008 during the 2008 financial crisis dwarfed the failure of Continental Illinois.

== History ==
=== Early history ===
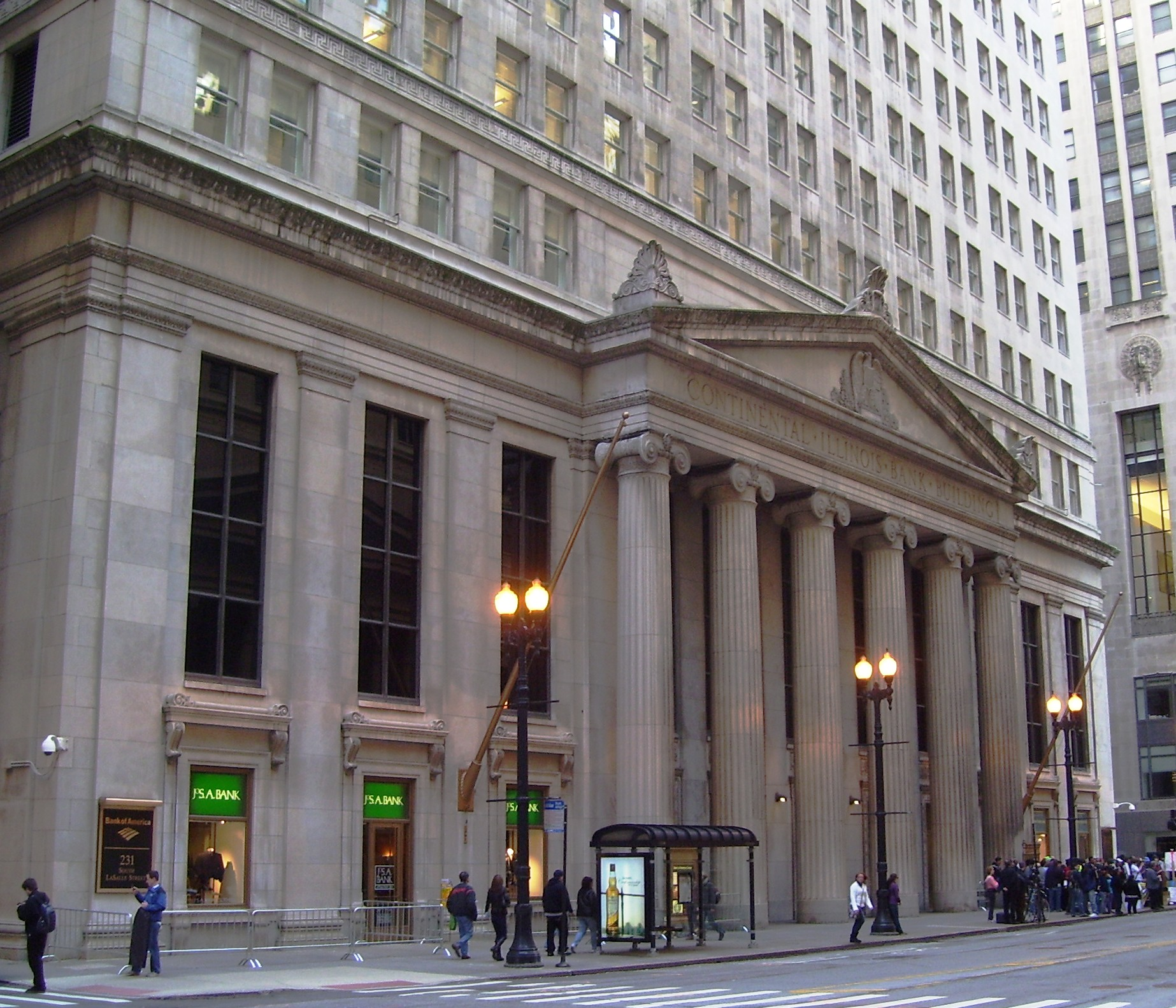
The neo-classical Continental Illinois Bank Building at 231 South LaSalle Street in Chicago, Illinois

Continental Illinois can be traced back to two Chicago banks, the Commercial National Bank, founded during the American Civil War, and the Continental National Bank, founded in 1883.

In 1910, the two banks merged to form the Continental & Commercial National Bank of Chicago with $175 million in deposits – a large bank at the time. In 1932 the name was changed to the Continental Illinois National Bank & Trust Co.

=== Insolvency ===
In May 1984, Continental Illinois became insolvent due, in part, to bad loans purchased from the failed Penn Square Bank N.A. of Oklahoma—loans for oil and gas producers and service companies and investors in the Oklahoma and Texas oil and gas boom of the late 1970s and early 1980s. Due diligence was not properly conducted by John Lytle, an executive in the Mid-Continent Division of oil lending, and other leading officers of the bank. Lytle later pleaded guilty to a count of defrauding Continental of $2.25 million and receiving $585,000 in kickbacks for approving risky loan applications. Lytle was sentenced to three and a half years in a federal prison.

The Penn Square failure eventually caused a substantial run on the bank's deposits once it became clear Continental Illinois was headed for failure. Large depositors withdrew over $10 billion of deposits in early May 1984. In addition, the bank was destabilized by massive losses from an options firm it had just acquired, First Options Chicago (FOC), a leading clearinghouse operation. FOC guaranteed that trades would settle, but found during the market's crash in October 1987 that many customers could not meet their margin calls, forcing FOC to step in with cash or the underlying securities to settle up. This meant Continental absorbed massive risks on behalf of FOC customers, in the period leading up to a major stock market crash. Nassim Nicholas Taleb later summarized the practice "...(FOC) were so incompetent... they netted exposure by traders, not realizing that the (sic) trader that goes bust, the trader making money isn't going to write (FOC) a check". Ultimately, this meant that Continental Illinois had to infuse $625M in emergency cash to keep its $135M FOC investment afloat.

The FOC crisis, and the extent to which it may have jeopardized Continental Illinois; the banking system; and the financial markets as a whole, was the subject of a hearing by the Subcommittee on Oversight and Investigations of the House Committee on Energy and Commerce, headed by Rep. John Dingell (D., Mich.), in 1988.

=== FDIC rescue ===
Due to Continental Illinois' size, regulators were not willing to let it fail. The Federal Reserve and Federal Deposit Insurance Corporation (FDIC) feared a failure could cause widespread financial trouble and instability. To avert this, regulators prevented the loss of virtually all deposit accounts and even bondholders. The FDIC infused $4.5 billion to rescue the bank. According to Daniel Yergin in The Prize: The Epic Quest for Oil, Money, and Power (1991), "The Federal Government intervened, with a huge bail-out—$5.5 billion of new capital, $8 billion in emergency loans, and, of course, new management." Chairman David Taylor was responsible for initiating this bail-out negotiation, having been an unwitting victim as he was not involved with the aforementioned loan debacle. A willing merger partner had been sought for two months but could not be found. Eventually, the board of directors and top management were removed, with former chairman Taylor being relegated to vice-chairman. Bank shareholders were substantially wiped out, although holding-company bondholders were protected. Until the seizure of Washington Mutual in 2008, the bailout of Continental Illinois under Ronald Reagan was the largest bank failure in American history.

The term "too big to fail" was popularized by Congressman Stewart McKinney in a 1984 Congressional hearing, discussing the FDIC's intervention with Continental Illinois. The term had previously been used occasionally in the press.

=== Emergence from FDIC majority ownership ===
Continental Illinois was renamed Continental Bank. It continued to exist, with the federal government effectively owning 80% of the company's shares and having the right to obtain the remainder (ultimately exercised in 1989) if losses in the rescue exceeded certain thresholds. The federal government gradually returned Continental Bank to private ownership, disposing the remainder of its shares on June 6, 1991.

In 1994, Continental Bank was acquired by Bank of America in order to broaden the latter's midwestern presence. Successor Bank of America has a retail branch and hundreds of back-office employees at Continental's former headquarters on South LaSalle Street in Chicago. Bank of America operates dozens of retail branches in the Chicago area and purchased LaSalle Bank in 2007 to expand its Chicago business and several lines of corporate and investment banking business. In 1984 the Town and Country Mastercard, issued by Continental Illinois Bank, assets were sold to Chemical Bank of New York including the remote credit card servicing centers in Hoffman Estates and Matteson Illinois. After moving the credit card staff out of the Continental facility, the operations were reopened at a new facility and rebranded Chem Credit Services later in 1984.

Continental Illinois Venture Corporation, an investment subsidiary of the bank, formed a semi-independent private equity firm, CIVC Partners, with backing from Bank of America.

=== Silver dollar holdings ===
Part of the bank's required reserves were held in silver dollars, which provided the opportunity to profit from a rise in silver prices. The holdings, estimated to be 1.5 million silver dollars, was sold to a coin dealer to raise money in the early 1980s.

== See also ==
- Bank condition
- Banking regulation
- CIVC Partners
- Early skyscrapers
