= Daisy Buchanan =

Character in The Great Gatsby, 1925 novel by F. Scott Fitzgerald

- The Great Gatsby character
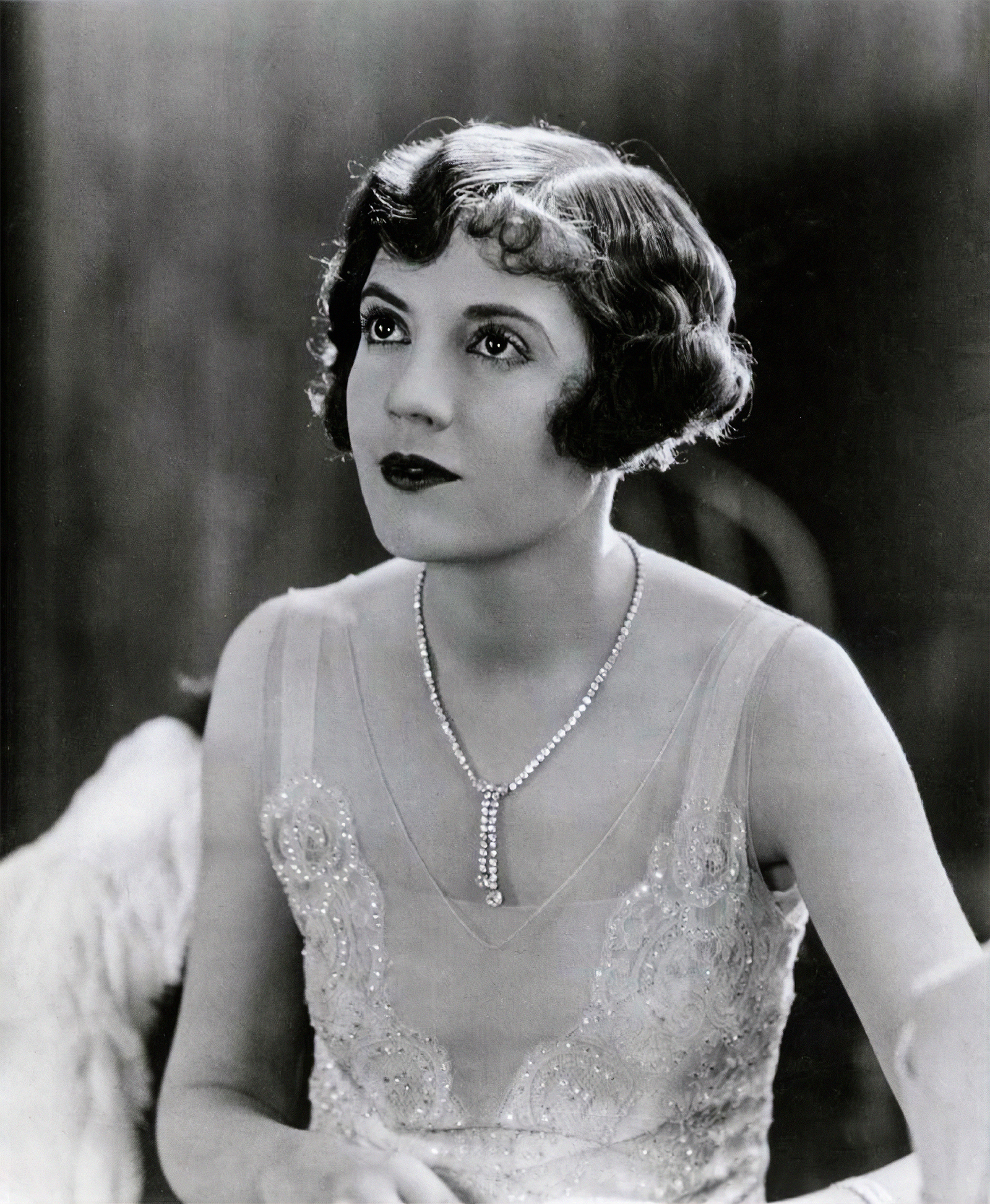
- Daisy Buchanan as portrayed by actress Lois Wilson in The Great Gatsby (1926)
- First appearance: The Great Gatsby (1925)
- Created by: F. Scott Fitzgerald
- Based on: Ginevra King
- Portrayed by: See list

In-universe information
- Full name: Daisy Fay Buchanan
- Spouse: Tom Buchanan
- Significant other: Jay Gatsby
- Children: Pammy Buchanan
- Relatives: Nick Carraway (2nd cousin)
- Origin: Kentucky
- Nationality: American

Daisy Fay Buchanan (/bjuːˈkænən/ bew-KAN-ən) is a fictional character in F. Scott Fitzgerald's 1925 novel The Great Gatsby. The character is a wealthy socialite from Louisville, Kentucky who resides in the fashionable, "old money" town of East Egg on Long Island, near New York City, during the Jazz Age. She is Nick Carraway's second cousin, once removed, and the wife of polo player Tom Buchanan, with whom she has a daughter. Before marrying Tom, Daisy had a romance with Jay Gatsby while he was stationed at nearby Camp Taylor. Her choice between Gatsby and Tom becomes the novel's central conflict.

Fitzgerald based the character on socialite Ginevra King, with whom he shared a romance from 1915 to 1917. Their relationship ended after King's father purportedly warned the writer that "poor boys shouldn't think of marrying rich girls", and a heartbroken Fitzgerald enlisted in the United States Army amid World War I. While Fitzgerald served in the army, King's father arranged her marriage to Bill Mitchell, a polo player who partly served as the model for Tom Buchanan. After King's separation from Mitchell, Fitzgerald attempted to reunite with King in 1938, but his alcoholism doomed their reunion. Scholar Maureen Corrigan states that Ginevra, far more than Fitzgerald's wife Zelda, became "the love who lodged like an irritant in Fitzgerald's imagination, producing the literary pearl that is Daisy Buchanan".

Scholars identify Daisy as personifying the cultural archetype of the flapper, young women who bobbed their hair, wore short skirts, drank alcohol and engaged in premarital sex. Despite the new societal freedoms attained by women in the 1920s, Fitzgerald's novel examines the continued limitations on their agency during this period. Although early critics viewed Daisy as a "monster of bitchery", later scholars posited that Daisy exemplifies the marginalization of women in the elite milieu that Fitzgerald depicts. The contest of wills between Tom and Gatsby reduces Daisy, described by Fitzgerald as a "golden girl", to a trophy wife whose sole existence is to augment her possessor's status, and she becomes the target of both Tom's callous domination and Gatsby's dehumanizing adoration.

The character has appeared in various media related to the novel, including stage plays, radio shows, television episodes, and films. Actress Florence Eldridge originated the role of Daisy in the 1926 Broadway adaptation of Fitzgerald's novel, on the stage at the Ambassador Theatre in New York City. That same year, Lois Wilson played the role in the now lost 1926 silent film adaptation. During the subsequent decades, many actresses have played the role, including Betty Field, Phyllis Kirk, Jeanne Crain, Mia Farrow, Mira Sorvino, Carey Mulligan, and Eva Noblezada, among others.

== Inspiration for the character ==
=== Ginevra King ===
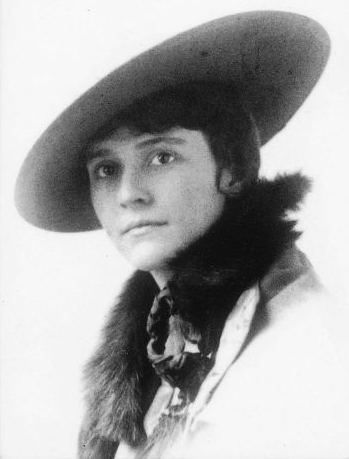
Fitzgerald primarily based the character of Daisy Buchanan on Ginevra King. His failed pursuit of King inspired the thwarted romance between Gatsby and Daisy.

Fitzgerald primarily based the character of Daisy Buchanan on Chicago socialite Ginevra King. While a Princeton sophomore, the 18-year-old aspiring writer fell in love with the 16-year-old King during a visit to his hometown of St. Paul, Minnesota. At the time, Ginevra was "a rich and wildly popular visitor from Chicago, who at sixteen had the social ease of a young duchess. A beauty with dark curling hair and large brown romantic eyes, she had an air of daring and innocent allure. To Fitzgerald, Ginevra King was the embodiment of a dream, and he was immediately and completely captivated."

Fitzgerald and King shared a passionate romance from 1915 to 1917, and King declared herself to be "madly in love" with him. During this time, Fitzgerald visited Ginevra at her family's estate in the upper-class enclave of Lake Forest, Illinois. As Lake Forest socially excluded non-White Anglo-Saxon Protestant residents, the presence of a middle-class Irish Catholic parvenu such as Fitzgerald in this milieu likely caused a stir and upset Ginevra's parents. Ginevra's imperious father, Charles Garfield King, purportedly told Fitzgerald that "poor boys shouldn't think of marrying rich girls".

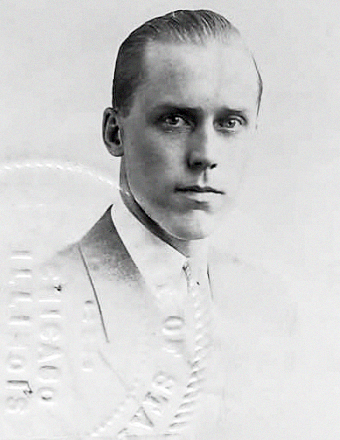
Ginevra King's father arranged her marriage to polo player Bill Mitchell, the son of a wealthy business associate. He partly served as the model for Tom Buchanan.

After her family's intervention ended their relationship, a heartbroken Fitzgerald dropped out of Princeton and enlisted in the United States Army amid World War I. While he served in the army, King informed him by letter that her father had arranged her marriage to Bill Mitchell [wd], the son of his business associate John J. Mitchell. An avid polo player, Bill Mitchell became the director of Texaco, one of the most successful oil companies, and he partly served as the model for Tom Buchanan.

According to scholar James L. W. West, Ginevra's arranged marriage to Bill Mitchell functioned as a dynastic union between two wealthy Chicago families, and Bill's brother Clarence likewise married Ginevra's sister Marjorie. By consenting to marry the scion of her father's business partner in order to cement an alliance between two powerful Chicago families, Ginevra "made the same choice Daisy Buchanan did, accepting the safe haven of money rather than waiting for a truer love to come along."

Despite his later marriage to Zelda Sayre, Fitzgerald continued to yearn for King as an unobtainable ideal who embodied the American dream. For the remainder of his life, he remained so in love with King that "he could not think of her without tears coming to his eyes". Scholar Maureen Corrigan wrote that "because she's the one who got away, Ginevra—even more than Zelda—is the love who lodged like an irritant in Fitzgerald's imagination, producing the literary pearl that is Daisy Buchanan". In subsequent years, Fitzgerald's rejection by Ginevra fueled his incipient alcoholism.

In 1937, King separated from Bill Mitchell after a tumultuous and unhappy marriage. A year later, Fitzgerald tried to reunite with King when she visited Hollywood, California, in 1938. The reunion, long anticipated by Fitzgerald, proved to be a disaster due to his alcoholism, and a disappointed King returned to Chicago. Reflecting in later years on her romance with Fitzgerald, a contrite King described her younger self as "too much in love with love to think of consequences" and as a "thoughtless," "self-centered little ass". She died in 1980 at the age of 82 at her family's estate in Charleston, South Carolina.

=== Zelda Sayre ===
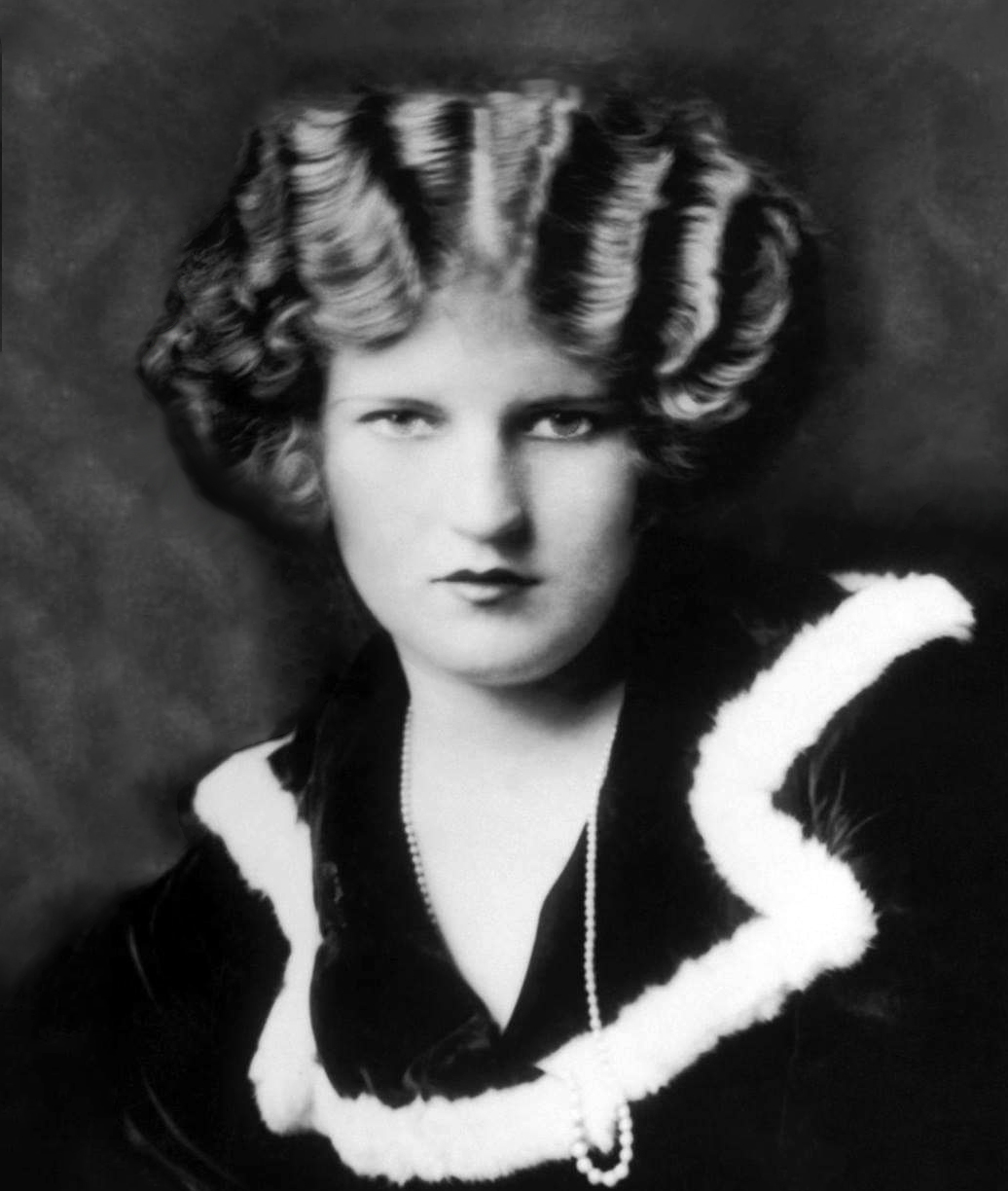
Zelda Fitzgerald, the neo-Confederate wife of F. Scott Fitzgerald. Due to Zelda's Southern upbringing, her daughter Scottie described the character of Daisy Buchanan as having an "intensely Southern nature".

To a far lesser extent, Fitzgerald partly based Daisy Buchanan on his wife Zelda Sayre, a Southern belle who reminded him of Ginevra. Like Daisy, Zelda came from a rich Southern clan. Zelda grew up in the heart of the Jim Crow South's white supremacist establishment and revered the Confederate States of America. Her father's uncle, U.S. Senator John Tyler Morgan, reigned as the Grand Dragon of Alabama's Ku Klux Klan. Her father, Anthony D. Sayre, an Alabama politician, authored the law that disenfranchised black voters and inaugurated the state's racially segregated Jim Crow era.

A staunch neo-Confederate, Zelda venerated her white supremacist father who, as a legislator and judge, embodied the "categorical imperatives of Confederate ethics" and served as "one of the sturdiest pillars" of Alabama's racial hierarchy. Embracing her family's white supremacist beliefs, Zelda described herself as "a Typhoid Mary of Confederate tradition" in Scott's "decadent world".

Like Daisy, Zelda's youth exemplified Southern "white girlhood." During her youth in Jim Crow Alabama, Zelda grew up immersed in "the white romanticism of antebellum plantation life built on slavery", and she lived a privileged existence free of any responsibilities with her every whim gratified by African American servants. Accustomed to black servants catering to her every need, an adult Zelda showed little competence in managing ordinary responsibilities, from money matters to daily tasks.

Living in a racially segregated society where the lynchings of African Americans often occurred, Zelda never questioned the brutality and injustice of her milieu. Her love for the Jim Crow South caused friction in her marriage to F. Scott Fitzgerald who disdained both the region and the Confederacy. Over time, Zelda's political views evolved from neo-Confederate beliefs toward an espousal of fascism as a political creed. Likely due to Zelda's Southern upbringing, her daughter Scottie Fitzgerald described the character of Daisy Buchanan as having an "intensely Southern nature".

"I don't know what it is in me or that comes to me when I start to write. I am half feminine—at least my mind is..."

— F. Scott Fitzgerald, Private Correspondence, 1935

Daisy's remark, "I hope she'll be a fool... a beautiful little fool", is partly attributable to Zelda, although Scott authored the additional observation, "That's the best thing a girl can be in this world". After the birth of his daughter Scottie in October 1921, in Saint Paul, Minnesota, Fitzgerald heard his anesthetized wife murmur: "Oh God, goofo [sic] I'm drunk. Mark Twain. Isn't she smart—she has the hiccups. I hope it's beautiful and a fool—a beautiful little fool."

Four years later, Scott wrote Daisy's famous line about her daughter Pammy: "That's the best thing a girl can be in this world, a beautiful little fool." The sentence reflects Fitzgerald's identification with the plight of women in 1920s America and echoes his description of himself as "half feminine". Although "born masculine," Fitzgerald claimed his mind to be "half feminine" and described his fictional women as "feminine Scott Fitzgeralds." These remarks have fueled debate about his sexuality. (Note: Fessenden (2005) argues that Fitzgerald struggled with his sexual orientation. In contrast, Bruccoli (2002) insists that "anyone can be called a latent homosexual, but there is no evidence that Fitzgerald was ever involved in a homosexual attachment".) Zelda described him as a closeted homosexual, abused him with homophobic slurs, and alleged that he and Ernest Hemingway engaged in sexual relations. These attacks on his sexual identity, as well as Zelda's purported extramarital affair while in Europe, strained their marriage at the time of his novel's publication.

== Fictional character biography ==
"She's got an indiscreet voice," I remarked. "It's full of—" I hesitated.

"Her voice is full of money," he said suddenly.

That was it. I'd never understood before. It was full of money—that was the inexhaustible charm that rose and fell in it, the jingle of it, the cymbals' song of it.... High in the white palace the king's daughter, the golden girl....

— F. Scott Fitzgerald, Chapter VII, The Great Gatsby

Raised in luxury in Louisville, Kentucky, during the Jim Crow period, Daisy entertains many suitors from her privileged social class. In 1917, she enters into a month-long relationship with Army First lieutenant Jay Gatsby that ends with them promising to marry each other. While Gatsby serves in World War I, Daisy marries the wealthy polo player Thomas "Tom" Buchanan. The couple moves to East Egg, an "old money" enclave on Long Island, where they reside in a cheerful red-and-white Georgian Colonial mansion overlooking Manhasset Bay.

After her second cousin once removed, Nick Carraway moves to a bungalow in the neighboring nouveau riche town of West Egg on Long Island, he encounters Gatsby who lives next door. Gatsby has become a millionaire and schemes to reunite with Daisy regardless of her marital status. Gatsby throws extravagant soirées at his mansion in the hope that Daisy might attend. At Gatsby's request, Nick arranges a private meeting between Daisy and Gatsby at his bungalow in West Egg. The two meet again for the first time in five years and begin an affair.

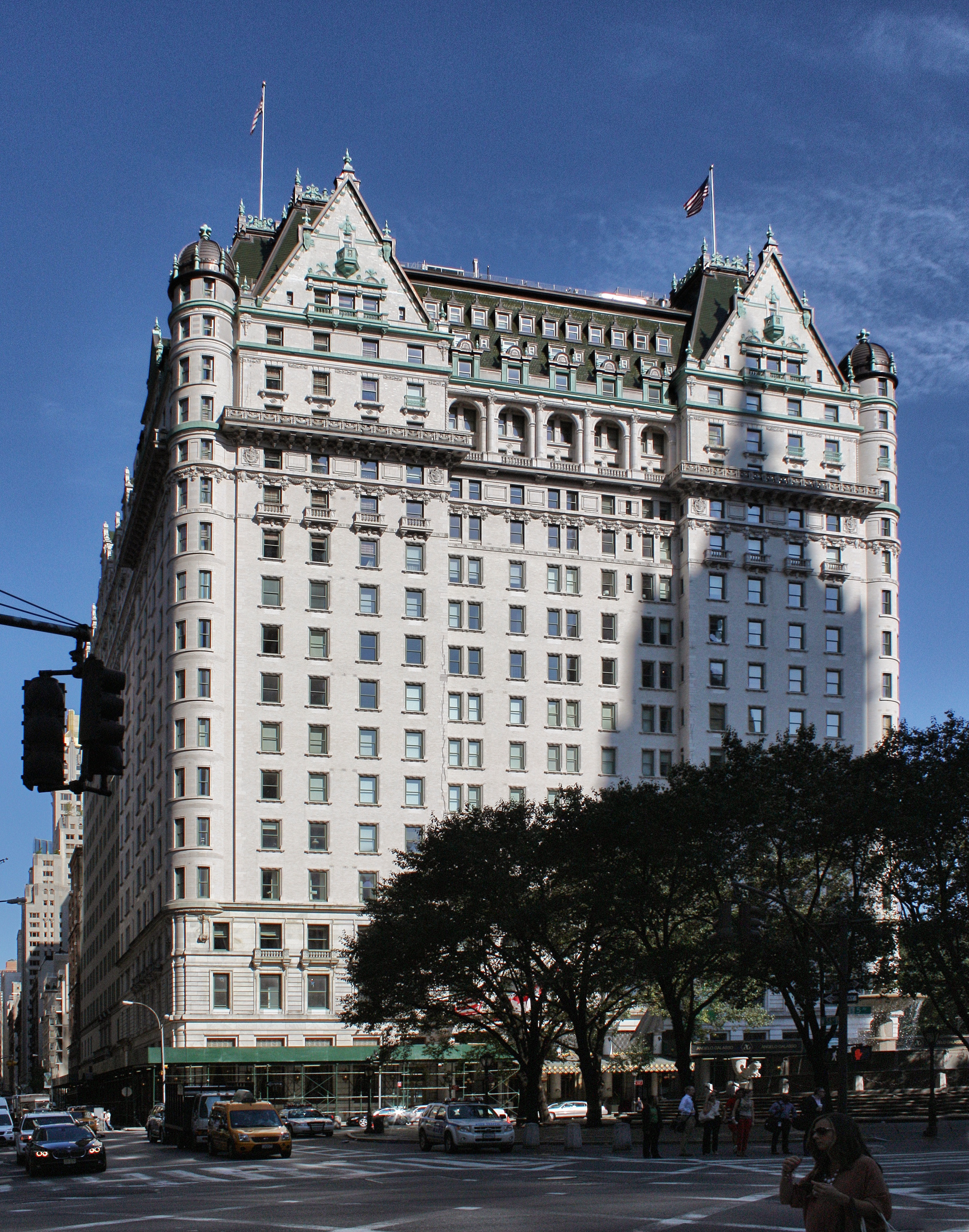
Gatsby and Tom's struggle for Daisy's love culminates at the Plaza Hotel.

Later at the Buchanan residence, Daisy, Tom, and Gatsby—as well as her friends Nick and Jordan Baker—decide to visit the 20-story Plaza Hotel, a château-like edifice in New York City with an architectural style inspired by the French Renaissance. Tom embarks in Gatsby's yellow Rolls-Royce with Jordan and Nick, while Daisy and Gatsby drive alone in Tom's blue coupé. After arriving at the hotel, Tom confronts Gatsby about Daisy's infidelity. A confrontation between Tom and Gatsby ensues over Daisy's love. Though Gatsby insists that Daisy never loved Tom, Daisy admits that she loved both Tom and Gatsby. The confrontation ends with Daisy leaving with Gatsby in his yellow car, while Tom departs with Nick and Jordan.

Having previously glimpsed Tom driving Gatsby's yellow car through a sprawling refuse dump known as the "valley of ashes", Tom's mistress, Myrtle Wilson, sees the distinctive vehicle approach that evening on its return to East Egg. Presuming the car is still driven by Tom, she runs into the road, hoping to intercept him and to reconcile with him. Daisy runs over Myrtle. Gatsby stops the car by applying the emergency brake and then takes over driving from Daisy, fleeing the scene of the accident.

Gatsby assures Daisy that he will take the blame for Myrtle's death and bear all repercussions. Tom informs Myrtle's husband, George Wilson, that Gatsby killed Myrtle. A distraught George travels to Gatsby's mansion in West Egg and shoots Gatsby dead before turning the weapon on himself. After Gatsby's murder, Daisy, Tom, and their daughter depart East Egg, leaving no forwarding address.

== Critical analysis ==
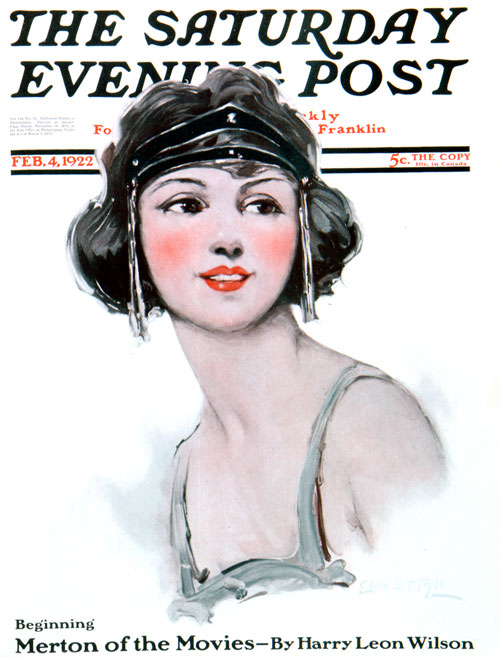
An upper-class Jazz Age flapper as depicted by Ellen Pyle for the February 1922 cover of The Saturday Evening Post.

The character of Daisy Buchanan has been identified by scholars as personifying the Jazz Age archetype of the flapper, young, modern women who bobbed their hair, wore short skirts, drank alcohol and engaged in premarital sex. Despite the newfound societal freedoms attained by flappers in the 1920s, Fitzgerald's novel examines the continued limitations on women's agency during this period. In this context, although early critics viewed the character of Daisy to be a "monster of bitchery", later scholars posit the character exemplifies the marginalization of women in the elite milieu that Fitzgerald depicts.

In the 1940s and 1950s, scholars and critics condemned Daisy as an irredeemable villain. Critic Marius Bewley deplored the character's "vicious emptiness," Robert Ornstein dubbed her "criminally immoral," Alfred Kazin judged her to be "vulgar and inhuman," and Leslie Fiedler regarded her as a "dark destroyer" purveying "corruption and death". In these earlier critiques, scholars likened Gatsby to an innocent victim and equated Daisy with "foul dust [that] floated in the wake of his dreams". As late as 1978, scholar Rose Gallo described Daisy as "a vacuous creature" whose beauty conceals her emotional bankruptcy.

Revisionist opinions about the character emerged in the 1960s and 1970s. Writing in 1978, scholar Leland Person viewed Daisy as more of a hapless victim than a manipulative victimizer. Daisy endures first Tom's callous domination and next Gatsby's dehumanizing adoration. Described by Fitzgerald as a "golden girl", she involuntarily becomes the holy grail at the center of Gatsby's unrealistic quest to be steadfast to a youthful concept of himself. The ensuing contest of wills between Gatsby and Tom reduces Daisy to a trophy wife whose sole existence is to augment her possessor's status.

As an upper-class White Anglo-Saxon Protestant woman, Daisy adheres to societal expectations and gender norms such as fulfilling the roles of dutiful wife, nurturing mother, and charming socialite. Many of Daisy's choices—culminating in the fatal car crash and misery for all those involved—can be partly attributed to her prescribed role as a "beautiful little fool" who is reliant on her husband for socioeconomic security. Her decision to remain with Tom, despite her feelings for Gatsby, is ascribable to the status and security that her marriage provides.

Notwithstanding this scholarly reevaluation, many readers continue to regard Daisy as an antagonist or an antiheroine. Often listed as among the most "polarizing female characters in American literature," readers frequently vilify Daisy for the consequences of her actions, such as directly and indirectly causing the deaths of several characters. Writer Ester Bloom opined in The Hairpin that Daisy, although not technically the story's villain, "still sucks, and if it weren't for her, a couple of key players in the book would be alive at the end of it."

Despite such antipathy, some readers sympathize with the character. Writer Katie Baker observed in The Globe and Mail that, although Daisy lives and Gatsby dies, "in the end, both Gatsby and Daisy have lost their youthful dreams, that sense of eternal possibility that made the summertimes sweet. And love her or hate her, there's something to pity in that irrevocable fact." Dave McGinn listed the character as one who needed their side of the story told, and he wondered what her thoughts were on the love triangle between her, Gatsby and Tom.

== Daisy as a reference point ==
"They were careless people, Tom and Daisy—they smashed up things and creatures and then retreated back into their money or their vast carelessness, or whatever it was that kept them together, and let other people clean up the mess they had made..."

— F. Scott Fitzgerald, Chapter IX, The Great Gatsby

Daisy and her husband Tom are often invoked in popular discourse in the context of careless indifference by affluent persons. Amid the 2016 United States presidential election, New York Times columnist Maureen Dowd likened Hillary Clinton and Bill Clinton to Daisy and Tom Buchanan due to their perceived carelessness in the political arena. "That's the corkscrew way things go with the Clintons, who are staying true to their reputation as the Tom and Daisy Buchanan of American politics," Maureen Dowd wrote, "Their vast carelessness drags down everyone around them, but they persevere, and even thrive."

Four years later, in October 2020, New York Times writer Ian Prasad Philbrick compared the response of Donald Trump's administration to the COVID-19 pandemic to the careless indifference of Daisy and Tom Buchanan. The "blasé Buchanans in the novel's final pages," Philbrick wrote, "seemed to fit an administration that has attempted to downplay the pandemic, even after Trump and other top Republicans tested positive for Covid-19."

Daisy has been cited as a role model for young women who aspire to attain wealth and to live life for the moment. "You should take Daisy's advice: be a 'fool'," urged writer Carlie Lindower, "Be a fool and covet only what is on the surface—the pearls, the furs, the immaculate lawn—because any deeper than that is murky territory filled with misguided ideals and broken pillars of feminism." Similarly, Inga Ting of The Sydney Morning Herald posited that Daisy's materialistic ambitions are both understandable and rational. "Men want beauty," Ting opined, "women want money".

The character of Daisy Buchanan is often referenced in popular culture in terms of Jazz Age and flapper aesthetics. In the wake of Baz Luhrmann's 2013 film featuring Daisy with a bob cut, certain versions of the hairstyle became retroactively associated with the character, and the character's physical description became synonymous with 1920s glamour.

== Portrayals ==
=== Stage ===
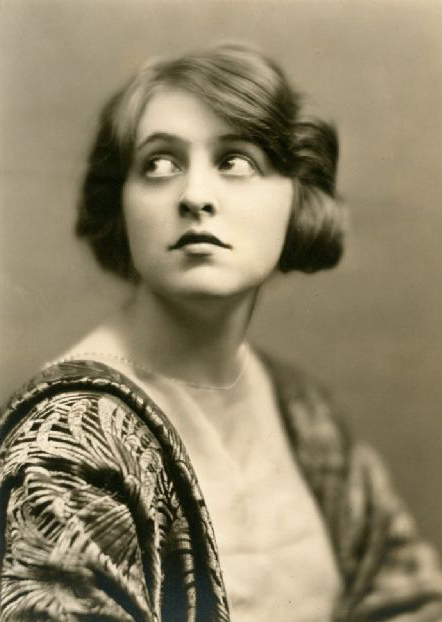
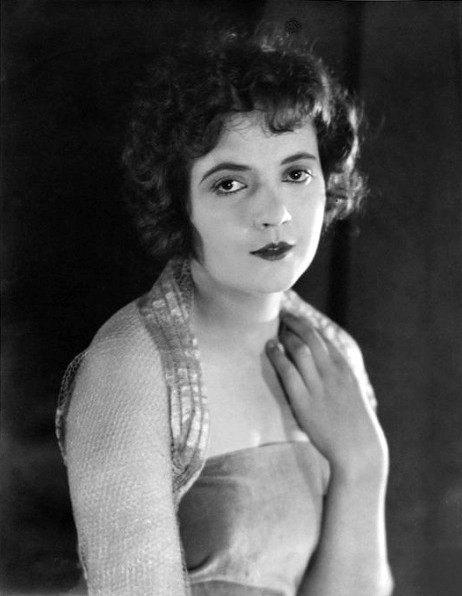
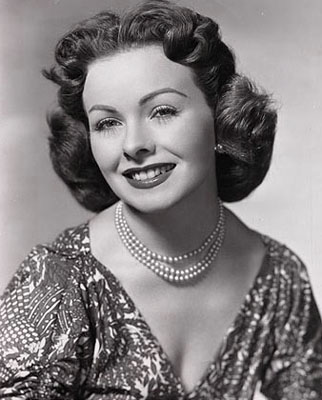
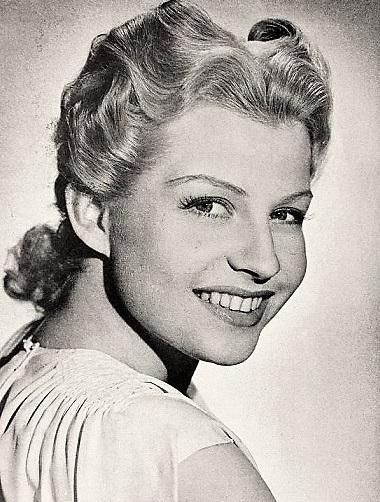
Florence Eldridge (first) originated the role of Daisy Buchanan on the Broadway stage in 1926. Lois Wilson (second) became the first screen actress to portray Daisy in the lost 1926 film. Jeanne Crain (third) and Betty Field (fourth) portrayed Daisy in later adaptations.

Florence Eldridge, a 24-year-old actress, became the first person to portray Daisy Buchanan in any medium, starring in the 1926 Broadway adaptation of Fitzgerald's novel at the Ambassador Theatre in New York City. Directed by George Cukor, the production ran for 112 performances, delighting audiences and garnering rave reviews. Vacationing in Europe at the time, Fitzgerald missed the Broadway play, but his agent Harold Ober sent telegrams quoting the positive reviews. A year later, Elderidge married actor Fredric March in 1927.

In Eldridge's footsteps, many other actresses portrayed Daisy Buchanan on the stage. In 1958, Robyn Cotner portrayed Daisy in the first musical adaptation of Fitzgerald's novel. In 1999, Dawn Upshaw portrayed the character in John Harbison's operatic adaptation of the work performed at the New York Metropolitan Opera, and Heidi Armbruster portrayed Daisy in Simon Levy's 2006 stage adaptation in a performance described by critic Quinton Skinner as "full of loony momentary enthusiasms and a dangerous sensuality, though by the second act, Armbruster's perf [sic] veers toward hollow mannerisms."

Monte McGrath portrayed Daisy in a 2012 version of the same play by Simon Levy, and her performance received acclaim. Madeleine Herd played Daisy in a 2015 adaptation by Independent Theater Productions. In the fall of 2023, Eva Noblezada played Daisy in The Great Gatsby: A New Musical, which transferred to Broadway in March 2024; Sarah Hyland and Aisha Jackson both later replaced Noblezada as Daisy. Then in 2026, Eva Noblezada returned to the role of Daisy. Charlotte MacInnes played the role of Daisy in Florence Welch's musical Gatsby: An American Myth which premiered at the American Repertory Theatre in the summer of 2024.

=== Film ===
Paramount Pictures produced a 1926 silent film adaptation featuring Lois Wilson as Daisy. In contrast to later adaptations, two women adapted Fitzgerald's novel for the screen: Elizabeth Meehan wrote the film treatment, and Becky Gardiner wrote the screenplay. Although a few critics found Lois Wilson's interpretation of Daisy to be unsympathetic, other critics raved that Wilson reached "heights of emotional acting in the picture which she never before attained" and did "the best acting of her career." Notwithstanding Wilson's performance, Fitzgerald's wife Zelda loathed the 1926 film adaptation of his novel and walked out during a viewing of the film at a theater. "We saw The Great Gatsby at the movies," Zelda wrote to an acquaintance, "It's ROTTEN and awful and terrible and we left." The film is now lost.

In 1949, Paramount Pictures undertook a second film adaptation starring Betty Field as Daisy. In contrast to the 1926 adaptation, Production Code Administration censors compelled the screenwriters to bowdlerize the novel's plot by eliding Daisy's infidelity. According to screenwriter Richard Maibaum, Field's performance as Daisy divided critics. Lew Sheaffer wrote in The Brooklyn Daily Eagle that Field performed "the difficult feat of making a strong impact" as Gatsby's "vague, shilly-shallying sweetheart." Boyd Martin of The Courier-Journal opined that Field convincingly portrayed Daisy's shallowness, whereas Wanda Hale of The New York Daily News complained that Field gave "such a restrained, delicate performance that you have to use some imagination to understand her weakness."

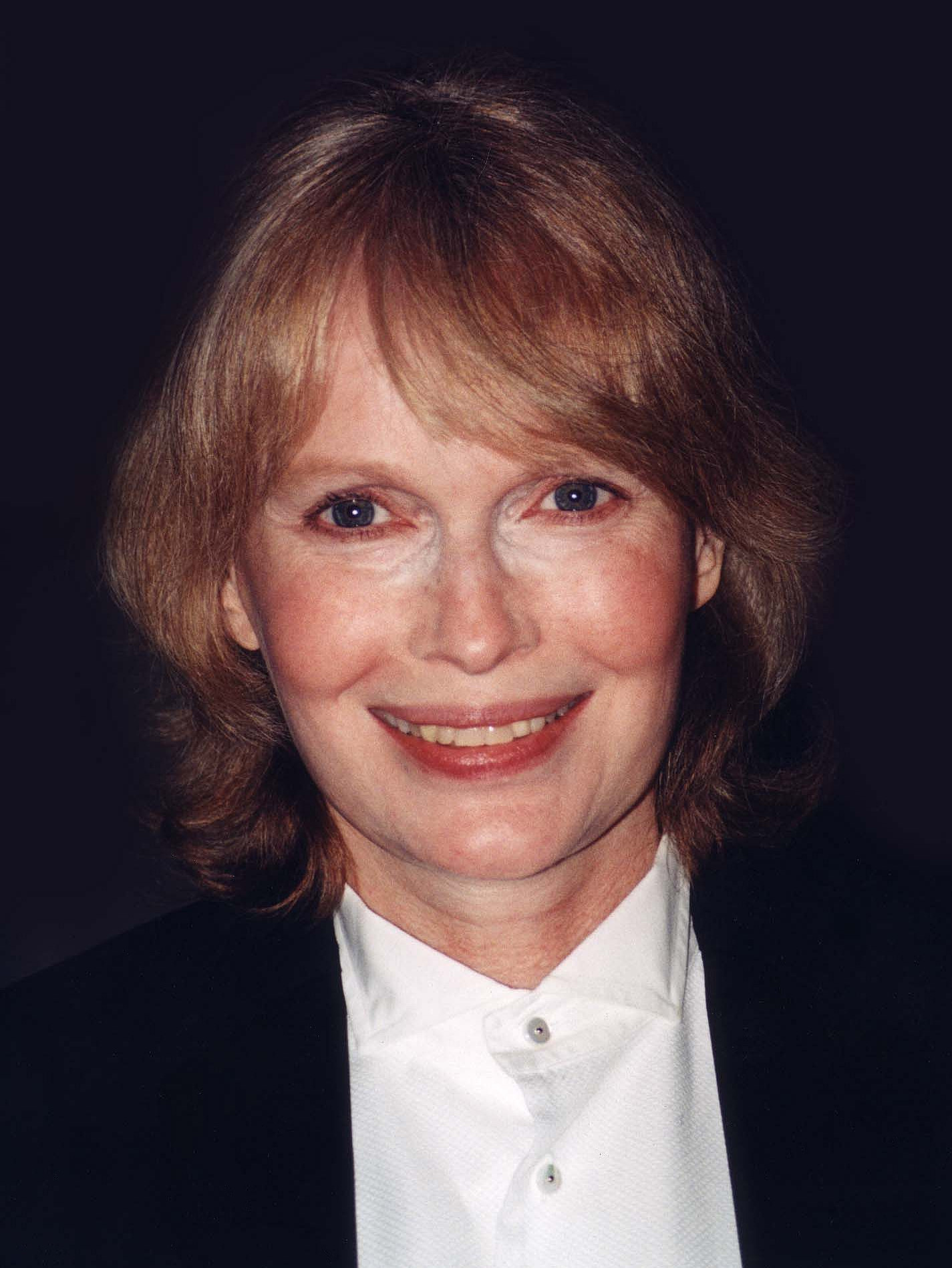
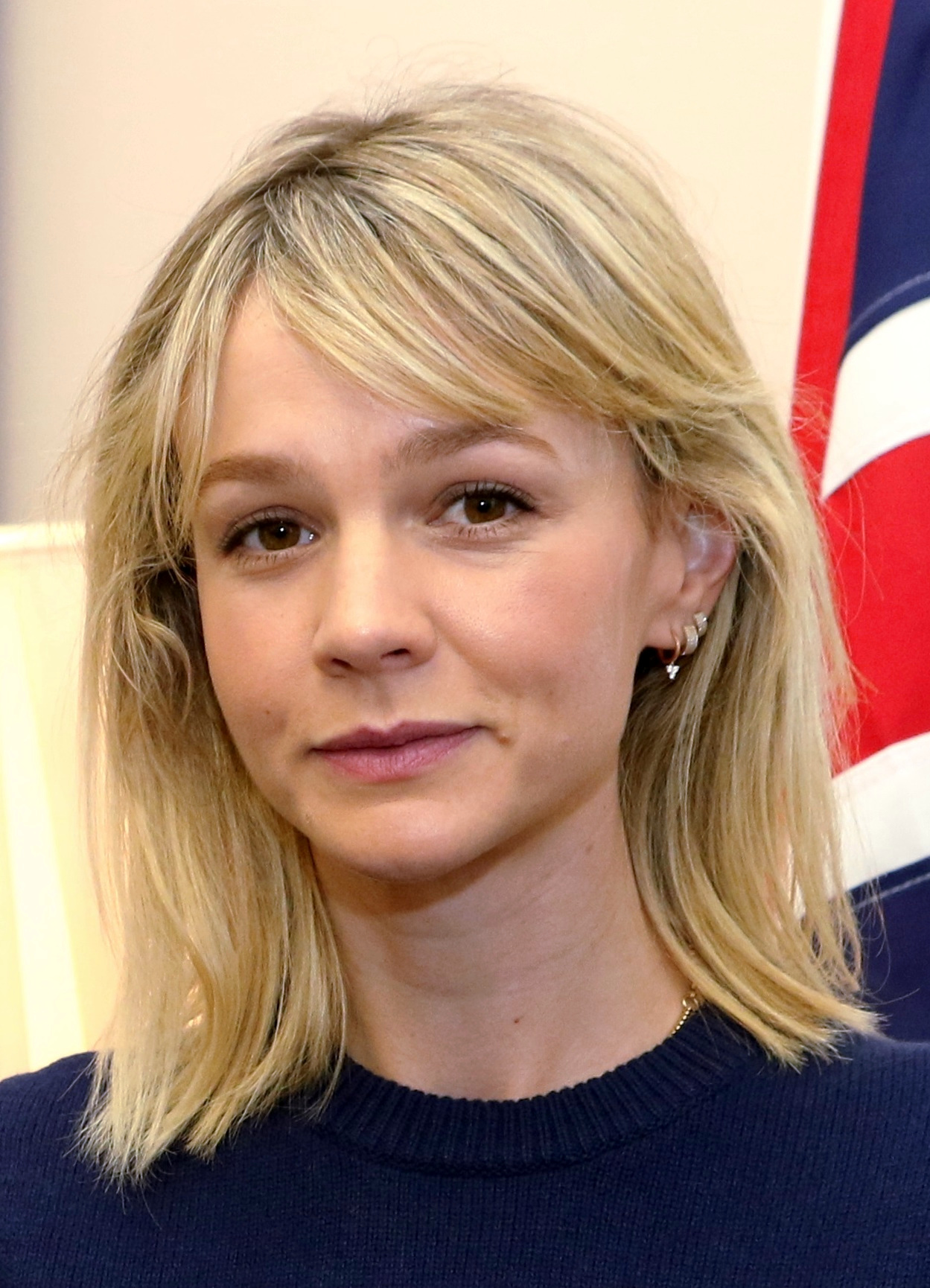
Mia Farrow (first) played Daisy in the 1974 film. Carey Mulligan (second) played the role in the 2013 film.

In 1974, Mia Farrow portrayed Daisy in a third film adaptation. Her performance met with a mixed reception. Bruce Handy of Vanity Fair praised Farrow as "full of vain flutter and the seductive instant intimacy of the careless rich". Vincent Canby of The New York Times, in an otherwise negative review, complimented Farrow's performance as "a woman who cannot conceive of the cruelties she so casually commits". Roger Ebert lamented that Farrow played Daisy as "all squeaks and narcissism and empty sophistication", and Gene Siskel complained that Farrow interpreted Daisy to be a "skittish child-woman". Upon viewing the 1974 film, Fitzgerald's daughter Frances "Scottie" Fitzgerald criticized Farrow's performance and opined that Farrow couldn't convey the "Southern nature" of Daisy's character.

In 2013, Carey Mulligan portrayed Daisy in a fourth film adaptation. Director Baz Luhrmann cast Mulligan as Daisy after two 90-minute auditions with actor Leonardo DiCaprio, who portrayed Gatsby. Mulligan partly based her performance on the Kardashian family, specifically "looking very present, presentational, and perfect." Although familiar with popular antipathy towards the character, Mulligan felt she could not "think that about her, because I can't play her thinking she's awful." In a review of the 2013 film, Todd McCarthy of The Hollywood Reporter wrote that viewers with their own ideas about Daisy's character would debate whether Mulligan possessed "the beauty, the bearing, the dream qualities desired for the part, but she lucidly portrays the desperate tear Daisy feels between her unquestionable love for Gatsby and fear of her husband." Critic Jonathan Romney of The Independent praised Mulligan's "reassuringly candid presence" that he described as "weary, wan, with a dash of Blanche DuBois."

=== Television ===
Phyllis Kirk portrayed Daisy in a 1955 episode of the television series Robert Montgomery Presents adapting The Great Gatsby. Reviewers deemed Kirk's interpretation of Daisy to be merely adequate as "the distraught lady across the bay". Three years later, Jeanne Crain played Daisy in a 1958 episode of the television series Playhouse 90.

Mira Sorvino played Daisy in the 2000 television adaptation. Produced on a small budget, the adaptation suffered from low production values, and television critics panned Sorvino's performance. Natasha Joffe of The Guardian wrote that Sorvino's "voice is supposed to be full of money, but is just moany. Why would Gatsby love her? She looks like a drowned goose and her hats are like they've been made out of old pants." Similarly, John Crook of The Fremont Tribune declared Sorvino to be "seriously miscast as Daisy". In 2007, Tricia Paoluccio portrayed Daisy in PBS' American Masters television episode titled "Novel Reflections: The American Dream".

=== Radio ===
Irene Dunne starred as Daisy in an adaptation broadcast on Family Hour of Stars on January 1, 1950, and Pippa Bennett-Warner played Daisy in the 2012 two-part Classic Serial production.

=== List ===
Year	Title	Actor	Format	Distributor	Rotten Tomatoes	Metacritic
1926	The Great Gatsby	Florence Eldridge	Stage	Broadway (Ambassador Theatre)	—N/a	—N/a
1926	The Great Gatsby	Lois Wilson	Film	Paramount Pictures	55% (22 reviews)	—N/a
1949	The Great Gatsby	Betty Field	Film	Paramount Pictures	33% (9 reviews)	—N/a
1950	The Great Gatsby	Irene Dunne	Radio	Family Hour of Stars	—N/a	—N/a
1955	The Great Gatsby	Phyllis Kirk	Television	Robert Montgomery Presents	—N/a	—N/a
1956	The Great Gatsby	Robyn Cotner	Musical	Yale Dramatic Association	—N/a	—N/a
1958	The Great Gatsby	Jeanne Crain	Television	Playhouse 90	—N/a	—N/a
1974	The Great Gatsby	Mia Farrow	Film	Paramount Pictures	41% (41 reviews)	43 (5 reviews)
1999	The Great Gatsby	Dawn Upshaw	Opera	New York Metropolitan Opera	—N/a	—N/a
2000	The Great Gatsby	Mira Sorvino	Television	A&E Television Networks	—N/a	—N/a
2006	The Great Gatsby	Heidi Armbruster	Stage	Guthrie Theater	—N/a	—N/a
2012	The Great Gatsby	Pippa Bennett-Warner	Radio	BBC Radio 4	—N/a	—N/a
2013	The Great Gatsby	Carey Mulligan	Film	Warner Bros. Pictures	48% (301 reviews)	55 (45 reviews)
2023	The Great Gatsby	Eva Noblezada	Musical	Broadway (Paper Mill Playhouse/Broadway Theatre)	—N/a	—N/a
2024	Gatsby: An American Myth	Charlotte MacInnes	Musical	American Repertory Theater	—N/a	—N/a

== See also ==
- Adaptations and portrayals of F. Scott Fitzgerald
