= Jay Gatsby =

Character in the novel The Great Gatsby

- The Great Gatsby character
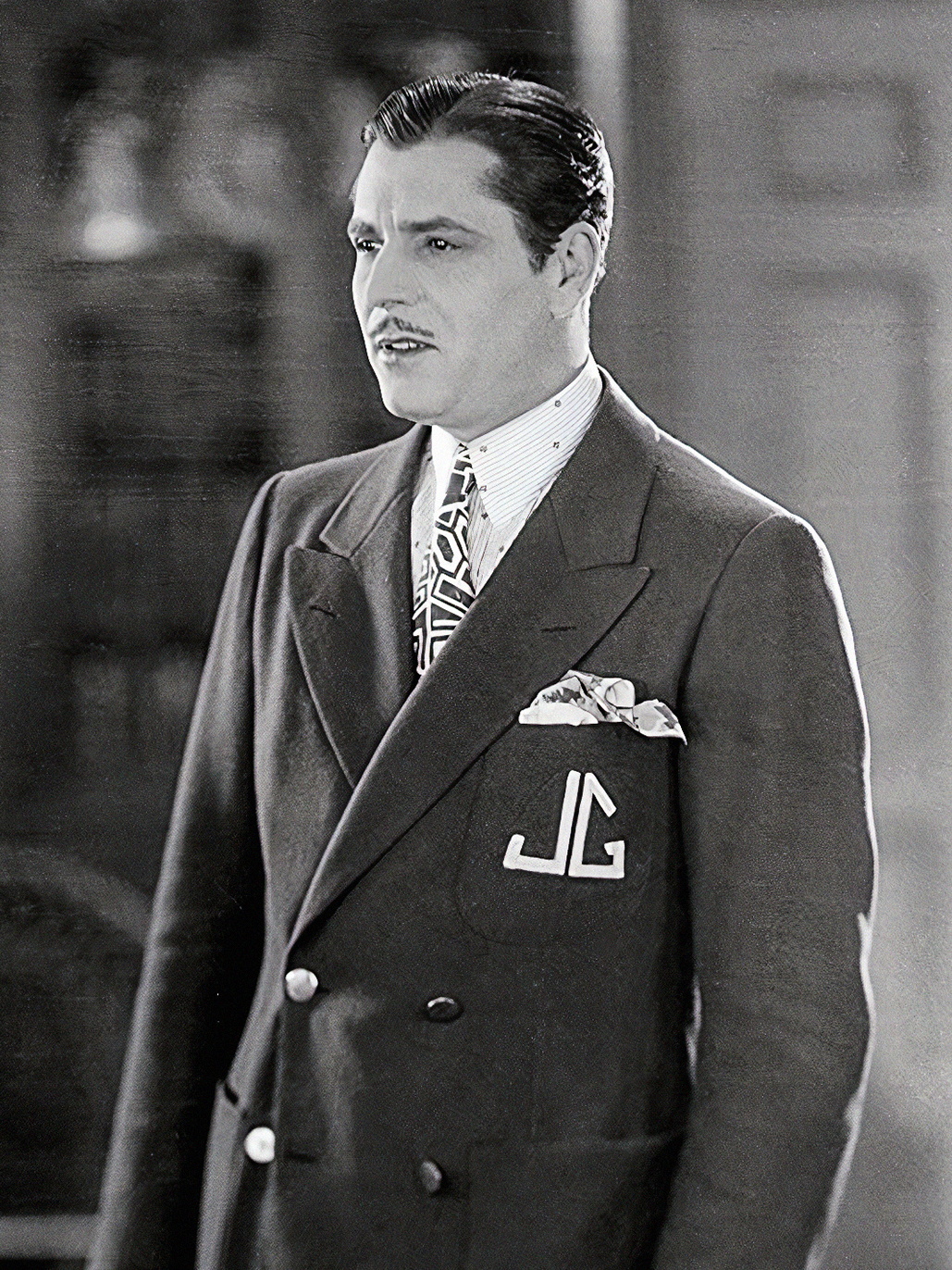
- Jay Gatsby as portrayed by Warner Baxter in The Great Gatsby (1926)
- First appearance: The Great Gatsby (1925)
- Created by: F. Scott Fitzgerald
- Based on: Max Gerlach
- Portrayed by: See list

In-universe information
- Full name: James Gatz (birth name)
- Alias: Jay Gatsby
- Gender: Male
- Occupation: Army Officer; Bootlegger
- Family: Henry C. Gatz (father)
- Significant other: Daisy Buchanan
- Religion: Lutheran
- Origin: North Dakota
- Nationality: American

Jay Gatsby (/ɡætsbiː/) (originally named James Gatz) is the titular fictional character of F. Scott Fitzgerald's 1925 novel The Great Gatsby. The character is an enigmatic nouveau riche millionaire who lives in a Long Island mansion where he often hosts extravagant parties and who allegedly gained his fortune by illicit bootlegging during prohibition in the United States. Fitzgerald based many details about the fictional character on Max Gerlach, a mysterious neighbor and World War I veteran whom the author met in New York during the raucous Jazz Age. Like Gatsby, Gerlach threw lavish parties, never wore the same shirt twice, used the phrase "old sport", claimed to be educated at Oxford University, and fostered myths about himself, including that he was a relative of Wilhelm II.

The character of Jay Gatsby has been analyzed by scholars for many decades and has given rise to a number of critical interpretations. Scholars posit that Gatsby functions as a cipher because of his obscure origins, his unclear religio-ethnic identity and his indeterminate class status. Accordingly, Gatsby's socio-economic ascent is deemed a threat by other characters in the novel not only due to his status as nouveau riche, but because he is perceived as a societal outsider. The character's biographical details indicate his family are recent immigrants which precludes Gatsby from the status of an Old Stock American. As the embodiment of "latest America", Gatsby's rise triggers status anxieties typical of the 1920s era, involving xenophobia and anti-immigrant sentiment.

A century after the novel's publication in April 1925, Gatsby has become a touchstone in American culture and is often evoked in popular media in the context of the American dream—the belief that every individual, regardless of their origins, may seek and achieve their desired goals, "be they political, monetary, or social. It is the literary expression of the concept of America: The land of opportunity". Gatsby has been described by scholars as a false prophet of the American dream as pursuing the dream often results in dissatisfaction for those who chase it, owing to its unattainability.

The character has appeared in various media adaptations of the novel, including stage plays, radio shows, video games, and feature films. Canadian-American actor James Rennie originated the role of Gatsby on the stage when he headlined the 1926 Broadway adaptation of Fitzgerald's novel at the Ambassador Theatre in New York City. He repeated the role for 112 performances. That same year, screen actor Warner Baxter played the role in the lost 1926 silent film adaptation. During the subsequent decades, the role has been played by many actors including Alan Ladd, Kirk Douglas, Robert Ryan, Robert Redford, Leonardo DiCaprio, Jeremy Jordan, Ryan McCartan, Jamie Muscato, and others.

== Inspiration for the character ==
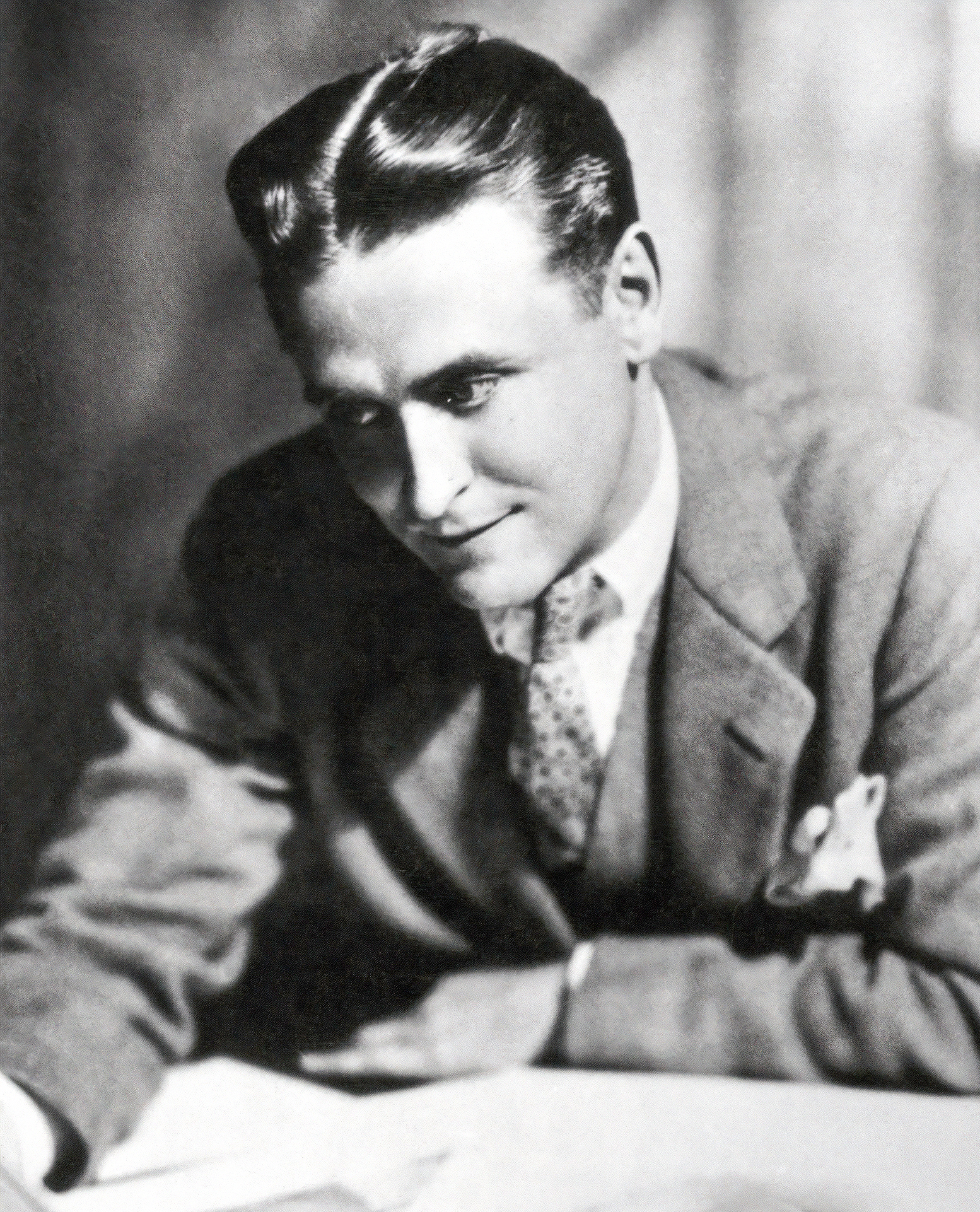
F. Scott Fitzgerald (left) partly based the character of Jay Gatsby on his wealthy neighbor Max Gerlach (right). (Note: Both Zelda Fitzgerald and F. Scott Fitzgerald's friend Edmund Wilson stated that Max Gerlach was a neighbor. Scholars have yet to find surviving property records for a Long Island estate with Gerlach's name. However, there are likely "gaps in the record of his addresses", and an accurate reconstruction of Gerlach's life is hindered "by the imperfect state of relevant documentation".) The character's obsession with Daisy Buchanan was based on Fitzgerald's romantic pursuit of Chicago heiress Ginevra King. (Note: Gatsby's pursuit of Daisy was inspired by Fitzgerald's life-long obsession with socialite Ginevra King. As Maureen Corrigan notes: "Because she's the one who got away, Ginevra—more than Zelda—is the love who lodged like an irritant in Fitzgerald's imagination, producing the literary pearl that is Daisy Buchanan".)

After the publication and success of his debut novel This Side of Paradise in 1920, F. Scott Fitzgerald and his wife Zelda Sayre relocated to a wealthy enclave on Long Island near New York City. Despite enjoying the exclusive Long Island milieu, Fitzgerald disapproved of the extravagant parties, and the wealthy persons he encountered often disappointed him. While striving to emulate the rich, he found their privileged lifestyle to be morally disquieting, and he felt repulsed by their careless indifference to less wealthy persons.

Like Gatsby, Fitzgerald admired the rich, but he nonetheless harbored a deep resentment towards them. This recurrent theme is ascribable to Fitzgerald's life experiences in which he was "a poor boy in a rich town; a poor boy in a rich boy's school; a poor boy in a rich man's club at Princeton." He "sensed a corruption in the rich and mistrusted their might." Consequently, he became a vocal critic of America's leisure class and his works satirized their lives.

While living in New York, writer F. Scott Fitzgerald's enigmatic neighbor was Max Gerlach. Gerlach claimed to be born in America to a German immigrant family, (Note: In a 2009 book, scholar Horst Kruse asserts that Max Gerlach was born in or near Berlin, Germany, and, as a young boy, he immigrated with his German parents to America.) and he served as an officer in the American Expeditionary Forces during World War I. He later became a gentleman bootlegger who lived like a millionaire in New York. Flaunting his new wealth, Gerlach threw lavish parties, never wore the same shirt twice, used the phrase "old sport", claimed to be educated at Oxford University, and fostered myths about himself, including that he was a relative of Wilhelm II. These details about Gerlach inspired Fitzgerald in his creation of Jay Gatsby. With the end of prohibition and the onset of the Great Depression, Gerlach lost his immense wealth. Living in reduced circumstances, he attempted suicide by shooting himself in the head in 1939, which blinded him. Gerlach died at October 18, 1958, at Bellevue Hospital, New York City. He was buried in a pine casket at Long Island National Cemetery.

"They're a rotten crowd," I shouted across the lawn. "You're worth the whole damn bunch put together."

I've always been glad I said that. It was the only compliment I ever gave him, because I disapproved of him from beginning to end.

— F. Scott Fitzgerald, Chapter VIII, The Great Gatsby

Mirroring Gerlach's background, Fitzgerald's fictional creation of James Gatz has a Germanic surname, and the character's father adheres to Lutheranism. These biographical details indicate Gatsby's family are recent German immigrants. Such origins preclude them from the status of Old Stock Americans.

Fitzgerald based many aspects of the lower-middle-class character on himself. "The whole idea of Gatsby", he later explained, "is the unfairness of a poor young man not being able to marry a girl with money. This theme comes up again and again because I lived it." In particular, Gatsby's obsession with Daisy Buchanan was based on Fitzgerald's romantic obsession with Chicago heiress Ginevra King.

After The Great Gatsby's publication in April 1925, Fitzgerald was dismayed that many literary critics misunderstood the novel, and he resented the fact that they failed to perceive the many parallels between his own life and his fictional character of Jay Gatsby; in particular, that both created a mythical version of themselves and attempted to live up to this legend.

In June 2025, Clare Hopkins, archivist at Trinity College, and Roger Michel, a fellow of the College, announced after searching historical records that the model for young Gatsby was “almost certainly” Robert P. T. Coffin, a poet.

== Fictional biography ==
Born circa 1890 (Note: Gatsby's birth year is revealed based on his first meeting with Dan Cody. Fitzgerald writes that Dan Cody went to sea in 1902 and, five years later in 1907, Cody first encountered Gatsby in Little Girl Bay at Lake Superior. At the time of this first encounter, Gatsby was 17-years-old. Consequently, Gatsby was born circa 1890 according to the novel's text.) to impoverished Lutheran farmers in rural North Dakota, James Gatz was a poor Midwesterner who briefly attended St. Olaf College, (Note: Reflecting Gatsby's Lutheran roots, his university St. Olaf College was founded in 1874 by Lutheran followers in southern Minnesota.) a small Lutheran institution in southern Minnesota. He dropped out after two weeks as he disliked working as a lowly janitor.

In 1907, a 17-year-old Gatz traveled to Lake Superior, where he met copper tycoon Dan Cody whose yacht Tuolomee (Note: "Tuolomee" is an alternate spelling for the Tuolumne River which emerges from Sierra Nevada mountain range. Ostensibly, copper tycoon Dan Cody, who made his fortune in "the Nevada silver fields", named his yacht after the legendary river which was once rich in silver and copper ore.) was anchored in Little Girl Bay. Introducing himself as Jay Gatsby, the ragged young man saved Cody's yacht from destruction by warning him of weather hazards. In gratitude, Cody invited him to join his yachting trip. Now known as Gatsby, he served as Cody's protégé over the next five years and voyaged around the world. When Cody died in 1912, he left Gatsby $25,000 in his will (equivalent to $834,052 in 2025), but Cody's mistress Ella Kaye cheated Gatsby out of the inheritance.

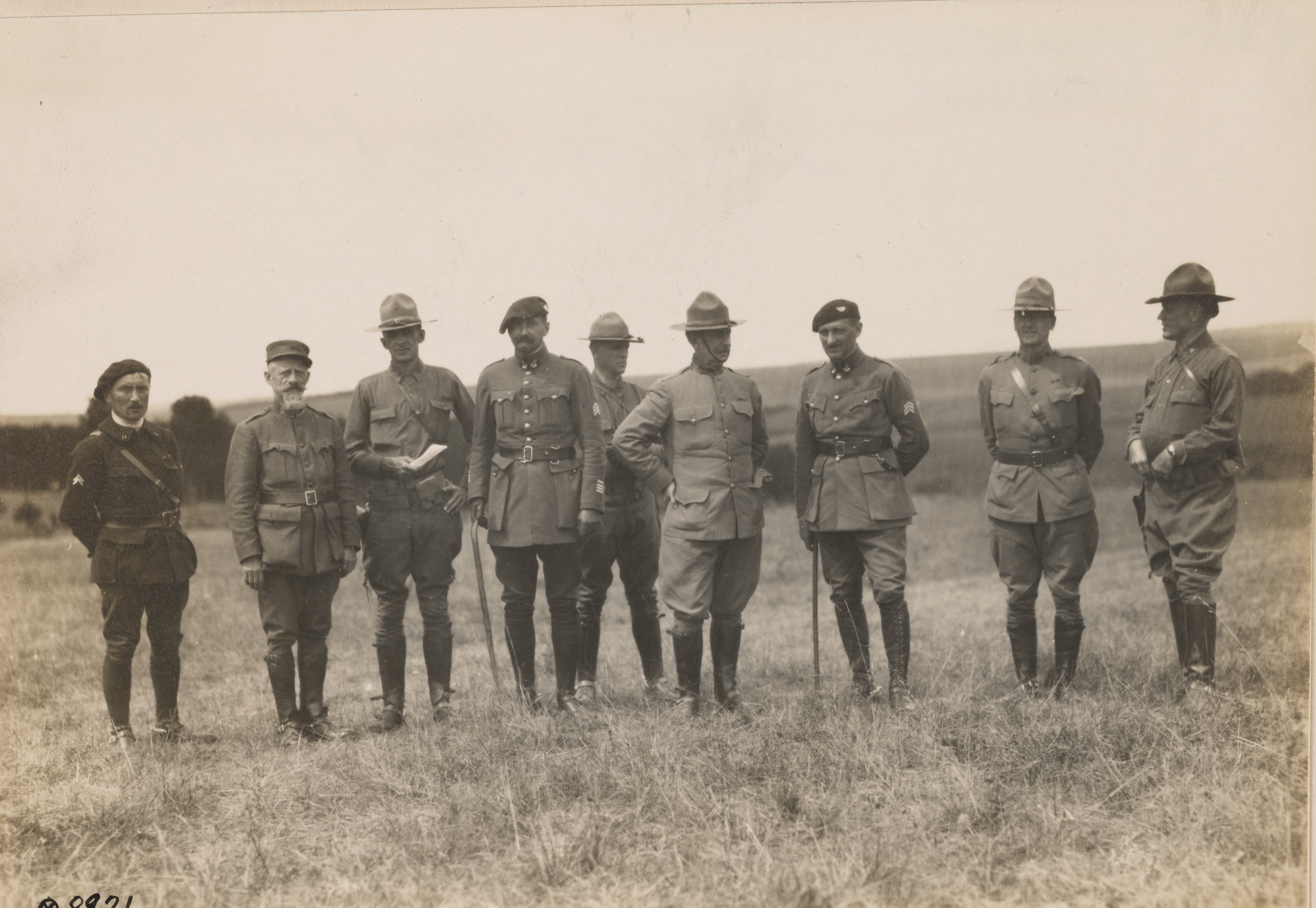
In the original 1925 text, Fitzgerald has Gatsby claim that he served in the U.S. 16th Infantry Regiment (pictured above) of the 1st Division. Fitzgerald subsequently revised the text and changed the unit to the U.S. 7th Infantry Regiment of the 3rd Division.

In 1917, after the United States' entrance into World War I, Gatsby joined the United States Army. During infantry training at Camp Taylor near Louisville, Kentucky, 27-year-old Gatsby met and fell deeply (Note: Gatsby's love for Daisy mirrors Fitzgerald's love for Ginevra King. Fitzgerald "was so smitten by King that for years he could not think of her without tears coming to his eyes".) in love with 18-year-old debutante Daisy Fay. Deployed to Europe with the American Expeditionary Forces, Gatsby attained the rank of Major in the U.S. 7th Infantry Regiment (Note: In the original 1925 text, Fitzgerald specified the "Sixteenth Infantry" of the "First Division". Fitzgerald corrected the text in subsequent editions to be the "Seventh Infantry" of the "Third Division".) of the 3rd Division and garnered decorations for extraordinary valor during the Meuse–Argonne offensive in 1918 from every Allied government, including the one of Montenegro, which King Nicholas I gave him the Order of Danilo, to "Major Jay Gatsby For Valour Extraordinary".

After the Allied Powers signed an armistice with Imperial Germany, Gatsby resided in the United Kingdom in 1919 where he briefly attended Trinity College, Oxford, for five months. (Note: After World War I, the U.S. military sent 2,000 American officers to study at Oxford University for four months. After the war, Fitzgerald sojourned in Oxford in 1921.) While there, he received a letter from Daisy, (Note: While Fitzgerald served in the United States Army, he received a letter from Ginevra King informing him that she had married Chicago businessman William "Bill" Mitchell. Soon after, a heart-broken Fitzgerald married Zelda Sayre, a Southern belle.) informing him that she had married Thomas "Tom" Buchanan, (Note: The novel's antagonist Thomas "Tom" Buchanan was primarily based upon William "Bill" Mitchell, the businessman who married Ginevra King, Fitzgerald's first love. Mitchell was a Chicagoan who loved polo. Also, like Ginevra's father Charles Garfield King whom Fitzgerald resented, Buchanan is an imperious Yale man and polo player from Lake Forest, Illinois.) a wealthy Chicago businessman. Gatsby departed the United Kingdom and traveled across the Atlantic Ocean to Louisville, but Daisy had already departed the city on her honeymoon. Undaunted by Daisy's marriage to Tom, Gatsby decided to become a man of wealth and influence in order to win Daisy's affection.

With the goal of earning immense wealth, a penniless Gatsby settled in New York City during the birth of the Jazz Age. (Note: After leaving the U.S. Army, Fitzgerald settled in New York City amid the ongoing societal transformation of the Jazz Age. Fitzgerald described the era as racing "along under its own power, served by great filling stations full of money". In Fitzgerald's eyes, the era was a morally permissive time when Americans became disillusioned with prevailing norms and obsessed with hedonism.) It is speculated that Gatsby took advantage of the newly enacted National Prohibition Act by making a fortune via bootlegging and built connections with organized crime figures such as Meyer Wolfsheim, (Note: The fictional character of Meyer Wolfsheim is an allusion to real-life Jewish gambler Arnold Rothstein, a New York crime kingpin whom Fitzgerald met once in undetermined circumstances. Rothstein was blamed for match fixing in the Black Sox Scandal that tainted the 1919 World Series.) a Jewish gambler who purportedly fixed the World Series in 1919.

In 1922, Gatsby purchased a Long Island estate in the nouveau riche area of West Egg, (Note: The "new money" peninsula of West Egg is an allusion to the Great Neck (Kings Point) region of Long Island, while the "old money" East Egg refers to Port Washington (Sands Point).) a town on the opposite side of Manhasset Bay from "old money" East Egg, where Daisy, Tom, and their three-year-old daughter Pammy lived. (Note: In 1922, Fitzgerald moved to Kings Point on Long Island where his marriage began to disintegrate. The quarrels between Fitzgerald and his wife Zelda grew intense, and they remarked to friends that their marriage would not last much longer. While staring across Long Island Sound, Fitzgerald continued to long for Ginevra King and hoped to be reunited with her. He later confided to his daughter that Ginevra "was the first girl I ever loved" and that he "faithfully avoided seeing her" to "keep the illusion perfect".) At his mansion, Gatsby hosted elaborate soirées with hot jazz music in an attempt to attract Daisy as a guest. With the help of Daisy's cousin and bond salesman Nick Carraway, Gatsby seduces her.

Only Gatsby, the man who gives his name to this book, was exempt from my reaction—Gatsby, who represented everything for which I have an unaffected scorn. If personality is an unbroken series of successful gestures, then there was something gorgeous about him, some heightened sensitivity to the promises of life.... It was an extraordinary gift for hope, a romantic readiness such as I have never found in any other person and which it is not likely I shall ever find again. No—Gatsby turned out all right at the end; it is what preyed on Gatsby, what foul dust floated in the wake of his dreams....

— F. Scott Fitzgerald, Chapter I, The Great Gatsby

Soon after, Gatsby accompanied Daisy and her husband to Midtown Manhattan in New York City in the company of Carraway and Daisy's friend Jordan Baker. (Note: Fitzgerald based Jordan Baker on Ginevra's friend Edith Cummings, a golfer known in the press as "The Fairway Flapper". The character's name is a play on two automobile brands, the Jordan Motor Car Company and the Baker Motor Vehicle, alluding to Jordan's "fast" reputation and the new freedom presented to flappers in 1920s America.) Tom borrowed Gatsby's yellow Rolls-Royce to drive into the city. He detoured to a filling station in the "valley of ashes", (Note: The "valley of ashes" was a landfill in Flushing Meadows, Queens. "In those empty spaces and graying heaps, part of which was known as the Corona Dumps, Fitzgerald found his perfect image for the callous and brutal betrayal of the incurably innocent Gatsby". The landfill was drained and became the site of the 1939 World's Fair.) a refuse dump on Long Island. The impoverished proprietor, George Wilson, voiced his concern that his wife Myrtle was having an affair with another man—unaware that Tom was the individual in question.

At a hotel suite in the twenty-story Plaza Hotel, Tom confronted Gatsby over his ongoing affair with his wife in the presence of Daisy, Nick, and Jordan. Gatsby urged Daisy to disavow her love for Tom and to declare that she married Tom for his money. Daisy asserted that she loved both Tom and Gatsby. Leaving the hotel, Daisy departed with Gatsby in his yellow Rolls-Royce while Tom departed in his car with Jordan and Nick.

While driving Gatsby's car on the return trip to East Egg, Daisy struck and killed—either intentionally or unintentionally—her husband's mistress Myrtle standing in the highway. At Daisy's house in East Egg, Gatsby assured Daisy he would take the blame if they were caught. The next day, Tom informed George that it was Gatsby's car that killed Myrtle. Visiting Gatsby's mansion, George killed Gatsby with a revolver while he was relaxing in his swimming pool and then committed suicide by shooting himself with the revolver.

Despite the many flappers and sheiks (Note: A "sheik" referred to young men in the Jazz Age who imitated the appearance and dress of iconic film star Rudolph Valentino. The female equivalent of a "sheik" was called a "sheba". Both "sheiks" and "shebas" were slightly older in age than the younger "flapper" generation who were children during World War I.) who frequented Gatsby's lavish parties on a weekly basis, only one reveler referred to as "Owl-Eyes" attended Gatsby's funeral. Also present at the funeral were bond salesman Nick Carraway and Gatsby's father Henry C. Gatz, who stated his pride in his son's achievement as a self-made millionaire.

== Critical analysis ==
=== American dream ===
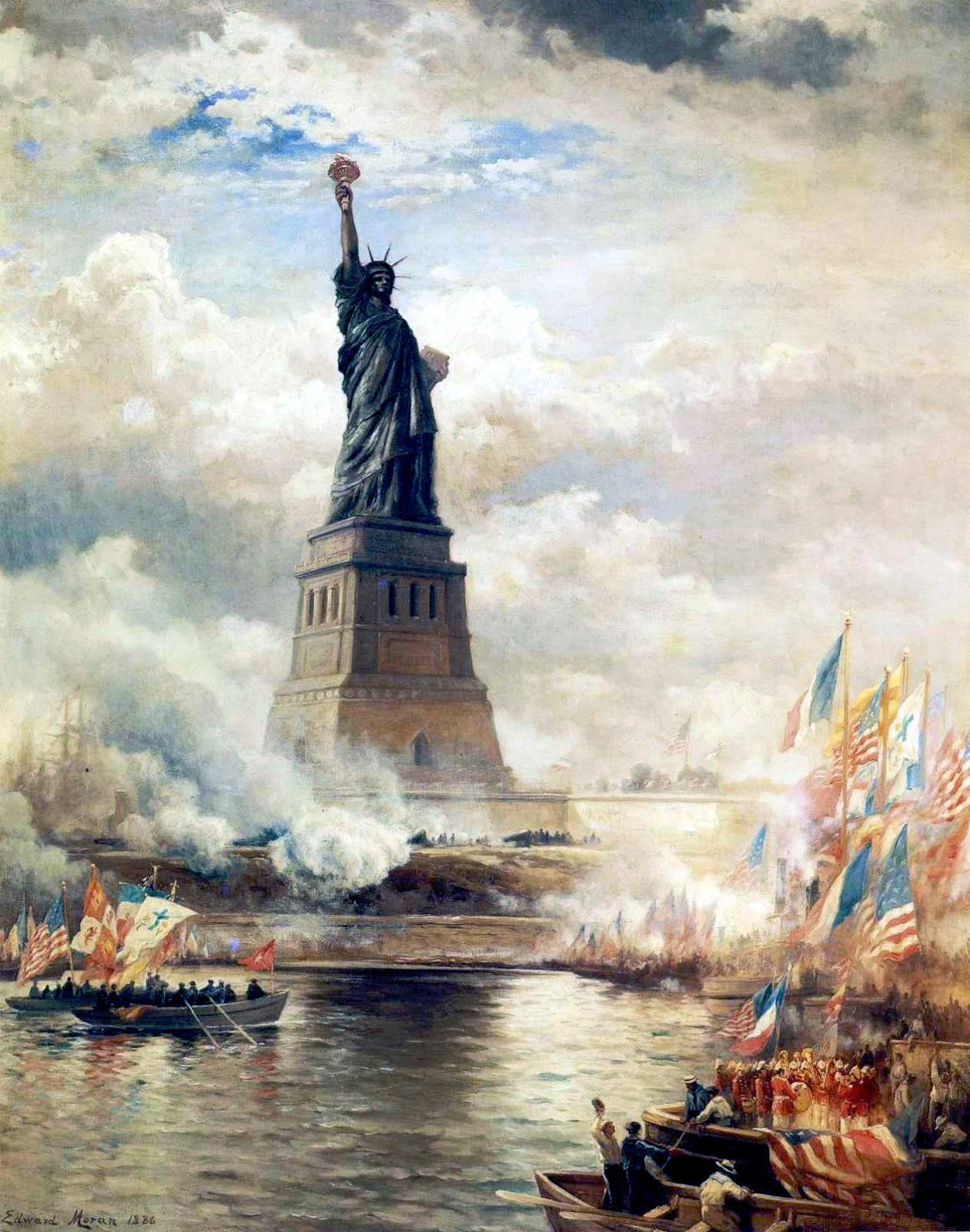
Jay Gatsby has been described by critics as a false prophet of the American Dream, often represented by the Statue of Liberty and signifying new opportunities in life.

The character of Jay Gatsby has become a cultural touchstone in American culture and is often invoked in popular discourse in the context of rags-to-riches grandeur. Commentator Chris Matthews views the character as personifying the eternal American striver, albeit one is keenly aware that his nouveau riche status is a detriment: "Gatsby needed more than money: he needed to be someone who had always had it.... this blind faith that he can retrofit his very existence to Daisy's specifications is the heart and soul of The Great Gatsby. It's the classic story of the fresh start, the second chance". However, in contrast to Gatsby as "the eternal American striver", folklorist Richard Dorson sees Gatsby as a radically different American archetype who rejects the traditional approach to earning wealth via hard work in favor of quick riches via bootlegging. In Dorson's view, Gatsby "rejected the Protestant ethic in favor of a much more extravagant form of ambition".

The character is often evoked as an indicator of social mobility; in particular, the likelihood of the average American amassing wealth and achieving the American dream. In 1951, biographer Arthur Mizener first interpreted the final pages of the novel in the context of the American dream. "The last two pages of the book," Mizener wrote in his biography The Far Side of Paradise, "make overt Gatsby's embodiment of the American dream as a whole by identifying his attitude with the awe of the Dutch sailors" when first glimpsing the New World. Mizener noted the dream's enchantment is qualified by Fitzgerald via his emphasis on its unreality. Mizener argued that Fitzgerald viewed the American dream itself as "ridiculous." Following the publication of his 1951 biography, Mizener popularized his interpretation of the novel as an explicit criticism of the American dream in a series of talks titled "The Great Gatsby and the American Dream."

Expanding upon Mizener's thesis, scholar Roger L. Pearson traced in 1970 the literary origins of this dream to Colonial America. The dream is the belief that every individual, regardless of their origins, may seek and achieve their desired goals, "be they political, monetary, or social. It is the literary expression of the concept of America: The land of opportunity". Echoing Mizener's earlier interpretation, Pearson suggests Gatsby serves as a false prophet of the American dream, and pursuing the dream only results in dissatisfaction for those who chase it, owing to its unattainability. In this context, the green light emanating across the Long Island Sound from Gatsby's house is interpreted as a symbol of Gatsby's unrealizable goal to win Daisy and, consequently, to achieve the American dream.

=== Societal outsider ===
Scholars posit that Gatsby's socio-economic ascent is deemed a threat not only due to his status as nouveau riche, but because he is perceived as an ethnic and societal outsider. Many of Fitzgerald's characters like Gatsby are defined by their sense of "otherness". Much of Fitzgerald's fiction is informed by his life experiences as a societal outsider. As a young boy growing up in the Midwest, he strained "to meet the standard of the rich people of St. Paul and Chicago among whom he had to grow up without ever having the money to compete with them". His wealthier neighbors viewed the young author's family to be lower-class, and his classmates at affluent institutions such as Newman and Princeton regarded him as a parvenu. His life as an expatriate in Europe and as a writer in Hollywood reinforced this lifelong sense of being an outsider.

Gatsby, whom Tom belittles as "Mr. Nobody from Nowhere", functions as a cipher because of his obscure origins, his unclear ethno-religious identity and his indeterminate class status. Much like Fitzgerald, Gatsby's ancestry precludes him from the coveted status of Old Stock Americans. His ascent is deemed a threat not only due to his status as nouveau riche, but because he is perceived as an outsider. Tom Buchanan's hostility towards Gatsby, who is the embodiment of "latest America", has been interpreted as partly embodying status anxieties typical of the 1920s era, involving anti-immigrant sentiment.

Because of such themes, scholars assert that Fitzgerald's fiction captures the perennial American experience, since it is a story about outsiders and those who resent them—whether such outsiders are newly arrived immigrants, the nouveau riche, or successful minorities. Since Americans living in the 1920s to the present must navigate a society with entrenched prejudices, Fitzgerald's depiction of resultant status anxieties and social conflict in his fiction has been highlighted by scholars as still enduringly relevant nearly a hundred years later.

Due to Gatsby's nouveau riche background and indeterminate class status, Fitzgerald viewed the character to be a contemporary Trimalchio, (Note: In 2002, over six decades after Fitzgerald's death, his earlier draft of the now-famous novel was published under the title Trimalchio: An Early Version of The Great Gatsby.) the crude upstart in Petronius's Satyricon, and even refers to Gatsby as Trimalchio once in the novel. Unlike Gatsby's spectacular parties, Trimalchio participated in the orgies he hosted, although the characters are otherwise similar. Intent on emphasizing the connection to Trimalchio, Fitzgerald entitled an earlier draft of the novel as Trimalchio in West Egg. Fitzgerald's editor, Maxwell Perkins, convinced the author to abandon his original title of Trimalchio in West Egg in favor of The Great Gatsby.

=== Self-mythologizing ===
The term "Gatsby" is also often used in the United States to refer to real-life figures who have reinvented themselves; in particular, wealthy individuals whose rise to prominence involved an element of deception or self-mythologizing. In a 1986 exposé on disgraced journalist R. Foster Winans who engaged in insider trading with stockbroker Peter N. Brant, the Seattle Post Intelligencer described Brant as "Winan's Gatsby". Brant had changed his name from Bornstein and said he was "a man who turned his back on his heritage and his family because he felt that being recognized as Jewish would be a detriment to his career".

=== Success at any cost ===
In more recent years, Gatsby's pursuit of success at any cost has been referenced as exemplifying the perils of environmental destruction in pursuit of self-interest. According to Kyle Keeler, Gatsby's quest for greater status manifests as self-centered, anthropocentric resource acquisition. Inspired by the predatory mining practices of his fictional mentor Dan Cody, Gatsby participates in extensive deforestation amid World War I and then undertakes bootlegging activities reliant upon exploiting South American agriculture. Gatsby conveniently ignores the wasteful devastation of the valley of ashes to pursue a consumerist lifestyle and exacerbates the wealth gap that became increasingly salient in 1920s America. For these reasons, Keeler argues that—while Gatsby's socioeconomic ascent and self-transformation depend upon these very factors—each one is nonetheless partially responsible for the ongoing ecological crisis.

== Musical leitmotif ==
"Rhapsody in Blue"
A 2018 cover of George Gershwin's Rhapsody in Blue by the United States Marine Band. This composition has been often linked with Fitzgerald's novel and the character of Jay Gatsby.

Both the character of Jay Gatsby and Fitzgerald's novel have been linked to George Gershwin's 1924 composition Rhapsody in Blue. Scholars assert that the fictional piece of music in Fitzgerald's novel titled Jazz History of the World, played by an orchestra when Nick first meets Gatsby, alludes to Gershwin's rhapsody, and the orchestra alludes to Paul Whiteman's band which first performed the work at Aeolian Hall in a February 1924 jazz concert titled "An Experiment in Modern Music". Whiteman repeated the concert at Carnegie Hall.

In the novel, Fitzgerald's description of the orchestra's unique instrumentation is nearly identical to Whiteman's iconic band. "We can be fairly certain that he is referring to Whiteman's band," wrote Gerald Early in his 1993 work The Lives of Jazz, "The orchestra is described as 'a whole pitful of oboes and trombones and saxophones and viols and cornets and piccolos, and low and high drums', a nearly exact description of the instrumentation of the Whiteman band". In an earlier draft, Fitzgerald added and then deleted a passage in which Nick describes in detail the jazz music played by this symphonic orchestra as embodying "the very essence of change". Stuart Mitchner highlights Nick's reaction to the opening glissando of Gershwin's rhapsody in this draft:

In an early draft of Gatsby that Fitzgerald originally called Trimalchio, after a character in the Satyricon, he refers to a piece of music played by a hired orchestra at the party where he first meets Gatsby. Titled The Jazz History of the World, an apparent allusion to Rhapsody in Blue, it began, as Nick hears it, "with a weird, spinning sound, followed by a series of interruptive notes which colored everything that came after them until before you knew it they became the theme... Long after the piece was over it went on and on in my head—whenever I think of that summer I can hear it yet."

Fitzgerald admired Gershwin's composition and opined that Rhapsody in Blue idealized jazz much as the youth-obsessed zeitgeist of the Jazz Age idealized youth. In subsequent decades, critics and scholars linked both the Jazz Age and Fitzgerald's works with Gershwin's rhapsody. In 1941, historian Peter Quennell opined that Fitzgerald's novel embodied "the sadness and the remote jauntiness of a Gershwin tune". Various writers such as the American playwright and critic Terry Teachout have likened George Gershwin himself to the character of Jay Gatsby due to his attempt to transcend his lower-class background, his abrupt meteoric success, and his early death while in his thirties. Playing upon the connection between Jay Gatsby and Gershwin's rhapsody, the 2013 film The Great Gatsby used Rhapsody in Blue as a dramatic leitmotif for the character.

== Portrayals ==
=== Stage ===
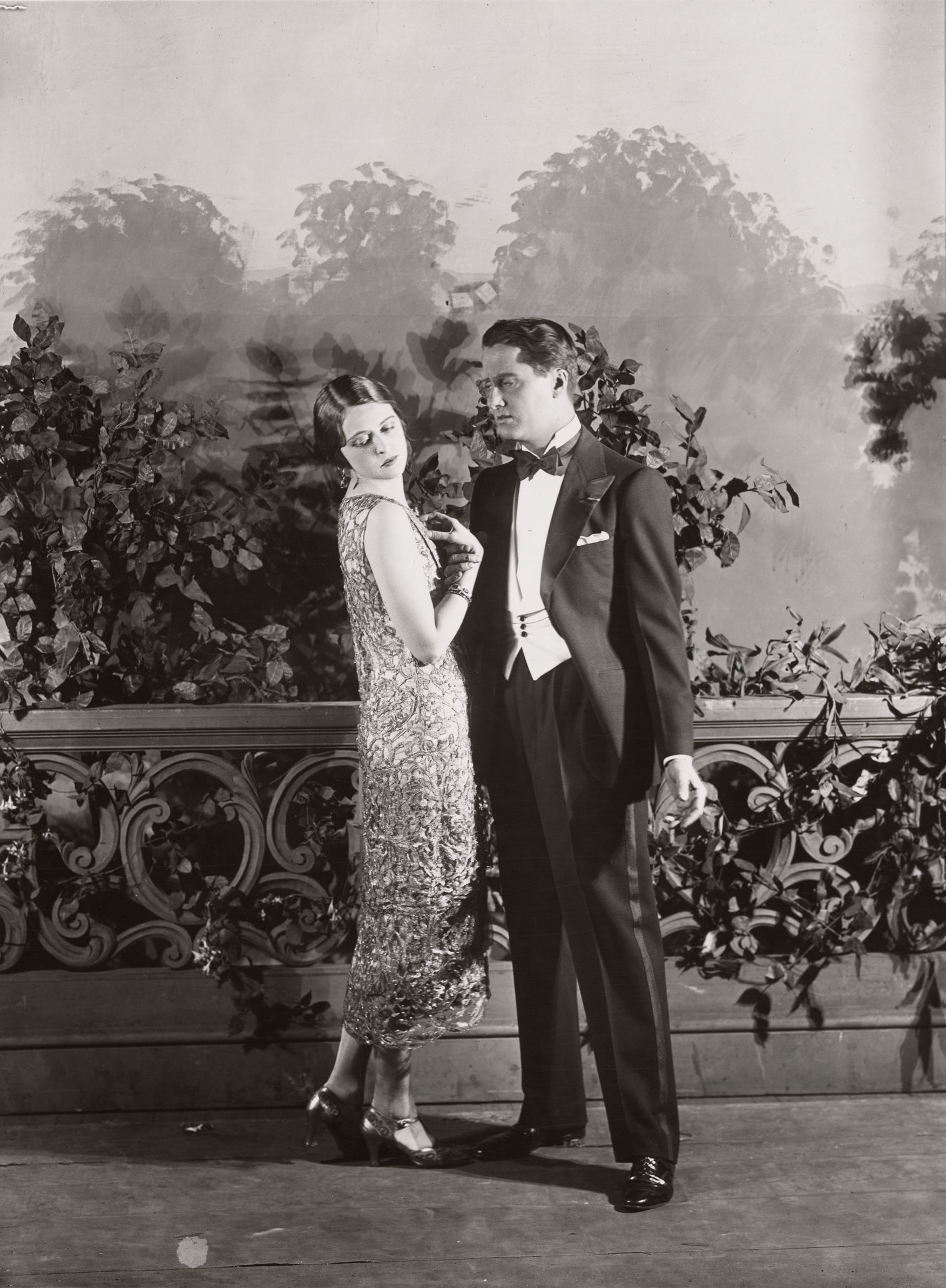
James Rennie as Gatsby in the first stage adaptation.

The first individual to portray the role of Jay Gatsby was 37-year-old James Rennie, a stage actor who headlined the 1926 Broadway adaptation of Fitzgerald's novel at the Ambassador Theatre in New York City. As "a handsome Canadian with a good voice", Rennie's portrayal met with rave reviews from theater critics. He repeated the role for 112 performances and then paused when he had to voyage to England due to an ailing family member.

After returning from England, Rennie continued to appear as Gatsby when the stage play embarked upon a successful nationwide tour. As Fitzgerald was vacationing in Europe at the time, he never saw the 1926 Broadway play, but his agent Harold Ober sent him telegrams which quoted the many positive reviews of the production.

In later stage adaptations, many actors have played Jay Gatsby. The Yale Dramatic Association performed a musical production of The Great Gatsby in May–June 1956. This was its first musical adaptation. In 1999, Jerry Hadley portrayed the character in John Harbison's operatic adaptation of the work performed at the New York Metropolitan Opera, and Lorenzo Pisoni portrayed Gatsby in Simon Levy's 2006 stage adaptation of Fitzgerald's novel.

In the fall of 2023, Jeremy Jordan played Gatsby in The Great Gatsby: A New Musical at Paper Mill Playhouse. The same production later transferred to Broadway in March 2024 where Jordan reprised the role. In January 2025, Ryan McCartan took over the role of Gatsby from Jordan and in April 2025, Jamie Muscato began starring as Gatsby in the West End production. In the summer of 2024, Isaac Cole Powell played the role of Gatsby in Florence Welch's musical Gatsby: An American Myth at the American Repertory Theatre.

=== Film ===
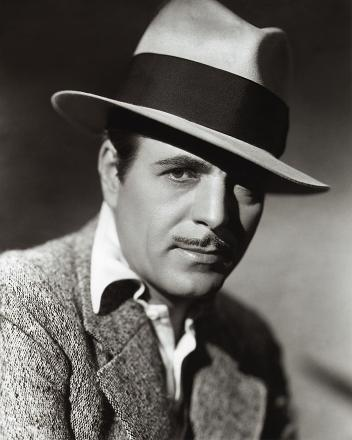
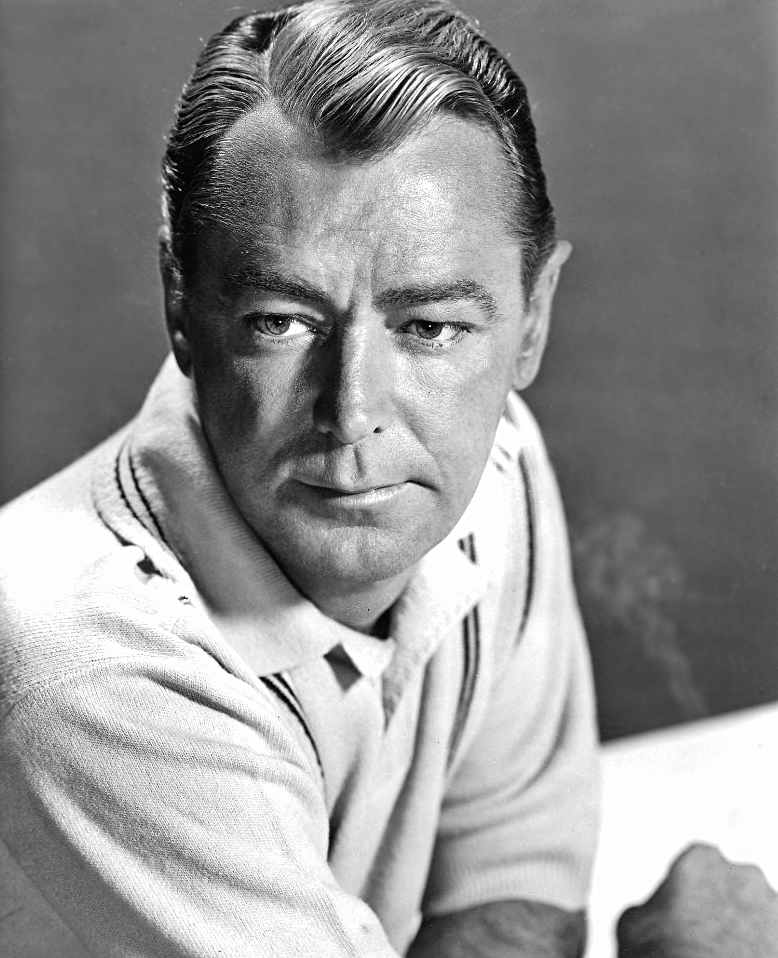
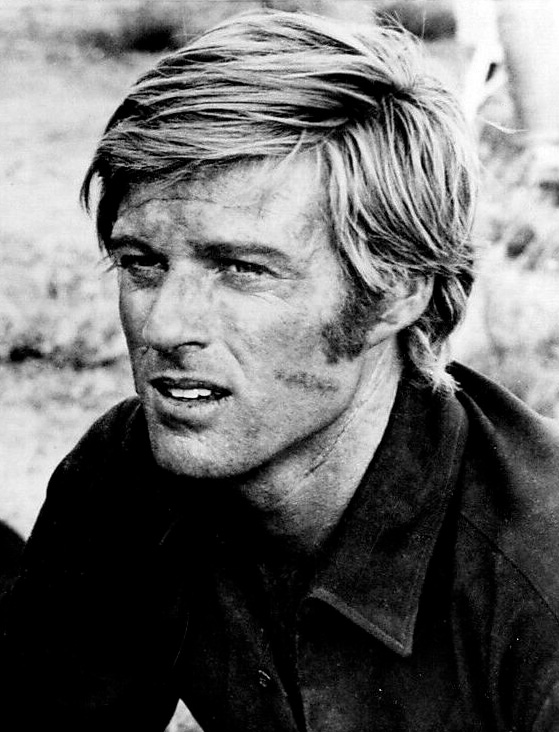
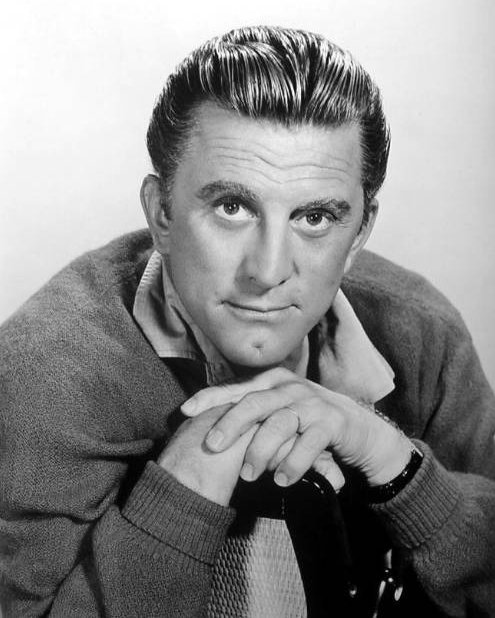
Actor Warner Baxter portrayed Jay Gatsby in the lost 1926 film. Alan Ladd and Robert Redford portrayed the character in the 1949 and 1974 film adaptations respectively. Kirk Douglas voiced the character in a 1950 radio adaptation.

A number of actors portrayed Jay Gatsby in cinematic adaptations of Fitzgerald's novel. Warner Baxter played the role in the lost 1926 silent film. Although the film received mixed reviews, Warner Baxter's portrayal of Gatsby was praised by several critics, although other critics found his acting to be overshadowed by Lois Wilson as Daisy. Purportedly, F. Scott Fitzgerald and his wife Zelda Sayre loathed the 1926 film adaptation of his novel and stormed out midway through a viewing of the film at a cinema. "We saw The Great Gatsby at the movies," Zelda wrote to an acquaintance in 1926, "It's ROTTEN and awful and terrible and we left."

Nearly a decade after Fitzgerald's death by a heart attack in 1940, Gatsby was portrayed by Oklahoma actor Alan Ladd in the 1949 film adaptation. Ladd's Gatsby was criticized by Bosley Crowther of The New York Times who felt that Ladd was overly solemn in the title role and gave the impression of "a patient and saturnine fellow who is plagued by a desperate love". The film's producer Richard Maibaum claimed that he cast Ladd as Gatsby based on the actor's rags-to-riches similarity to the character:

"I was in his house and he took me up to the second floor, where he had a wardrobe about as long as this room. He opened it up and there must have been hundreds of suits, sport jackets, slacks and suits. He looked at me and said, 'Not bad for an Okie kid, eh?'... I remembered when Gatsby took Daisy to show her his mansion, he also showed her his wardrobe and said, 'I've got a man in England who buys me clothes. He sends over a selection of things at the beginning of each season, spring and fall.' I said to myself, 'My God, he is the Great Gatsby.'"

In 1974, Robert Redford portrayed Gatsby in a film adaptation that year. Film critic Roger Ebert of the Chicago Sun-Times believed that Redford was "too substantial, too assured, even too handsome" as Gatsby and would have been better suited in the role of antagonist Tom Buchanan. Likewise, film critic Gene Siskel of the Chicago Tribune criticized Redford's interpretation of Gatsby as merely a "shallow pretty boy". Siskel declared there was little resemblance between Redford's suave portrayal and the ambitious parvenu in the novel.

In more recent decades, Leonardo DiCaprio played the role in director Baz Luhrmann's 2013 film adaptation. In a 2011 interview with Time magazine prior to the film's production, DiCaprio explained he was attracted to the role of Gatsby due to the idea of portraying "a man who came from absolutely nothing, who created himself solely from his own imagination. Gatsby's one of those iconic characters because he can be interpreted in so many ways: a hopeless romantic, a completely obsessed wacko or a dangerous gangster intent on clinging to wealth".

=== Television ===
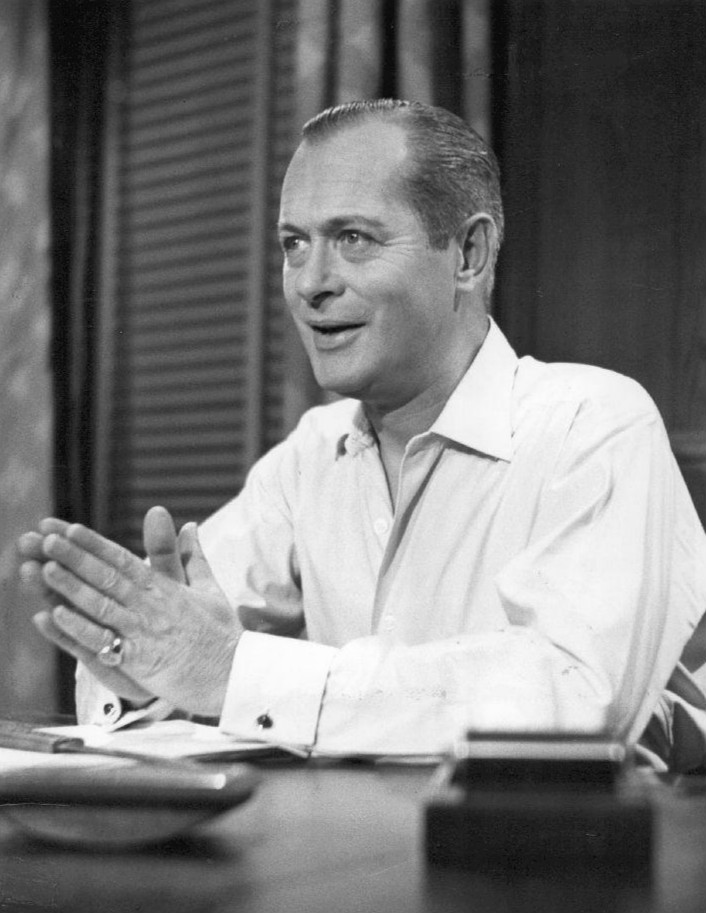
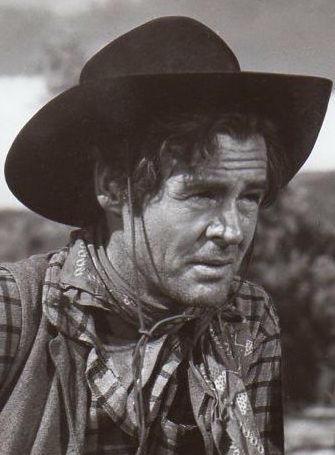
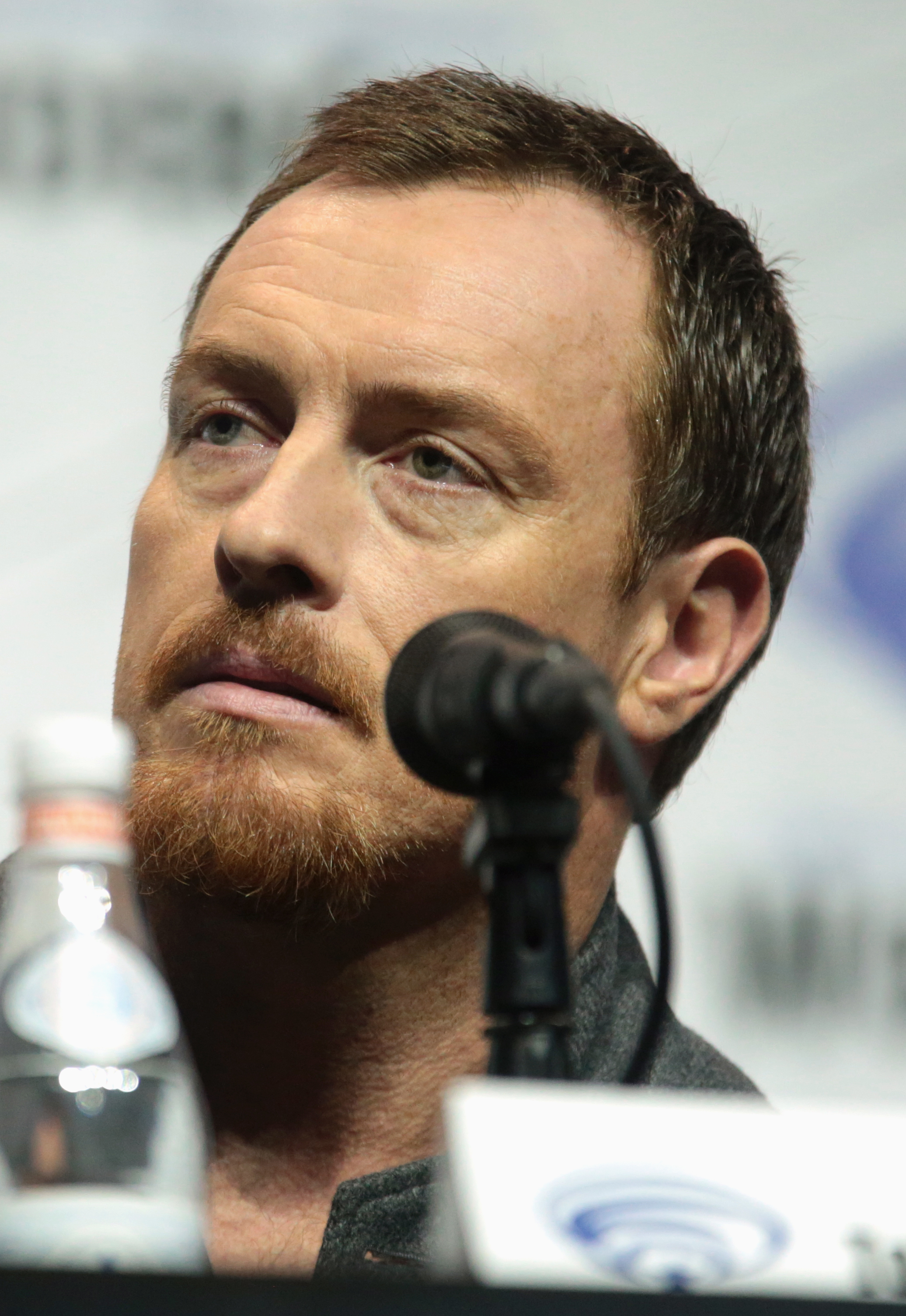
Robert Montgomery, Robert Ryan, and Toby Stephens have portrayed Jay Gatsby in various television adaptations of Fitzgerald's novel.

The character of Jay Gatsby has appeared many times in television adaptations. The first was in May 1955 as an NBC episode for Robert Montgomery Presents starring Robert Montgomery as Gatsby. In May 1958, CBS filmed the novel as an episode of Playhouse 90, also titled The Great Gatsby, which starred 50-year-old Robert Ryan as the 32-year-old Jay Gatsby.

Toby Stephens later portrayed the character in a 2000 television film adaptation. In a 2001 review of the television film, The New York Times criticized Stephens' performance as "so rough around the edges, so patently an up-from-the-street poseur that no one could fall for his stories for a second" and his "blunt performance turns Gatsby's entrancing smile into a suspicious smirk".

In The Simpsons episode "The Great Phatsby", Mr. Burns assumes Jay Gatsby's role, with the storyline spoofing the 2013 film adaptation. In the Family Guy episode "High School English", Brian Griffin is portrayed as Gatsby.

=== Radio ===
Kirk Douglas starred as Gatsby in an adaptation broadcast on CBS Family Hour of Stars on January 1, 1950, and Andrew Scott played Gatsby in the 2012 two-part BBC Radio 4 Classic Serial production. Ncuti Gatwa played Gatsby in the BBC Radio 3 adaptation Gatsby in Harlem in 2025 (written by Roy Williams), for which he won Best Performance in the inaugural British Audio Awards 2025.

=== List ===
List of actors
Year	Title	Actor	Format	Distributor	Rotten Tomatoes	Metacritic
1926	The Great Gatsby	James Rennie	Stage	Broadway (Ambassador Theatre)	—N/a	—N/a
1926	The Great Gatsby	Warner Baxter	Film	Paramount Pictures	55% (22 reviews)	—N/a
1949	The Great Gatsby	Alan Ladd	Film	Paramount Pictures	33% (9 reviews)	—N/a
1950	The Great Gatsby	Kirk Douglas	Radio	CBS Family Hour of Stars	—N/a	—N/a
1955	The Great Gatsby	Robert Montgomery	Television	NBC Robert Montgomery Presents	—N/a	—N/a
1958	The Great Gatsby	Robert Ryan	Television	CBS Playhouse 90	—N/a	—N/a
1974	The Great Gatsby	Robert Redford	Film	Paramount Pictures	39% (36 reviews)	43 (5 reviews)
1999	The Great Gatsby	Jerry Hadley	Opera	New York Metropolitan Opera	—N/a	—N/a
2000	The Great Gatsby	Toby Stephens	Television	A&E Television Networks	—N/a	—N/a
2006	The Great Gatsby	Lorenzo Pisoni	Stage	Guthrie Theater	—N/a	—N/a
2012	The Great Gatsby	Andrew Scott	Radio	BBC Radio 4	—N/a	—N/a
2013	The Great Gatsby	Leonardo DiCaprio	Film	Warner Bros. Pictures	48% (301 reviews)	55 (45 reviews)
2023	The Great Gatsby	Jeremy Jordan	Musical	Broadway (Paper Mill Playhouse/Broadway Theatre)	—N/a	—N/a
2024	Gatsby: An American Myth	Isaac Cole Powell	Musical	American Repertory Theater	—N/a	—N/a
2025	Gatsby in Harlem	Ncuti Gatwa	Radio	BBC Radio 3		

== See also ==
- Gatsby (sandwich), a South African submarine sandwich named after the character
- Great Gatsby curve, a measure of economic inequality and social mobility
- Adaptations and portrayals of F. Scott Fitzgerald
