= The Great Gatsby (2000 film) =

2000 television film by Robert Markowitz

- DVD cover
- Genre: Romantic drama
- Based on: The Great Gatsby by F. Scott Fitzgerald
- Screenplay by: John J. McLaughlin
- Directed by: Robert Markowitz
- Starring: Toby Stephens; Mira Sorvino; Paul Rudd; Martin Donovan
- Music by: Carl Davis
- Countries of origin: United Kingdom; United States
- Original language: English

Production
- Executive producers: Tom Thayer; Delia Fine; Jane Tranter; Antony Root
- Producers: Craig McNeil; David Roessell
- Production location: Montreal
- Cinematography: Guy Dufaux
- Editor: David Beatty
- Running time: 90 minutes
- Production companies: Granada Entertainment; Traveler's Rest Films; BBC Films
- Budget: $5 million

Original release
- Network: BBC
- Release: March 29, 2000
- Network: A&E
- Release: January 14, 2001

The Great Gatsby is a 2000 historical romantic drama television film based on the 1925 novel by F. Scott Fitzgerald. It was directed by Robert Markowitz, written by John J. McLaughlin, and stars Toby Stephens in the title role of Jay Gatsby, Mira Sorvino as Daisy Buchanan, Paul Rudd as Nick Carraway, Martin Donovan as Tom Buchanan, Francie Swift as Jordan Baker, Heather Goldenhersh as Myrtle Wilson, and Matt Malloy as Klipspringer. The film aired in the United Kingdom on BBC on March 29, 2000, and in the United States on A&E on January 14, 2001.

Hampered by a limited $5 million budget and hastily filmed in Montreal, Canada, to reduce costs, the A&E television adaptation suffered from low production values, and the critical response to its broadcast was overwhelmingly negative. The New York Times dismissed it as "flat-footed," The Guardian described it as "uninspired," and The Boston Globe savaged it as "mediocre". The performances of Toby Stephens as Jay Gatsby and Mira Sorvino as Daisy Buchanan were particularly ill-received by a number of critics, although Paul Rudd's performance as Nick Carraway garnered praise.

== Plot ==
Nick Carraway is a young bond salesman who rents a cottage on Long Island, New York, near the mansion of the wealthy and reclusive Jay Gatsby. Nick gets to know Gatsby, who was a poor man named Gatz before he left to fight in World War I. Gatsby fell in love with a beautiful woman from a wealthy family, Daisy. When he returned, Gatz was determined to prove himself worthy to win her hand, even though Daisy had by this time married the socially prominent Tom Buchanan. Gatsby has yet to give up on his romantic dream and enlists Nick, who is distantly related to Daisy, in his plan.

== Cast ==
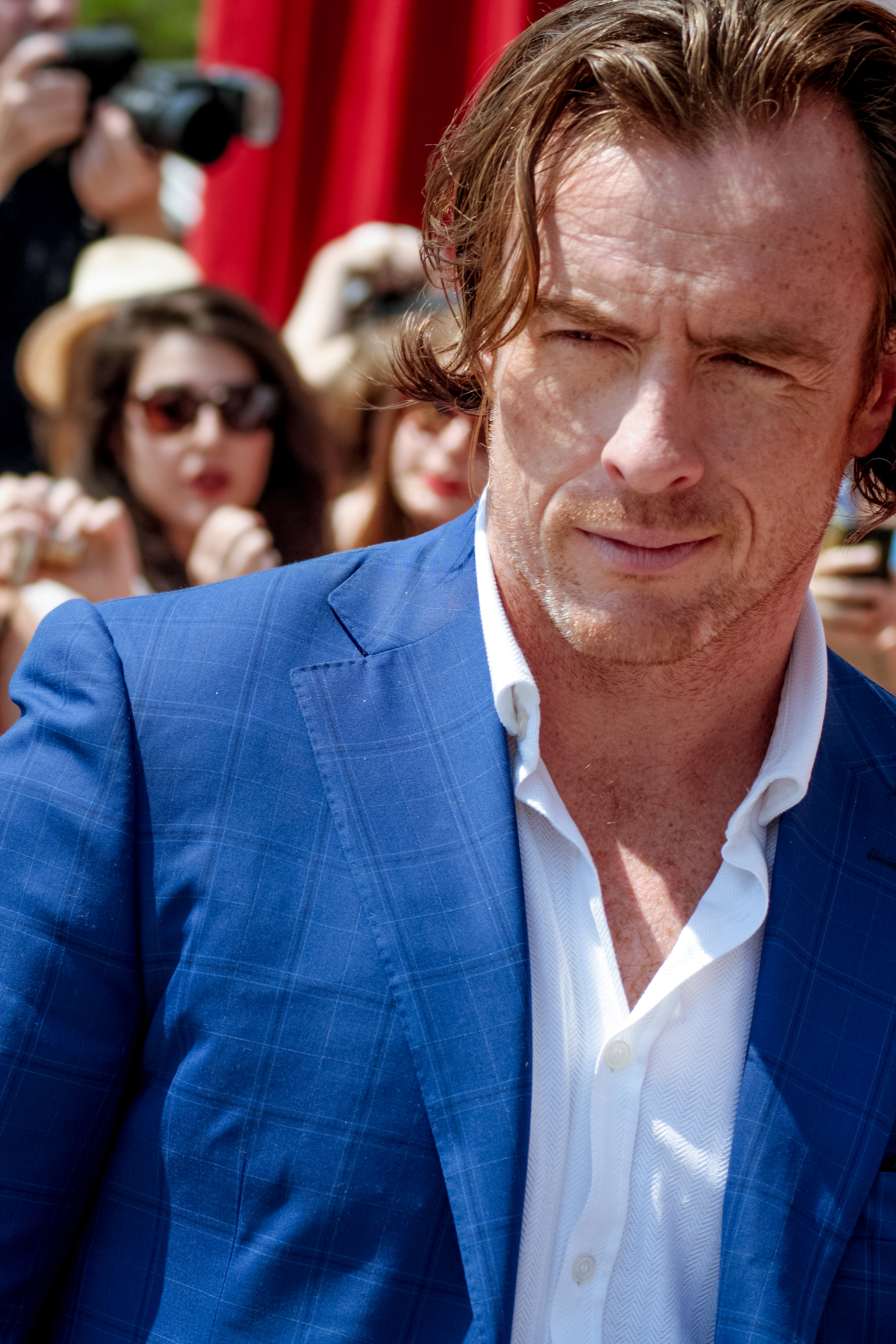
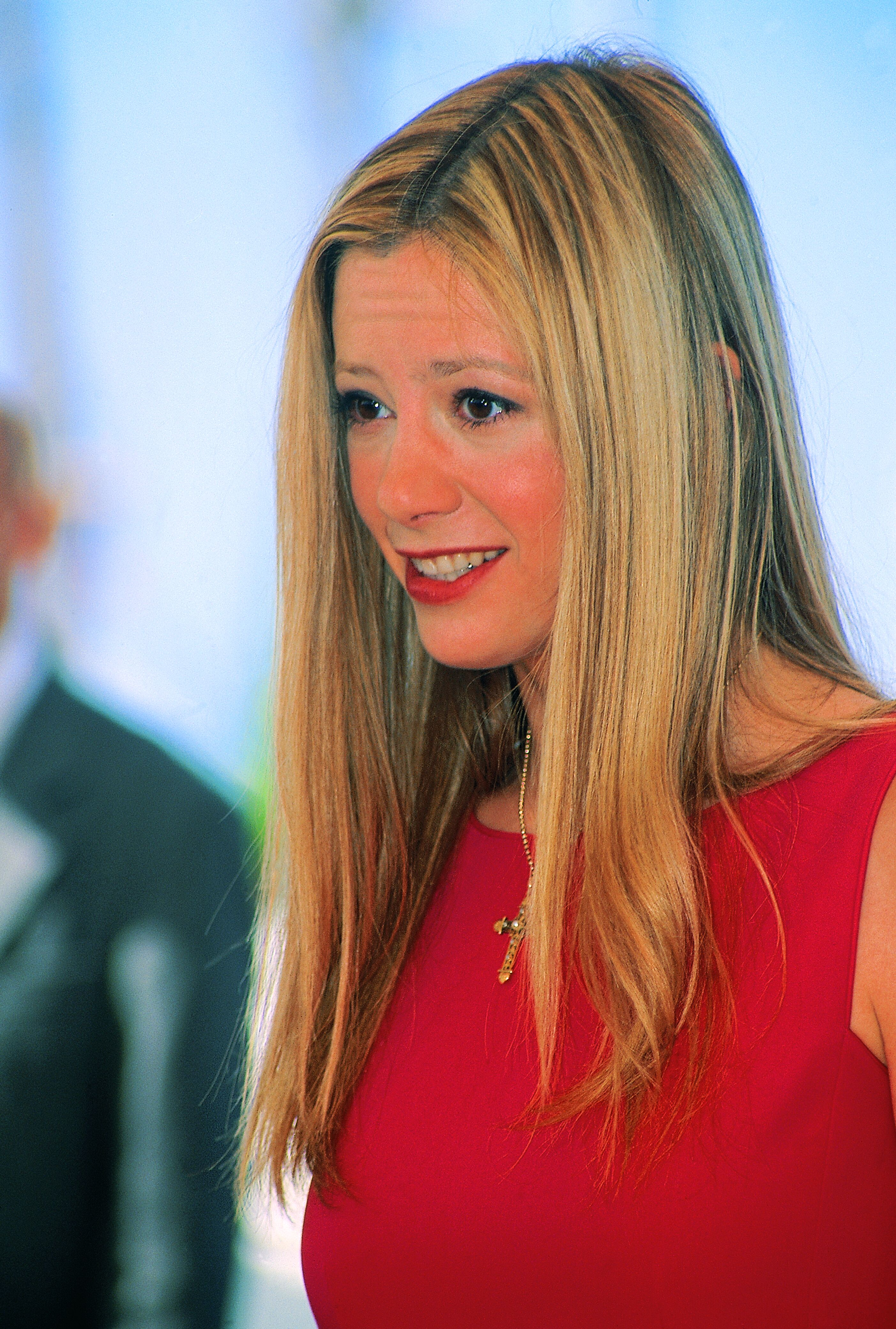
Toby Stephens portrayed Jay Gatsby, and Mira Sorvino portrayed Daisy Buchanan.
- Paul Rudd as Nick Carraway – A Yale graduate and World War I veteran from the Midwest. Working as a bond salesman after the war, Carraway moves to West Egg to live near his cousin Daisy Buchanan. In West Egg, Carraway meets his next-door neighbour, Jay Gatsby. In awe of Gatsby's wealth, history, and lifestyle, Carraway befriends him and immediately becomes even more intrigued with his mysterious neighbor.
- Toby Stephens as Jay Gatsby – Originally born James "Jimmy" Gatz from North Dakota, Gatsby was a major in World War I, where he first fell in love with Daisy Buchanan. However, being poor, Daisy was married to another man, Tom Buchanan. From this point on, Gatsby dedicated his life to making himself suitable enough for Daisy and to finally win her love. From being a soldier to a businessman, with his new riches, Gatsby buys a mansion in West Egg directly across the water from Daisy's home in order to keep a watchful eye on the love of his life. Gatsby is known for throwing extravagant parties at his mansion, hoping that one day Daisy might show up and he could win her back with his immense new wealth. Fitzgerald based the character on bootlegger and former World War I officer, Max Gerlach. A military veteran, Gerlach became a self-made millionaire due to his bootlegging endeavors and was fond of using the phrase "old sport" in his letters to Fitzgerald.
- Mira Sorvino as Daisy Buchanan – A warm, flirtatious, and selfish married woman from South Kentucky. Daisy is married to polo player Tom Buchanan, and they have one daughter together. Through her cousin Nick Carraway, who develops a friendship with Jay Gatsby, Daisy reunites with her former lover. Her reunion with Gatsby arouses her husband's jealousy and suspicion. Fitzgerald based the character on Ginevra King, a Chicago socialite and heiress.
- Martin Donovan as Tom Buchanan – The husband of Daisy Buchanan. Unlike Gatsby, Tom's family background and riches were enough to win over Daisy and marry her. Despite his relationship with Daisy, Tom becomes involved in an extramarital affair with Myrtle Wilson. Buchanan has certain parallels with William "Bill" Mitchell, the Chicago businessman who married Ginevra King. Buchanan and Mitchell were both Chicagoans with an interest in polo. Also, like Ginevra's father Charles King whom Fitzgerald resented, Buchanan is an imperious Yale man and polo player from Lake Forest, Illinois.
- Francie Swift as Jordan Baker – Coming from Louisville, the character of Jordan Baker plays the main love interest of Nick Carraway. It is also revealed that she had a past with Daisy Buchanan and was aware of her whole love affair, past and present, with Jay Gatsby. Fitzgerald based Jordan on Ginevra King's friend Edith Cummings, a premier amateur golfer known in the press as "The Fairway Flapper".
- Heather Goldenhersh as Myrtle Wilson – The impoverished wife of a car mechanic and garage owner. She desires to be sophisticated and wealthy, coming off as tacky to the narrator, Nick Carraway. Having been unhappily married to her husband for two years now because of his lack of wealth and social status, Myrtle has an affair with Tom Buchanan.

== Production ==
Initially planned to be shot in Ottawa, the production ended up shooting in Montreal, Quebec, as Ottawa was not equipped to handle the production on short notice. The television film was shot in less than thirty days in September 1999 with a budget of $5 million. The film was made in collaboration by the A&E Cable Network in the United States, and Granada Productions in Great Britain. It was directed by Robert Markowitz from a teleplay by John J. McLaughlin. The music score was by Carl Davis and the cinematography by Guy Dufaux. The production was designed by Taavo Soodor.

== Marketing ==
A&E Network launched a widespread marketing campaign for their 2001 programming, with a major focus on The Great Gatsby. For Gatsby, they hosted national and local sweepstakes sponsored by US Airways and Waterford Crystal and tied them into high schools, colleges, and libraries. Displays were reportedly placed in 12,000 libraries nationwide, and A&E held acting contests at 23,000 high schools and colleges. An in-flight featurette, The Making of the Great Gatsby, played on US Airways during the holiday season.

== Reception ==
The Great Gatsby television adaptation received negative reviews upon its broadcast debut. On Rotten Tomatoes, the film holds a 27% approval rating, and on IMDb it has a score of 5.7/10. The New York Times dismissed it as "flat-footed," The Guardian described it as "uninspired," and The Boston Globe savaged it as "mediocre". In his review in The Boston Globe, critic Matthew Gilbert described the film as a crass attempt by "television execs hoping to mine yet another literary classic for its built-in audience."

Caryn James of the New York Times praised Paul Rudd as "brilliant" in the role of Nick Carraway, but dismissed the film as disappointing and wrote the "film might have survived its pedestrian style, but it can't survive a leaden Gatsby." In her review, James criticized Toby Stephens' performance as "so rough around the edges, so patently an up-from-the-street poseur that no one could fall for his stories for a second" and his "blunt performance turns Gatsby's entrancing smile into a suspicious smirk".

Mira Sorvino's performance as Daisy Buchanan was roundly criticized. Natasha Joffe of The Guardian wrote that Sorvino was an abysmal Daisy "whose voice is supposed to be full of money, but is just moany. Why would Gatsby love her? She looks like a drowned goose and her hats are like they've been made out of old pants." Similarly, John Crook of The Fremont Tribune wrote that Sorvino was "seriously miscast as Daisy".
