= The Great Gatsby (Playhouse 90) =

- Playhouse 90 episodes
- Robert Ryan and Jeanne Crain in The Great Gatsby
- Episode nos.: Season 2 Episodes 39
- Directed by: Franklin Schaffner
- Written by: David Shaw (adaptation), F. Scott Fitzgerald (novel)
- Original air date: June 26, 1958
- Running time: 1:28:27

Guest appearances
- Jeanne Crain as Daisy Buchanan; Robert Ryan as Jay Gatsby; Rod Taylor as Nick Carraway

Episode chronology
← Previous "A Town Has Turned to Dust"	Next → "A Bitter Heritage"

"The Great Gatsby" is an American television play broadcast live on June 26, 1958, as part of the second season of the CBS television series Playhouse 90. David Shaw wrote the teleplay, adapted from the novel of the same name by F. Scott Fitzgerald. Franklin Schaffner directed. Jeanne Crain, Robert Ryan, and Rod Taylor starred, and Rod Serling was the host.

== Plot ==
An adaptation of F. Scott Fitzgerald's 1925 novel about a talented young man from a poor background who strives to win the unattainable rich girl. Set on Long Island, the wealthy Daisy Buchanan falls in love with Jay Gatsby, an Army captain. While Gatsby fights in the war, Daisy is pressured by her family to marry Tom Buchanan, a man of their social set. Five years pass, and Gatsby now owns a huge estate on Long Island. Daisy's cousin, Nick Carraway, rents Gatsby's gate house for the summer. Gatsby hosts lavish parties and seeks to reconnect with Daisy.

== Cast ==
Rod Serling hosted the show, and Dick Joyce was the announcer. The following cast received screen credit for their performances.

- Robert Ryan as Jay Gatsby
- Jeanne Crain as Daisy Buchanan
- Virginia Grey as Myrtle Wilson
- Rod Taylor as Nick Carraway
- Patricia Barry as Jordan Baker
- Phillip Reed as Tom Buchanan
- Barry Atwater as George Wilson
- Val Avery as Joe
- Eugenia Paul as Lucille
- Doris Lloyd as Mrs. Fay
- Nelson Welch as Gordon

== Production ==
Martin Manulis was the producer, and Franklin Schaffner directed. David Shaw wrote the teleplay as an adaptation of F. Scott Fitzgerald's novel. The production was broadcast live on June 26, 1958, from Television City in Los Angeles. It was part of the second season of Playhouse 90, an anthology television series that was voted "the greatest television series of all time" in a 1970 poll of television editors.

The program's sponsors were Ban roll-on deodorant, Ipana toothpaste, Kleenex, Camel cigarettes, and Pillsbury.

== Reception ==
UPI television critic William Ewald called it "a muddler". He found that it "had very little to do with Scott Fitzgerald's story." Although the plot and the relationships of the major characters were "pretty true", it lacked Fitzgerald's bite in depiction of wealth and drained the irony from the story. Ewald wrote that the television adaptation was "not bad in its own way -- it had a swift, logical plot, the sets had the sumptuous smell of Long Island in the 1920s, and Robert Ryan and Jeanne Crain ... turned in jobs that suited the script." One headline for Ewald's review proclaimed: "TV 'Gatsby' Fraud, Not Fitzgerald's 'Great Gatsby'". Another said: "Great Gatsby' Neither 'Great' Nor 'Gatsby'".
