= Max Gerlach =

Literary model for The Great Gatsby

- Surveillance photograph of bootlegger Max Gerlach clandestinely taken on July 8, 1915, by the New York City Police Department
- Born: Max Stork Gerlach; October 12, 1885; Berlin, Brandenburg, Prussia, Germany
- Died: October 18, 1958 (aged 73); New York City, U.S.
- Resting place: Long Island National Cemetery
- Occupation: Bootlegger

Max von Gerlach (born Max Stork Gerlach; October 12, 1885 – October 18, 1958) was a German-born American bootlegger and an acquaintance of American writer F. Scott Fitzgerald. After serving as an officer in the American Expeditionary Force during World War I, Gerlach became a gentleman bootlegger who operated speakeasies on behalf of gambler Arnold Rothstein in New York City.

Flaunting his newfound wealth as a bootlegger in New York, Gerlach threw lavish parties, never wore the same shirt twice, used the phrase "old sport", claimed to be educated at Oxford University, and fostered outlandish myths about himself, including that he was a relation of the German Kaiser. Many of these details about Gerlach inspired Fitzgerald's creation of Jay Gatsby, the titular character of his novel The Great Gatsby.

With the end of prohibition and the onset of the Great Depression in the early 1930s, Gerlach lost his immense wealth. Living in reduced circumstances, he attempted suicide by shooting himself in the head in 1939. Blinded after his suicide attempt, he lived as a helpless invalid for many years. Gerlach died on October 18, 1958, at Bellevue Hospital in New York City. He was buried in a pine casket at Long Island National Cemetery.

== Early life and military service ==
According to research, Gerlach was presumably born in or near Berlin, Germany, in 1885. His father was Ferdinand Gerlach, a secretary to Frederick III in the Ministry of the Royal House of Hohenzollern. His father died in 1887 or 1888 while serving in the Royal Prussian Army. (Although a marriage document from Königsberg listing his full name, parents names, and date of birth makes him alive in 1895). After his father's death, his mother Elizabeth Gerlach married a merchant named Andreas Stork.

In 1894, Max, his mother, and his step-father immigrated to the United States and settled in Yonkers, New York. In 1900, a fifteen-year-old Gerlach worked on a motor boat as a machinist where he traveled to Mexico. He later worked as a mechanic and car salesman in Cuba and other locales. By 1910, a 25-year-old Max had returned to the United States and become a merchant on Second Avenue in Manhattan.

In 1918, following the United States' entrance into World War I, Gerlach applied for a major's commission in the Ordnance Department of the U.S. Army. Although he applied to be a major, he was commissioned as a first lieutenant and managed military logistics for the American Expeditionary Forces in Hoboken, New Jersey. After the armistice with Imperial Germany, Gerlach was honorably discharged. Immediately after his discharge, Gerlach often traveled between Cuba and the United States during which time he likely became involved in illegally importing alcohol during Prohibition. He soon became a gentleman bootlegger who lived like a millionaire in New York.

== Bootlegging and meeting Fitzgerald ==
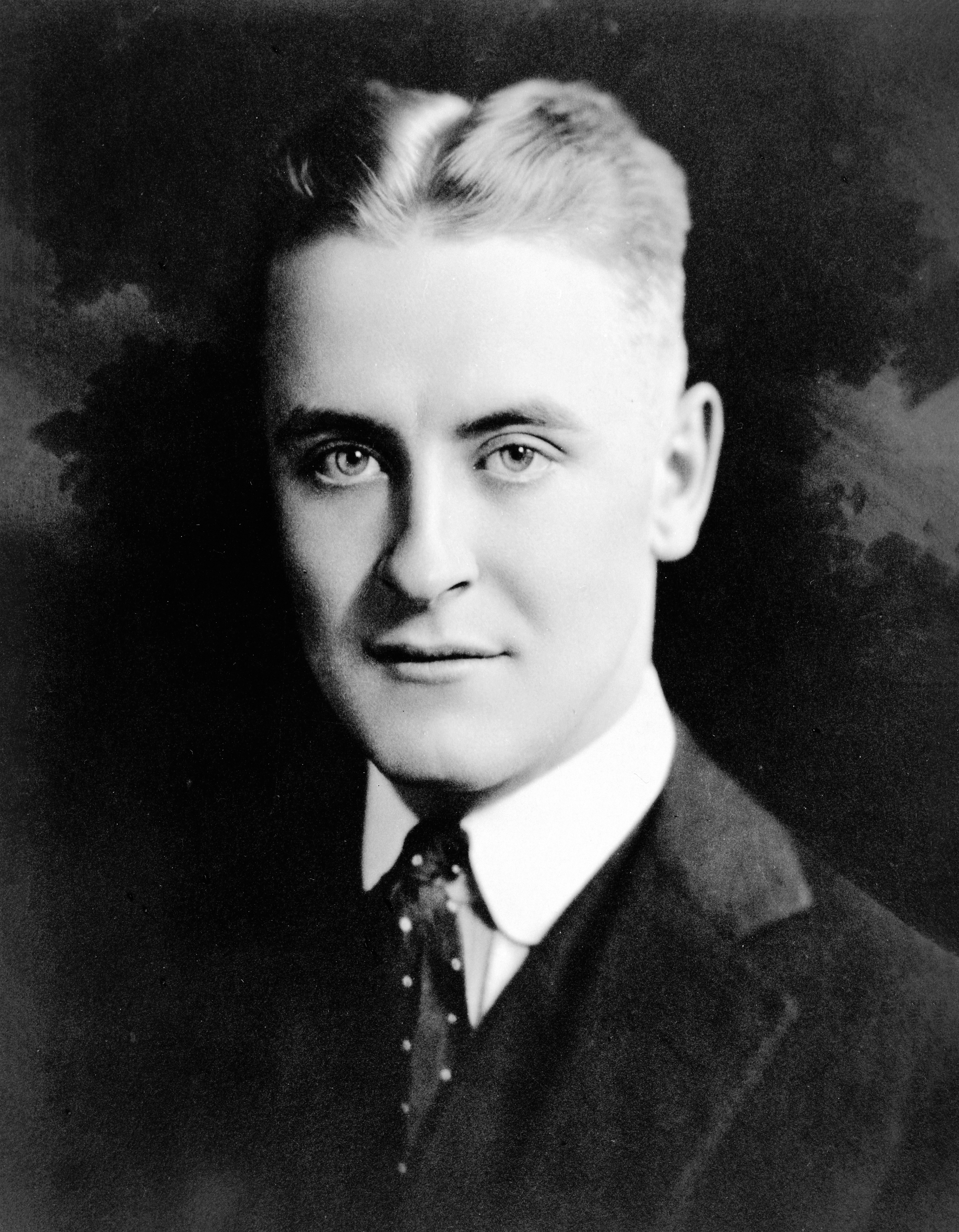
F. Scott Fitzgerald partly based the character of Jay Gatsby on his wealthy neighbor Max Gerlach.

While bootlegging in New York City, Gerlach befriended writer F. Scott Fitzgerald. Both Fitzgerald's wife Zelda Fitzgerald and his friend Edmund Wilson stated that Gerlach was Fitzgerald's neighbor at some point during the author's sojourn in New York state. Initially, Fitzgerald scholars were uncertain where the two met and could not find property records for a Long Island estate with Gerlach's name.

In 2022, scholars discovered evidence that Gerlach operated a Manhattan speakeasy in 1927 in a building owned by Arnold Rothstein, the gambler and kingpin of the Jewish Mob upon whom Fitzgerald based the character of Meyer Wolfsheim in his novel, The Great Gatsby. In a letter written to Corey Ford at MGM in 1937, Fitzgerald stated he met Rothstein in New York City in unspecified circumstances.

According to a Variety magazine article dated July 27, 1927, New York police raided Gerlach's posh speakeasy located at 51 West 58th Street. Gerlach's speakeasy was located a few hundred feet from the Plaza Hotel where Fitzgerald and his wife Zelda frequently stayed when visiting Manhattan, and Gerlach's well-heeled patrons were reported by the press to be "quite exclusive".

In his interactions with Fitzgerald, Gerlach claimed to have been born in the United States to a German immigrant family. Flaunting his new wealth, Gerlach threw lavish parties, never wore the same shirt twice, used the phrase "old sport", claimed to be educated at Oxford University, and fostered myths about himself, including that he was a relation of the German Kaiser. Fitzgerald used these details for the character of Jay Gatsby.

== Later life ==
=== Loss of wealth and suicide attempt ===
In Summer 1927, police arrested Gerlach and charged him with violating the Volstead Act by selling alcohol. The outcome of the case is unknown, but he later appeared in records at a prestigious address on 22 East 38th Street in Manhattan. With the end of prohibition and the onset of the Great Depression, Gerlach lost his immense wealth. After losing his wealth Gerlach found work as a car salesman. Living in reduced circumstances, he attempted suicide by shooting himself in the head in 1939. Blinded after his suicide attempt, he lived as a helpless invalid for many years.

=== Final years and death ===
How are you and the family, old sport?

— Max Gerlach, Letter to F. Scott Fitzgerald

After Fitzgerald's death in December 1940 and after the belated popularity of his novel The Great Gatsby in the late 1940s, a blind Gerlach attempted to contact Fitzgerald's first biographer Arthur Mizener in 1951. He attempted to communicate to Mizener that he had inspired the character of Jay Gatsby. However, Mizener wrongly believed that Gatsby was an entirely fictional character and refused to speak with Gerlach.

Gerlach died on October 18, 1958, at Bellevue Hospital in New York City. He was buried in a pine casket at Long Island National Cemetery. Following Gerlach's death, scholars discovered correspondence between Gerlach and Fitzgerald. In one letter, Gerlach had written, "How are you and the family, old sport?" Further statements made by Zelda Fitzgerald and Fitzgerald's friend Edmund Wilson confirmed that Gerlach had primarily inspired the fictional character, including a statement by Wilson that Fitzgerald had visited Gerlach's home and had been impressed by its splendor. Several years before her death, Zelda stated "that Gatsby was based on 'a neighbor named Von Guerlach or something who was said to be General Pershing's nephew and was in trouble over bootlegging'".
