= Family Hour of Stars =

American radio anthology series (1948–1950)

Family Hour of Stars is an American radio anthology series that was broadcast on CBS beginning on October 3, 1948, and ending on February 26, 1950. It was also known as The Prudential Family Hour of Stars.

== Background ==
Family Hour of Stars, which was sponsored by the Prudential Insurance Company of America, replaced The Prudential Family Hour, a program that featured concert music but also included dramatic segments about composers' lives. The musical program had been on for seven years and had "a gradual erosion of audience". The sponsor began Family Hour of Stars "with no break in continuity" a week after the concert show ended.

== Overview ==
Family Hour of Stars initially featured Humphrey Bogart, Bette Davis, Gregory Peck, Ginger Rogers, Barbara Stanwyck, and Robert Taylor as its core group of stars. Those actors were absent during summer episodes in 1949, when the broadcasts used "free-lance 'less expensive' talent". John Lund was featured in the first summer program, on June 5, 1949, with Ava Gardner, Richard Widmark, and Diana Lynn in the next three episodes. In October 1949 the show had a new core group of stars: Dana Andrews, Ronald Colman, Irene Dunne, and Loretta Young. In January 1950, Colman left because he began a program of his own; James Stewart replaced him. Some episodes featured guest stars. Frank Goss and Truman Bradley were the announcers, and Carmen Dragon led the orchestra.

== Episodes ==
Partial List of Episodes of Family Hour of Stars
Date	Episode	Star
October 3, 1948	"John Jones, Vice President"	Gregory Peck
October 24, 1948	"The Flowering Thorn"	Stanwyck
November 7, 1948	"The Deeper Shadow"	Ray Milland
February 6, 1949	"The Trouble With Luke Casper"	Van Johnson
February 13, 1949	"Appointment in Springfield"	Rogers
May 29, 1949	"Luck Is a Lady"	Milland
July 3, 1949	"One Life to Lose"	Kirk Douglas
July 31, 1949	"To Mary, With Love"	Herbert Marshall
August 14, 1949	"The Wookey"	Edmund Gwenn
August 28, 1949	"The Firebrand"	Victor Jory
October 16, 1949	"One Sunday Afternoon"	Andrews
October 30, 1949	"Winterset"	Douglas
November 27, 1949	"The Barretts of Wimpole Street"	Dunne
January 15, 1950	"George Washington Slept Here"	Andrews

== Production ==
Benton & Bowles (B & B) had overall control of production, but when the show was launched B & B farmed out responsibility to MCA Inc. Effective with the June 5, 1949, episode, B & B took direct control of production from MCA. Ken Burton was the producer. Directors included Murray Bolen and Jack Johnstone. Writers included Jean Holloway. The half-hour program was broadcast on Sundays at 6 p.m. Eastern Time. Prudential ended Family Hour of Stars, "planning to save some money by the cancellation". Combined costs of time and talent exceeded $20,000 per week. The show was replaced by My Favorite Husband.

== Critical response ==
Radio historian John Dunning wrote in the reference book On the Air: The Encyclopedia of Old-Time Radio that Family Hour of Stars "had much the same sound as half a dozen 'Hollywood glitter' shows then on the air". He added that even with occasional guest stars and original stories (rather than adaptations), "the sound was the same, due to the glut of such programming on CBS and the other networks as well."
