= Barbara Matera =

Barbara Matera may refer to:

- Barbara Matera (politician) (born 1981), Italian television announcer, actress and politician
- Barbara Matera (costume designer) (1929–2001), American costume and clothing designer
