= The Great Gatsby (1974 film) =

1974 film directed by Jack Clayton

- Theatrical release poster
- Directed by: Jack Clayton
- Screenplay by: Francis Ford Coppola
- Based on: The Great Gatsby 1925 novel by F. Scott Fitzgerald; The Great Gatsby 1926 play by Owen Davis
- Produced by: David Merrick
- Starring: Robert Redford; Mia Farrow; Karen Black; Scott Wilson; Sam Waterston; Lois Chiles; Bruce Dern
- Cinematography: Douglas Slocombe
- Edited by: Tom Priestley
- Music by: Nelson Riddle
- Production company: Newdon Productions
- Distributed by: Paramount Pictures
- Release date: March 29, 1974
- Running time: 146 minutes
- Country: United States
- Language: English
- Budget: $7 million
- Box office: $26.5 million

The Great Gatsby is a 1974 American historical romantic drama film based on the 1925 novel by F. Scott Fitzgerald. The film was directed by Jack Clayton, produced by David Merrick, and written by Francis Ford Coppola. It stars Robert Redford, Mia Farrow, Sam Waterston, Bruce Dern, and Karen Black. The plot concerns the interactions of writer Nick Carraway with enigmatic millionaire Jay Gatsby (Redford) and Gatsby's obsession to reunite with his former lover, Daisy Buchanan (Farrow), amid the riotous parties of the Jazz Age on Long Island near New York City.

The Great Gatsby was preceded by 1926 and 1949 films of the same name. Despite a mixed reception by critics, the 1974 film grossed over $26 million against a $7 million budget. Coppola later stated that the film failed to follow his screenplay. In 2013, a fourth film adaptation was produced.

== Plot ==
Nick Carraway pilots his boat across the harbor to his cousin Daisy and her husband Tom's mansion in East Egg. While there, he learns Tom and Daisy's marriage is troubled and Tom is having an affair with a woman in New York. Nick lives in a small cottage in West Egg, next to a mysterious tycoon named Gatsby, a former Oxford student and decorated World War I veteran, who regularly throws extravagant parties at his home.

Tom takes Nick to meet his mistress, Myrtle, who is married to George Wilson, an automotive mechanic. George needs to purchase a vehicle from Tom, but Tom is there only to draw Myrtle to his city apartment. There she taunts him with Daisy's name.

Back on Long Island, Daisy wants to set Nick up with her friend, Jordan, a professional golfer. When Nick and Jordan attend a party at Gatsby's home, Nick is invited to meet Gatsby privately, who asks him to lunch the following day.

At lunch, Nick meets Gatsby's business partner Meyer Wolfsheim, a Jewish gangster and gambler who rigged the 1919 World Series. The following day, Jordan appears at Nick's work and asks him to invite Daisy to his house so that Gatsby can meet with her.

Gatsby surprises Daisy at lunch. It is revealed that Gatsby and Daisy were once lovers, though she would not marry him because he was poor.

Daisy and Gatsby have an affair, which soon becomes obvious. While Tom and Daisy entertain Gatsby, Jordan, and Nick at their home, Daisy, on a hot summer day, proposes they go into the city as a diversion. At the Plaza Hotel, Gatsby and Daisy reveal their affair. Gatsby wants Daisy to admit she never loved Tom. She does not and drives off in Gatsby's car. The others return separately to the island.

During the drive home, Daisy hits Myrtle when Myrtle runs into the street. Believing that Gatsby killed his wife, George later goes to Gatsby's mansion and fatally shoots him. George then commits suicide.

Nick holds a funeral for Gatsby. There he meets the man's father and learns Gatsby's original name is "Gatz". No one else attends the funeral.

Afterward, Daisy and Tom continue with their lives as though nothing occurred. Nick breaks up with Jordan and moves back to the Midwest, frustrated with Eastern ways. He laments Gatsby's inability to escape his past.

== Cast ==
- Robert Redford as Jay Gatsby
- Mia Farrow as Daisy Buchanan
- Bruce Dern as Tom Buchanan
- Sam Waterston as Nick Carraway
- Karen Black as Myrtle Wilson, George's wife
- Scott Wilson as George Wilson, Myrtle's husband
- Lois Chiles as Jordan Baker
- Edward Herrmann as Ewing Klipspringer
- Howard Da Silva as Meyer Wolfsheim
- Kathryn Leigh Scott as Catherine, Myrtle's sister
- Regina Baff as Miss Baedecker
- Vincent Schiavelli as Thin Man
- Roberts Blossom as Mr. Gatz
- Beth Porter as Mrs. McKee
- Patsy Kensit as Pammy Buchanan

== Production ==
=== Development ===
Producer Robert Evans planned on making The Great Gatsby with his wife Ali MacGraw as Daisy as it was her favorite book. Evans hired Truman Capote to write a script that turned out to be unusable despite Capote's $300,000 fee. Evans made a deal with Broadway producer David Merrick as producer of the movie, and it was Merrick who bought the rights for between $350,000 and $500,000 from F. Scott Fitzgerald's daughter, Frances "Scottie" Fitzgerald.

=== Casting ===
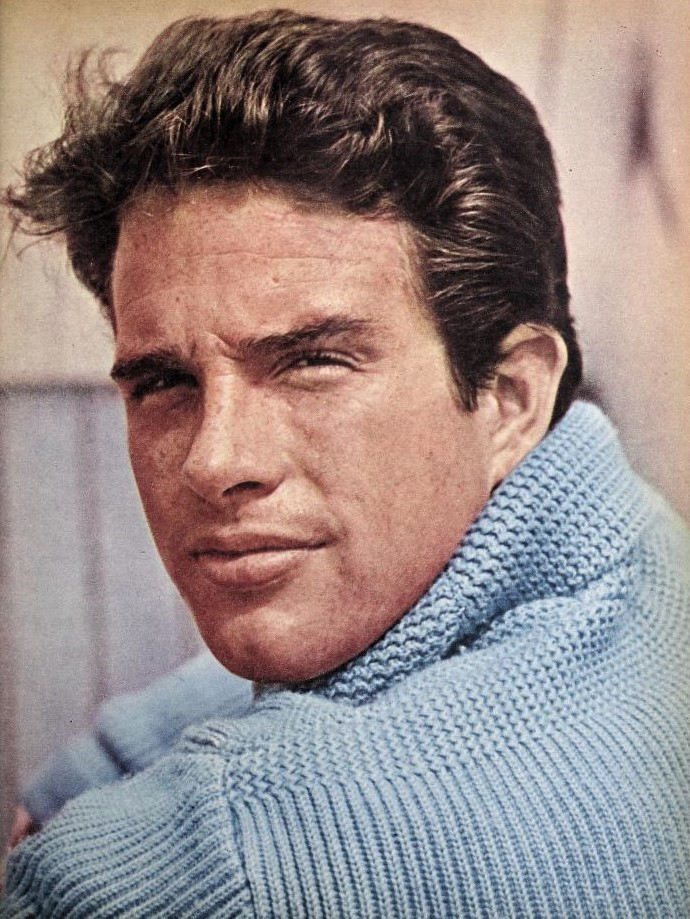
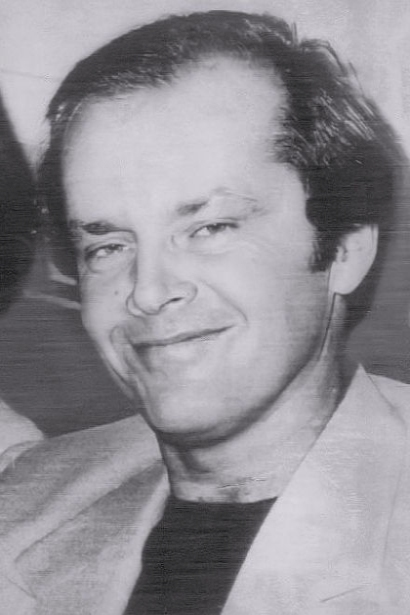
Warren Beatty (left) and Jack Nicholson (right) both wished to play the role of Jay Gatsby but refused to play opposite Ali MacGraw as Daisy Buchanan.

The film's producer Robert Evans originally sought Warren Beatty for the role of Jay Gatsby, but Beatty turned him down, reluctant to act opposite MacGraw. With Beatty out, Evans offered the role to Jack Nicholson, but Nicholson also reportedly was wary of acting with MacGraw and was unable to make a financial deal.

Evans then sought 49-year-old Marlon Brando for the role coveted by then 36-year-old Robert Redford, who broke through to superstardom in 1973, the year The Great Gatsby remake was lensed.

Robert Redford campaigned for the role of Jay Gatsby, but Evans rebuffed him on the incorrect belief that Fitzgerald's text specified Gatsby had dark hair. Director Jack Clayton upbraided Evans for his lack of knowledge about the book and convinced him to cast Redford. "I began to think Evans never read the book," Clayton recalled. "Sure, he liked the idea of doing a Fitzgerald [movie], but he didn't know the text. Nowhere in it does Fitzgerald say Gatsby's hair is dark." During this time, Ali MacGraw subsequently lost the part of Daisy after she left Evans for Steve McQueen. MacGraw and McQueen approached producer Merrick through their agents and offered themselves as a package, but McQueen was turned down on the grounds that Redford already was cast. Without McQueen as her co-star, she dropped the project, although Evans claimed it was he himself who terminated her participation in the movie.

It was full of money—that was the inexhaustible charm that rose and fell in it, the jingle of it, the cymbals' song of it... High in a white palace the king's daughter, the golden girl...

— F. Scott Fitzgerald, on the voice of Daisy

After Ali MacGraw's departure from the project, Candice Bergen and Katharine Ross reportedly were offered the role of Daisy. Tuesday Weld was also considered. Faye Dunaway wanted the role so badly that she obtained a screen test, but was still passed over by Clayton.

Clayton opted to cast Mia Farrow. Her godfather was the legendary film director George Cukor, who was historically linked to the book, having directed the work's original Broadway stage adaptation in 1926, as a young man beginning his career. Farrow had sent a cable to producer Evans asking him to consider her for the role; director Jack Clayton found agreement regarding this casting.

=== Screenplay ===
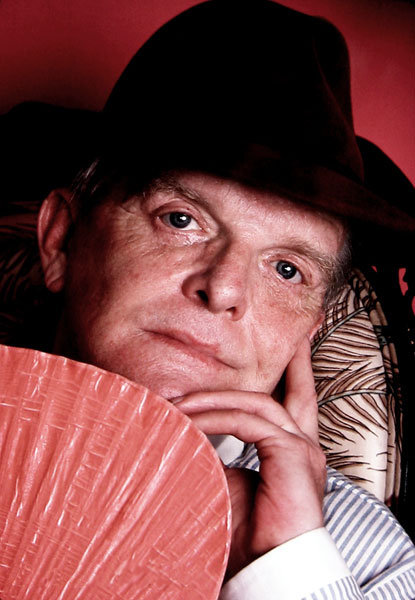
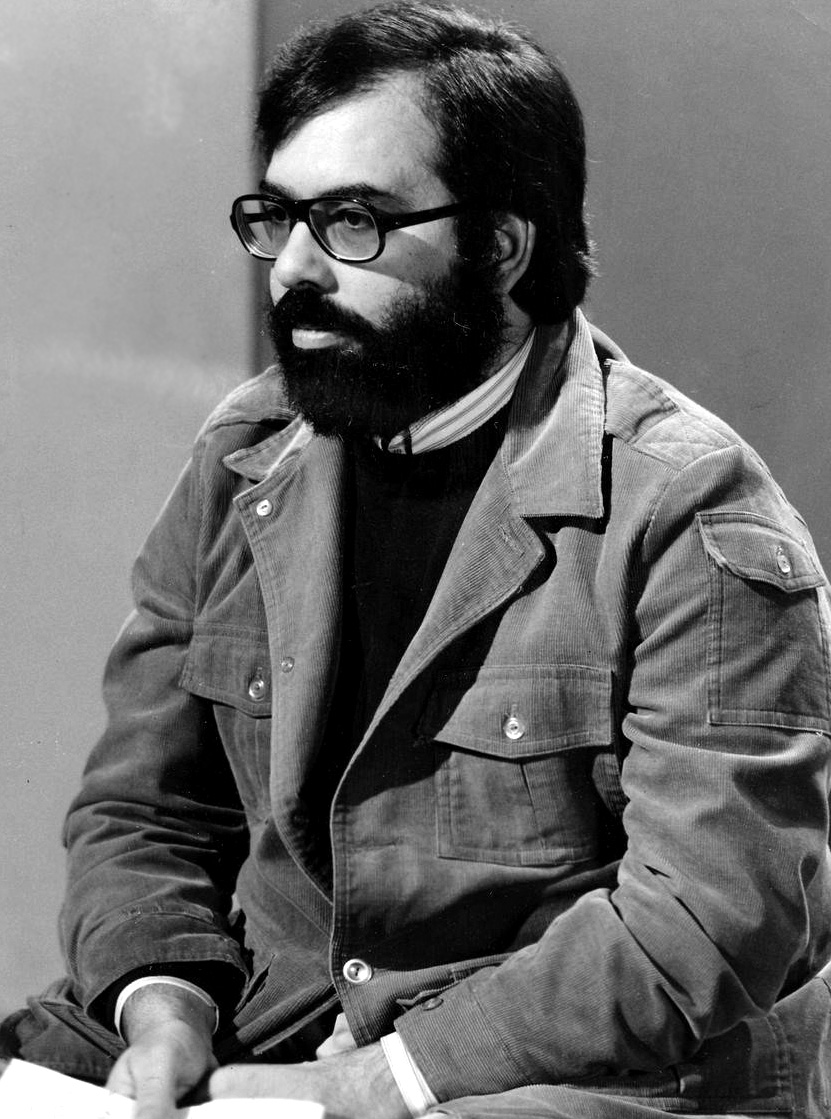
Truman Capote (left) wrote the first draft of the screenplay which producer Robert Evans rejected. Francis Ford Coppola (right) wrote a second screenplay, although director Jack Clayton purportedly ignored much of its nuance.

Truman Capote was the original screenwriter but he was replaced by Francis Ford Coppola. Coppola had just finished directing The Godfather, but was unsure of its commercial reception and he needed the money. He got the job on the recommendation of Robert Redford, who had liked a rewrite Coppola did on The Way We Were. Coppola "had read Gatsby but wasn't familiar with it." He checked himself into a hotel room in Paris (Oscar Wilde's old room) and started. He later recalled:

I was shocked to find that there was almost no dialogue between Daisy and Gatsby in the book, and was terrified that I'd have to make it all up. So I did a quick review of Fitzgerald's short stories and, as many of them were similar in that they were about a poor boy and a rich girl, I helped myself to much of the authentic Fitzgerald dialogue from them. I decided that perhaps an interesting idea would be to do one of those scenes that lovers typically have, where they finally get to be together after much longing, and have a "talk all night" scene, which I'd never seen in a film. So I did that – I think a six-page scene in which Daisy and Gatsby stay up all night and talk. And I remember my wife telling me that she and the kids were in New York when The Godfather opened, and it was a big hit and there were lines around the block at five theaters in the city, which was unheard of at the time. I said, "Yeah, yeah, but I've got to finish the Gatsby script." And I sent the script in, just in time. It had taken me two or three weeks to complete.

In his commentary track for the DVD release of The Godfather, Coppola refers to his having written the Gatsby script, adding, "the director didn't particularly, use it. I don't feel that script ever got made."

William Goldman, who loved the novel, said in 2000 that he actively campaigned for the job of adapting the script, but he was astonished by the quality of Coppola's work:

I still believe it to be one of the great adaptations... I called him [Coppola] and told him what a wonderful thing he had done. If you see the movie, you will find all this hard to believe... The director who was hired, Jack Clayton, is a Brit... he had one thing all of them have in their blood: a murderous sense of class... Well, Clayton decided this: that Gatsby's parties were shabby and tacky, given by a man of no elevation and taste. There went the ball game. As shot, they were foul and stupid and the people who attended them were foul and silly, and Robert Redford and Mia Farrow, who would have been so perfect as Gatsby and Daisy, were left hung out to dry. Because Gatsby was a tasteless fool and why should we care about their love? It was not as if Coppola's glory had been jettisoned entirely, though it was tampered with plenty; it was more that the reality and passions it depicted were gone.

=== Filming ===
The Rosecliff and Marble House mansions in Newport, Rhode Island and an exterior of Linden Place mansion in Bristol, Rhode Island, were used for Gatsby's house while scenes at the Buchanans' home were filmed at Pinewood Studios in Buckinghamshire, England. One driving scene was shot in Windsor Great Park, UK. Other scenes were filmed in New York City and Uxbridge, Massachusetts.

Veteran crooner Nick Lucas was chosen by the film's musical director Nelson Riddle to newly record his arrangements of the songs, "I'm Gonna Charleston Back to Charleston", "When You and I Were Seventeen" and "Five Foot Two, Eyes of Blue" for the award-winning soundtrack.

== Reception and legacy ==
The film received mixed reviews, being praised for its faithful interpretation of the novel but also criticized for lacking any true emotion or feelings towards the Jazz Age. Based on 42 total reviews collected by Rotten Tomatoes, the film has an overall approval rating of 40%. The critical consensus reads: "The Great Gatsby proves that even a pair of tremendously talented leads aren't always enough to guarantee a successful adaptation of classic literary source material." Despite this, the film was a financial success, making $26,533,200 against a $7 million budget.

Vincent Canby's 1974 review in The New York Times typifies the critical ambivalence: "The sets and costumes and most of the performances are exceptionally good, but the movie itself is as lifeless as a body that's been too long at the bottom of a swimming pool," Canby wrote at the time. "As Fitzgerald wrote it, The Great Gatsby is a good deal more than an ill-fated love story about the cruelties of the idle rich...The movie can't see this through all its giant closeups of pretty knees and dancing feet. It's frivolous without being much fun."

Stanley Kauffmann of The New Republic wrote: "In sum this picture is a total failure of every requisite sensibility. A long, slow, sickening bore."

Variety's review was likewise split: "Paramount's third pass at The Great Gatsby is by far the most concerted attempt to probe the peculiar ethos of the Beautiful People of the 1920s. The fascinating physical beauty of the $6 million-plus film complements the utter shallowness of most principal characters from the F. Scott Fitzgerald novel. Robert Redford is excellent in the title role, the mysterious gentleman of humble origins and bootlegging connections...The Francis Ford Coppola script and Jack Clayton's direction paint a savagely genteel portrait of an upper class generation that deserved in spades what it received circa 1929 and after."

Roger Ebert gave the movie two and a half stars out of four. Comparing film to the book details, Ebert stated: "The sound track contains narration by Nick that is based pretty closely on his narration in the novel. But we don't feel. We've been distanced by the movie's overproduction. Even the actors seem somewhat cowed by the occasion; an exception is Bruce Dern, who just goes ahead and gives us a convincing Tom Buchanan."

Tennessee Williams, in his book Memoirs, wrote: "It seems to me that quite a few of my stories, as well as my one acts, would provide interesting and profitable material for the contemporary cinema, if committed to... such cinematic masters of direction as Jack Clayton, who made of The Great Gatsby a film that even surpassed, I think, the novel by Scott Fitzgerald."

Fitzgerald's daughter, Frances "Scottie" Fitzgerald, who sold the film rights, had reread her father's novel and noted how Mia Farrow on-set looked the part as her father's Daisy, while Robert Redford also asked advice to match the author's intent, but her father, she noted, was more in the narrator, Nick. However, after viewing the film, Fitzgerald's daughter criticized Farrow's performance as Daisy. Although she praised Farrow as a "fine actress," Scottie noted that Farrow seemed unable to convey the "intensely Southern nature" of Daisy's character.

In the 2004 documentary film Z Channel: A Magnificent Obsession, a montage of scenes of films shown on the defunct Z Channel is played with William Atherton's cover of Irving Berlin's "What'll I Do?" from the 1974 adaptation.

== Awards and honors ==
The film won two Academy Awards, for Best Costume Design (Theoni V. Aldredge) and Best Music (Nelson Riddle). It also won three BAFTA Awards for Best Art Direction (John Box), Best Cinematography (Douglas Slocombe), and Best Costume Design (Theoni V. Aldredge). The male costumes were executed by Ralph Lauren, and the female costumes by Barbara Matera. It won a Golden Globe Award for Best Supporting Actress (Karen Black) and received three further nominations for Best Supporting Actor (Bruce Dern and Sam Waterston) and Most Promising Newcomer (Sam Waterston).

Award	Category	Recipient/Nominee	Result
Academy Awards	Best Costume Design	Theoni V. Aldredge	Won
Academy Awards	Best Scoring: Adaptation	Nelson Riddle	Won
British Academy Film Awards	Best Cinematography	Douglas Slocombe	Won
British Academy Film Awards	Best Costume Design	Theoni V. Aldredge	Won
British Academy Film Awards	Best Production Design	John Box	Won

== Charts ==
The soundtrack was released by Paramount Records (L45481)

Chart (1974)	Position
Australia (Kent Music Report)	22

== See also ==
- Adaptations of The Great Gatsby
- List of American films of 1974
- New Hollywood
