= Adaptations of The Great Gatsby =

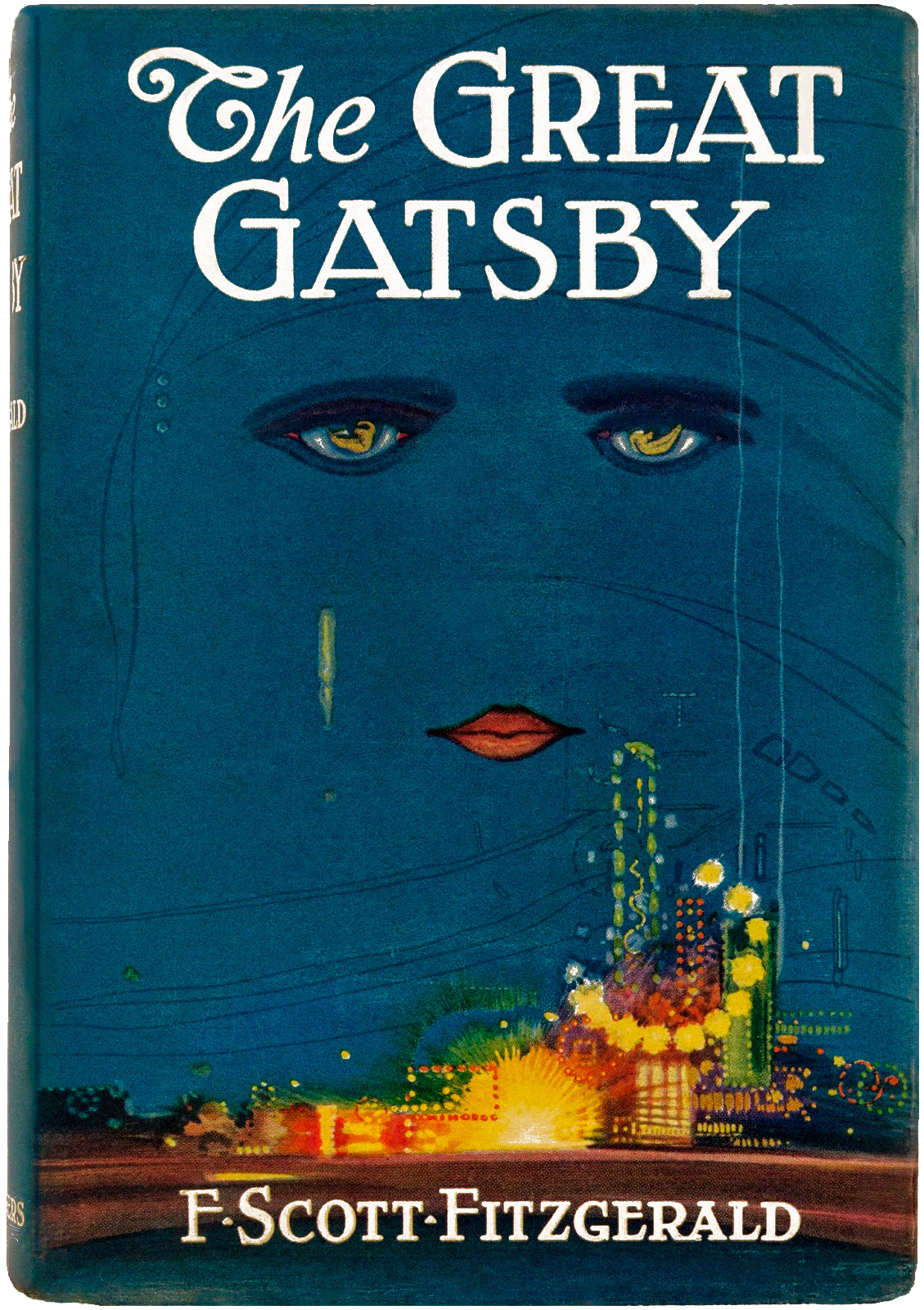
Cover of F. Scott Fitzgerald's 1925 novel The Great Gatsby

The Great Gatsby is a 1925 novel written by American author F. Scott Fitzgerald set during the Jazz Age on Long Island. Since its first publication in 1925, the novel has been widely considered to be a literary masterwork and a contender for the title of the Great American Novel. It has been adapted across various media, including stage, film, television, radio, literature, graphic novels, and video games.

The earliest adaptation occurred with a 1926 Broadway play directed by George Cukor and starring James Rennie and Florence Eldridge. Subsequent stage productions included musicals, such as a 1956 production by the Yale Dramatic Association and several Broadway shows.

Film adaptations began with a now-lost 1926 version, followed by remakes in 1949, 1974, and 2013. Television adaptations have included episodes on NBC's Robert Montgomery Presents in 1955 and CBS's Playhouse 90 in 1958, as well as a low-budget 2000 interpretation.

The novel has also inspired ballets and operas, with a notable performance by the New York Metropolitan Opera. The novel's entry into the public domain in 2021 sparked renewed interest in the material, leading to adaptations in new mediums such as graphic novels and video games.

== Stage ==
=== Plays ===
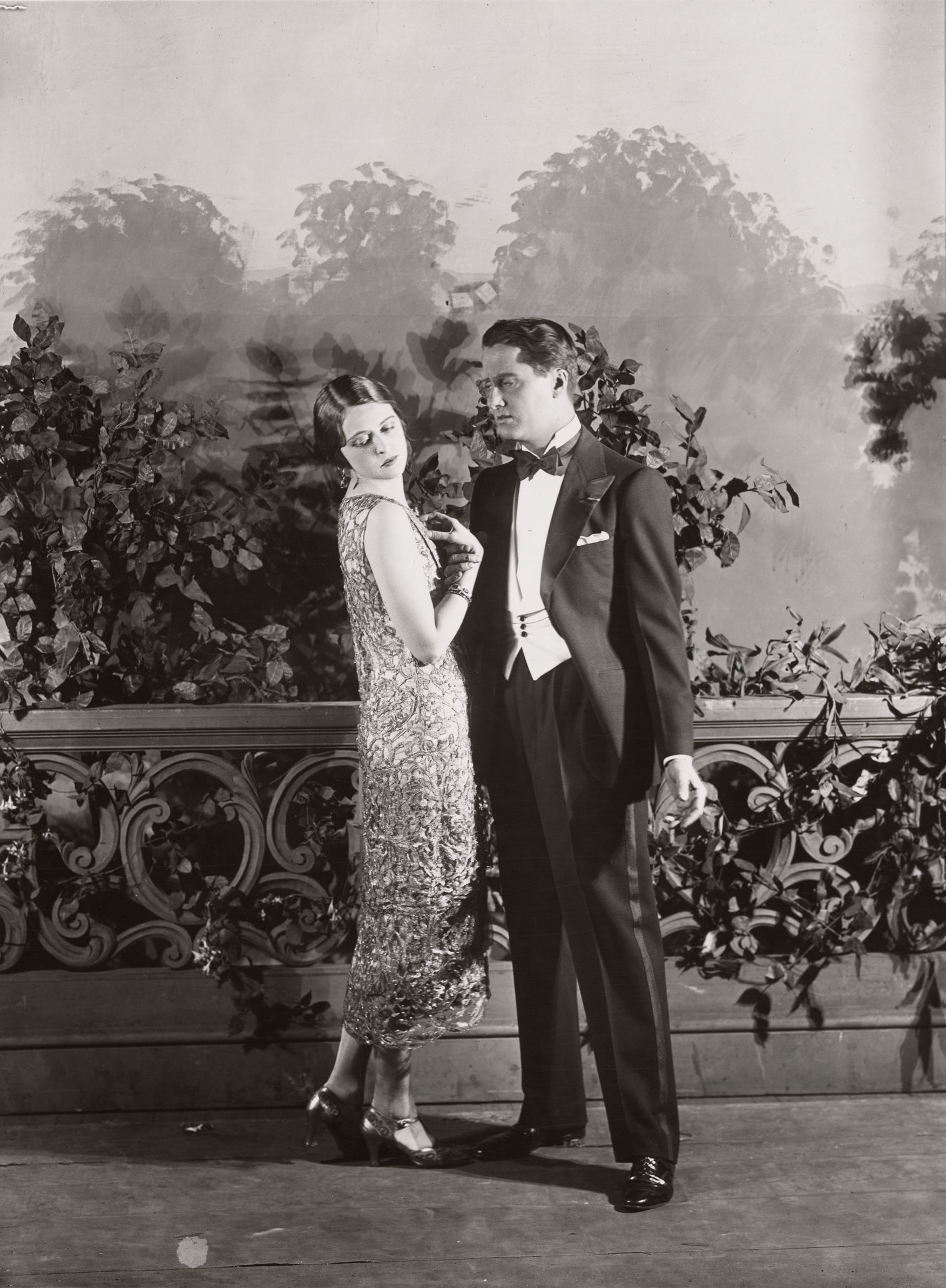
James Rennie as Jay Gatsby and Florence Eldridge as Daisy Buchanan in the first stage adaptation of The Great Gatsby, 1926

In the spring of 1925, William Brady, a veteran theatrical impresario and promoter of prize fights, undertook the first stage adaptation. Brady acquired the rights only a few days after first reading the novel. The script was written by the American dramatist Owen Davis, who had won a Pulitzer Prize in 1923 for his play, Icebound. Davis altered the structure of the novel, rearranging the action in chronological order, eliminating prominent elements such as the valley of ashes and the scene in the Plaza Hotel, and inventing minor characters.

The play opened at the Ambassador Theatre on Broadway on February 2, 1926, directed by future motion picture auteur George Cukor and starring James Rennie as Jay Gatsby, Florence Eldridge as Daisy Buchanan, and Ned Wever as Nick Carraway. The production delighted audiences and garnered rave reviews. Paused when its lead actor James Rennie traveled to the United Kingdom to visit an ailing family member, the run was extended past the originally scheduled closing date, finally ending on May 22, after 112 performances.

With some changes in the cast, the production moved to Chicago, where it opened on August 1. Its popularity again led to an extension of the run, which came to an end in late September. A brief one-week return engagement at New York's Shubert Theater began on October 4, after which a road production traveled to several other cities, including Baltimore, Philadelphia, Detroit, St. Louis, Denver, and Minneapolis. As F. Scott Fitzgerald was vacationing in Europe at the time, he never saw the 1926 Broadway play, but his agent Harold Ober sent him telegrams quoting the glowing reviews of the production. The success of the 1926 Broadway play led to the 1926 film adaptation by director Herbert Brenon.

In the wake of the successful 1926 Broadway play, other productions followed. In July 2006, Simon Levy's stage adaptation, directed by David Esbjornson, premiered at the Guthrie Theater to commemorate the opening of its new theater. 2010 saw the debut of Gatz, an off-Broadway production by Elevator Repair Service. The show is structured around a live reading of the entire novel, which a businessman has found on his desk. Staged with a dinner break and two intermissions, the experience runs for eight hours.

=== Musicals ===
The Yale Dramatic Association performed the first musical production of The Great Gatsby in Summer 1956. For the production, Aubrey L. Goodman adapted Fitzgerald's novel and wrote the lyrics for 14 songs by composer Robert E. Morgan. The show was performed in the University Theatre at Yale University to sold-out performances. The cast included a young Dick Cavett who played a brash young society photographer in the first act and Gatsby's father in the second act. After the Yale production, a number of musical adaptations followed.

A second musical adaptation debuted in Spring 1998, undertaken by Stage One, with Colin Stevens as Gatsby and Ann Marcuson as Jordan Baker. Directed by Phil Smith with an original score by Thomas Johnson, this jazz adaptation premiered at the Pavilion Theatre in Rhyl, Wales. As a jazz adaptation, Johnson's original score emphasized saxophone and brass sextet instruments. The production received considerable press coverage.

A 2023 musical adaptation, with music and lyrics by Jason Howland and Nathan Tysen and a book by Kait Kerrigan announced a one-month limited engagement at the Paper Mill Playhouse. The Broadway tryout began previews on October 12, 2023, followed by an official opening night ten days later. The production concluded on November 12 of the same year. Jeremy Jordan and Eva Noblezada starred as the leading roles of Jay Gatsby and Daisy Buchanan, with Samantha Pauly and Noah J. Ricketts as Jordan Baker and Nick Carraway. The production transferred to Broadway for previews on March 29, 2024, and officially opened April 25.

Gatsby: An American Myth with music and lyrics by Florence Welch and Thomas Bartlett and a book by Martyna Majok premiered at the American Repertory Theater in spring 2024. The production starred Isaac Cole Powell as Jay Gatsby and Ben Levi Ross as Nick Carraway. Previews began May 25, 2024, officially opening June 5, and closed August 3.

=== Other performances ===
The novel has also been adapted for ballet performances. There was a ballet adaptation in 1991. In 2009, BalletMet premiered a version at the Capitol Theatre in Columbus, Ohio. In 2010, The Washington Ballet premiered a version at the Kennedy Center. The show received an encore run the following year.

The New York Metropolitan Opera commissioned John Harbison to compose an operatic treatment of the novel to commemorate the 25th anniversary of James Levine's debut. The work, called The Great Gatsby, premiered on December 20, 1999.

Beginning in 2015, The Great Gatsby: The Immersive Show was London's longest-running immersive show, at seven years. A New York performance of the show occurred in several rooms of the Park Central Hotel in Manhattan. It was also performed in Ireland, Wales, Belgium, and South Korea. In 2022, The Great Gatsby: A Live Radio Play premiered. The show is not broadcast over the radio, but rather, features actors on-stage pretending to be radio performers in 1942.

== Film ==
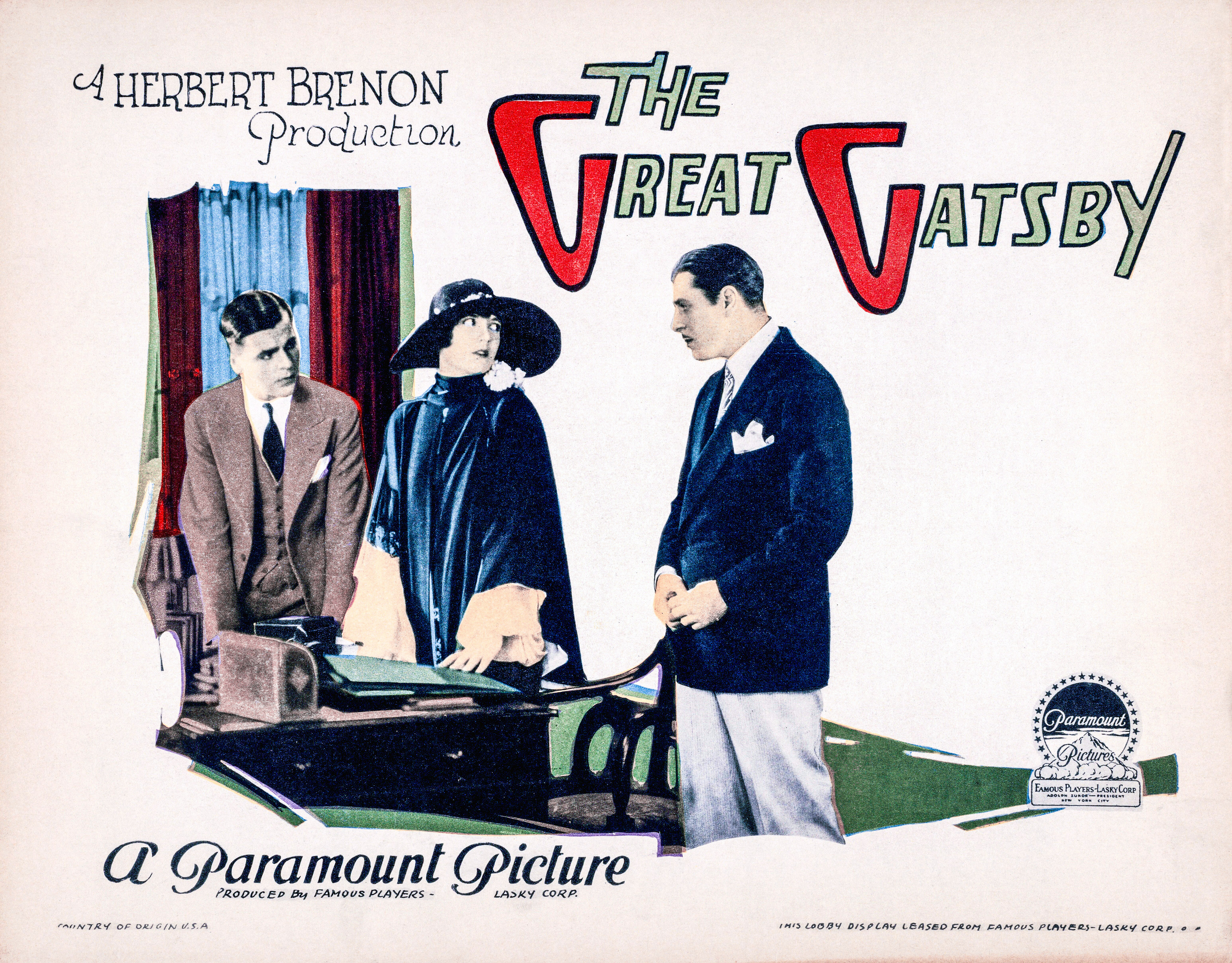
A lobby card for the lost 1926 film adaptation

The 1926 film trailer—the only extant footage

Paramount Pictures produced the first silent film adaptation in 1926. Itself a version of Owen Davis's successful Broadway play, the film was directed by Herbert Brenon and featured Warner Baxter as Gatsby, Lois Wilson as Daisy, Neil Hamilton as Nick Carraway, and William Powell as Wilson. In contrast to later adaptations, two women adapted Fitzgerald's novel for the screen: Elizabeth Meehan wrote the film treatment, and Becky Gardiner wrote the screenplay.

Contemporary reviews suggest it may have been the most faithful adaptation of the novel, and the film received generally positive reviews from critics. Despite these positive reviews, the reception by writer F. Scott Fitzgerald and his wife Zelda proved more ambivalent. According to actress Lois Wilson, who played Daisy in the film, she met Fitzgerald in Hollywood, and the author indicated he liked the film. "As far as I know, he approved of the film when it was released," Wilson recalled. Supporting this claim, Fitzgerald pasted positive reviews of the film in his scrapbook.

Fitzgerald's wife Zelda Sayre, however, held the film in low regard. While living in Los Angeles in early 1927, the couple viewed the film at a nearby theater and walked out midway through the screening. "We saw The Great Gatsby at the movies," Zelda later wrote to their daughter Scottie and her nanny. "It's ROTTEN and awful and terrible and we left." The film is now considered lost, and a trailer of the film at the National Archives is all that is known to exist.

With the advent of sound films, actor Clark Gable conversed with Fitzgerald in Hollywood about remaking The Great Gatsby as a star vehicle for himself in the early 1930s. Gable and writer John O'Hara pressed Paramount Pictures to allow them to do a sound remake with O'Hara writing the screenplay, but their efforts failed, and Fitzgerald died in 1940. Soon after, the publication of the Armed Services Edition of the novel during World War II and the concurrent promotional efforts by the author's friend Edmund Wilson led to a Fitzgerald revival.

Amid this Fitzgerald revival, Paramount Pictures produced a second 1949 film adaptation, The Great Gatsby, directed by Elliott Nugent and starring Alan Ladd as Gatsby, Betty Field as Daisy, and Macdonald Carey as Nick. Twenty-five years later in 1974, The Great Gatsby appeared onscreen again. It was directed by Jack Clayton and starred Robert Redford as Gatsby, Mia Farrow as Daisy, and Sam Waterston as Nick. Most recently, The Great Gatsby was directed by Baz Luhrmann in 2013 and starred Leonardo DiCaprio as Gatsby, Carey Mulligan as Daisy, and Tobey Maguire as Nick.

== Television ==
Gatsby has been recast multiple times as a short-form television movie. The first was in 1955 as an NBC episode for Robert Montgomery Presents starring Robert Montgomery, Phyllis Kirk, and Lee Bowman. The episode was directed by Alvin Sapinsley. In 1958, CBS filmed another adaptation as an episode of Playhouse 90, also titled The Great Gatsby, which was directed by Franklin J. Schaffner and starred Robert Ryan, Jeanne Crain and Rod Taylor. Most recently, the novel was adapted as an A&E movie in 2000. The Great Gatsby was directed by Robert Markowitz and starred Toby Stephens as Gatsby, Mira Sorvino as Daisy, and Paul Rudd as Nick.

== Literature ==
Upon The Great Gatsby's entry to the public domain in 2021, retellings and expansions became legal to publish. Michael Farris Smith's 2021 novel Nick imagines the backstory of Nick Carraway. Although first written in 2014, Smith's publishers waited until Gatsby's copyright lapsed in 2021 to release it. That same year saw the publication of The Chosen and the Beautiful by Nghi Vo, a retelling with elements of the fantasy genre while tackling issues of race and sexuality, and The Pursued and the Pursuing by AJ Odasso, a queer partial retelling and sequel in which Jay Gatsby survives. Anna-Marie McLemore's queer retelling, Self-Made Boys: A Great Gatsby Remix, was released in 2022 and was longlisted for the National Book Award for Young People's Literature.

== Graphic novels ==
The first graphic novel adaptation was in 2007 by Nicki Greenberg, who published The Great Gatsby: A Graphic Adaptation in Australia. Because the original novel was still protected by copyright laws in the United States, this version was never published in the U.S. The second version, The Great Gatsby: The Graphic Novel, was adapted by Fred Fordham and illustrated by Aya Morton in 2020.

In 2021, K. Woodman-Maynard adapted and illustrated The Great Gatsby: A Graphic Novel Adaptation, which was published by Candlewick Press. This was the first graphic novel adaptation of the original novel to be published after it entered the public domain in 2021. In June 2021, Clover Press debuted the first of seven periodical comic books, faithfully adapting The Great Gatsby. In 2024, IDW Publishing released Godzilla's Monsterpiece Theater, a three-part miniseries by Tom Scioli where Gatsby teamed up with Sherlock Holmes, Jules Verne and the Time Traveller from H.G. Wells' The Time Machine to battle the King of the Monsters, with Gatsby funding a version of the anti-kaiju defense team G-Force, only to find himself running afoul of Count Dracula, who schemes to take Daisy as his newest bride and bring Godzilla under his control.

== Radio ==
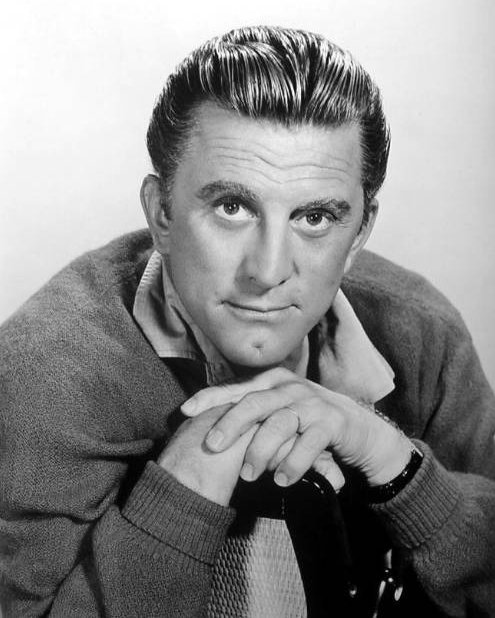
Kirk Douglas voiced Gatsby in a 1950 radio adaptation.

The Great Gatsby was adapted as a radio play in 1939. In 1950, a half-hour-long adaptation for CBS' Family Hour of Stars starred Kirk Douglas as Gatsby. The novel was read aloud by Trevor White for the BBC World Service in ten parts in 2008. In a 2012 BBC Radio 4 broadcast, The Great Gatsby took the form of a Classic Serial dramatization. It was created by dramatist Robert Forrest.

In 2025, a radio adaptation entitled Gatsby in Harlem was broadcast on BBC Radio 3. Written by Roy Williams, the production starred Ncuti Gatwa as Jay Gatsby, Gugu Mbatha-Raw as Daisy Buchanan, and Malachi Kirby as Nick Carraway. The series was one of the biggest winners at the inaugural British Audio Awards 2025, winning Audio of the Year and Best Audio Drama Adaptation, in addition to its star Gatwa winning Best Performance. It was also shortlisted for Best Adaptation at the BBC Audio Drama Awards in 2026.

== Video games ==
In 2010, Oberon Media released a casual hidden object game called Classic Adventures: The Great Gatsby. In 2011, developer Charlie Hoey and editor Pete Smith created an 8-bit-style online game of The Great Gatsby called The Great Gatsby for NES. In 2022, after the Adobe Flash end of life, they adapted this game to an actual NES ROM file, which can also be played on their website. In 2013, Slate released a short symbolic adaptation called The Great Gatsby: The Video Game.

== List of all adaptations ==
| Year | Title | Medium | Adaptors | Distributor | Rotten Tomatoes | Metacritic |
|---|---|---|---|---|---|---|
| 1926 | The Great Gatsby | Stage | George Cukor (director); Owen Davis (script) | Broadway (Ambassador Theatre) | —N/a | —N/a |
| 1926 | The Great Gatsby | Film | Herbert Brenon (director); Becky Gardiner (scenario); Elizabeth Meehan (adaptation) | Paramount Pictures | 55% (22 reviews) | —N/a |
| 1949 | The Great Gatsby | Film | Elliot Nugent (director); Richard Maibaum (screenplay); Cyril Hume (screenplay) | Paramount Pictures | 33% (9 reviews) | —N/a |
| 1950 | The Great Gatsby | Radio | Jean Holloway (adaptation) | Family Hour of Stars | —N/a | —N/a |
| 1955 | The Great Gatsby | Television | Alvin Sapinsley (adaptation) | Robert Montgomery Presents | —N/a | —N/a |
| 1956 | The Great Gatsby | Musical | Leo S. Lavandero (director); Aubrey L. Goodman (book); Aubrey L. Goodman (lyrics); Robert E. Morgan (music) | Yale Dramatic Association | —N/a | —N/a |
| 1958 | The Great Gatsby | Television | Franklin Schaffner (director); David Shaw (adaptation) | Playhouse 90 | —N/a | —N/a |
| 1974 | The Great Gatsby | Film | Jack Clayton (director); Francis Ford Coppola (screenplay) | Paramount Pictures | 39% (36 reviews) | 43 (5 reviews) |
| 1999 | The Great Gatsby | Opera | Mark Lamos (director); John Harbison (music and book) | New York Metropolitan Opera | —N/a | —N/a |
| 2000 | The Great Gatsby | Television | Robert Markowitz (director); John J. McLaughlin (screenplay) | A&E Television Networks | —N/a | —N/a |
| 2006 | The Great Gatsby | Stage | David Esbjornson (director); Simon Levy (adaptation) | Guthrie Theater | —N/a | —N/a |
| 2012 | The Great Gatsby | Radio | Gaynor Macfarlane (director); Robert Forrest (script) | BBC Radio 4 | —N/a | —N/a |
| 2013 | The Great Gatsby | Film | Baz Luhrman (director); Baz Luhrman (screenplay); Craig Pearce (screenplay) | Warner Bros. Pictures | 48% (301 reviews) | 55 (45 reviews) |
| 2021 | Nick | Novel | Michael Farris Smith (author) | Little, Brown and Company | —N/a | —N/a |
| 2021 | The Chosen and the Beautiful | Novel | Nghi Vo (author) | Tordotcom | —N/a | —N/a |
| 2021 | The Pursued and the Pursuing | Novel | AJ Odasso (author) | DartFrog Books | —N/a | —N/a |
| 2022 | Self-Made Boys: A Great Gatsby Remix | Novel | Anna-Marie McLemore (author) | Feiwel & Friends | —N/a | —N/a |
| 2023 | The Great Gatsby | Musical | Marc Bruni (director); Jason Howland (music); Nathan Tysen (lyrics); Kait Kerrigan (book) | Broadway (Paper Mill Playhouse/Broadway Theatre) | —N/a | —N/a |
| 2024 | Gatsby: An American Myth | Musical | Rachel Chavkin (director); Florence Welch (music); Thomas Bartlett (music); Florence Welch (lyrics); Martyna Majok (book) | American Repertory Theater | —N/a | —N/a |
| 2025 | Gatsby in Harlem | Radio | Roy Williams | BBC Radio 3 | —N/a | —N/a |

== See also ==
- Adaptations and portrayals of F. Scott Fitzgerald
