= Barbara Matera (costume designer) =

British-born American costume designer (1929–2001)

Barbara Matera (16 July 1929, Hythe, Kent – 13 September 2001, New York City) was an American costume and clothing designer of English birth.

Matera apprenticed in costume design at the Royal Opera House in London during the late 1940s; she later designed costumes for several productions at that theatre. Her company, Barbara Matera, Ltd., created costumes for several theatrical works, and television and film productions. She designed costumes, often as an assistant designer, for more than 100 Broadway shows, including A Chorus Line, Aida, Dreamgirls, Follies, The Lion King, Wicked and Mamma Mia!. Among the costume made for films were The Great Gatsby (1974), The Addams Family (1991), The Age of Innocence (1993), and 101 Dalmatians (1996) and 102 Dalmatians (2000). She also designed costumes for productions at the Metropolitan Opera, New York City Ballet, and the American Ballet Theatre among other ballet and opera companies. As a clothing designer, she created clothes for an impressive list of famous clientele, including Mick Jagger and Hillary Clinton. Her company, Barbara Matera Ltd., made Clinton's ballgown for the 1993 United States presidential inauguration; a dress designed by Sarah Phillips. In 1996, her work was the subject of an exhibition at the New York Library for the Performing Arts.
