= The Great Gatsby (1949 film) =

1949 film directed by Elliott Nugent

- Original film poster
- Directed by: Elliott Nugent
- Screenplay by: Richard Maibaum; Cyril Hume
- Based on: The Great Gatsby 1925 novel by F. Scott Fitzgerald; The Great Gatsby 1926 play by Owen Davis
- Produced by: Richard Maibaum
- Starring: Alan Ladd; Betty Field; Macdonald Carey; Ruth Hussey; Barry Sullivan; Howard Da Silva; Shelley Winters
- Cinematography: John F. Seitz
- Edited by: Ellsworth Hoagland
- Music by: Robert Emmett Dolan
- Production company: Paramount Pictures
- Distributed by: Paramount Pictures
- Release date: July 13, 1949
- Running time: 91 minutes
- Country: United States
- Language: English
- Box office: $2 million

The Great Gatsby is a 1949 American historical romance drama film directed by Elliott Nugent and produced by Richard Maibaum, from a screenplay by Richard Maibaum and Cyril Hume. The film stars Alan Ladd, Betty Field, Macdonald Carey, Ruth Hussey, and Barry Sullivan and features Shelley Winters and Howard Da Silva, the latter of whom returned in the 1974 version. It is based on the 1925 novel The Great Gatsby by F. Scott Fitzgerald. Set during the raucous Jazz Age on Long Island near New York City, the plot follows the exploits of enigmatic millionaire and bootlegger Jay Gatsby, who attempts to win back the affections of his former lover Daisy Buchanan with the aid of her second cousin Nick Carraway.

In the 1940s, Paramount Pictures still held the rights to Fitzgerald's novel, having previously made the now-lost 1926 version. Producer Richard Maibaum became intent on making a new film adaptation, and he envisioned Alan Ladd, with whom he previously collaborated on O.S.S. (1946), in the role of Gatsby. Although Maibaum and Ladd were eager to make the film, Paramount executives hesitated as the novel had not yet attained widespread popularity. Despite studio objections, Maibaum and Ladd persisted, and by 1946, Paramount announced plans for the film. However, production obstacles arose when Production Code Administration head Joseph Breen rejected the screenplay due to its perceived immorality.

The screenplay underwent multiple rewrites to appease the censors, including adding moralizing elements that deviated from Fitzgerald's 1925 novel. Maibaum reluctantly made these changes in his determination to see the film produced. Disagreements next arose between the original director John Farrow and Maibaum over the role of Daisy, with Farrow favoring Gene Tierney and Maibaum preferring Betty Field. This conflict led to Farrow's departure and his replacement by Elliott Nugent. (Farrow's daughter, Mia Farrow, later starred as Daisy in the 1974 adaptation.) The film's release garnered mixed reviews, with some praising the performances while others criticized the film for its deviations from the novel.

== Plot ==
In 1948, a middle-aged Nick Carraway is happily married to ex-flapper Jordan Baker, and the couple visits the grave of their deceased acquaintance Jay Gatsby. Carraway sermonizes that he did not approve of Gatsby's sinful life, and he quotes the Book of Proverbs to condemn Gatsby's actions as wicked: "There is a way which seemeth right unto a man, but the end thereof are the ways of death."

A flashback occurs to 1928 during the period of Prohibition in the United States. After killing two rival gangsters in a street shootout, bootlegger Jay Gatsby purchases a Long Island Sound estate in order to host wild parties. He persuades Daisy's friend Jordan Baker to arrange a private meeting with Daisy in exchange for his Duesenberg roadster. Gatsby and Daisy had been in love during World War I. Daisy begged Gatsby to marry her, but Gatsby insisted they wait until he made a fortune.

Now a powerful gangster reigning over "a dark empire," Gatsby yearns to reunite with Daisy, but she is married to the far wealthier Tom Buchanan. Despite her marriage, Daisy is discontented. She is aware of her husband's dalliance with Myrtle Wilson, the wife of gas station owner George Wilson. Daisy appears to be receptive to Gatsby's romantic overtures. Together with Jordan Baker and Nick, they spend time in the city. Later, while driving Gatsby's car, Daisy accidentally strikes Myrtle in the street.

Returning home, Daisy confesses to Tom, Nick, and Jordan that she killed Myrtle. Tom, Daisy, and Jordan plot to blame Gatsby for Myrtle's death, but Nick objects and leaves. Gatsby overhears this discussion while standing unseen on the veranda. Wilson suspects that Tom killed Myrtle, and he confronts Tom at his home. Tom refuses to reveal Gatsby's name, and Wilson leaves. Tom tries to call Gatsby to warn him that his life is in danger, but Gatsby does not answer the telephone. While talking to Nick at his mansion's pool, Gatsby renounces his sinful life moments before Wilson shoots him. Only Nick and Jordan attend Gatsby's funeral. The couple decides to marry and depart for the Midwest.

== Cast ==
- Alan Ladd as Jay Gatsby
- Betty Field as Daisy Buchanan
- Macdonald Carey as Nick Carraway
- Ruth Hussey as Jordan Baker
- Barry Sullivan as Tom Buchanan
- Shelley Winters as Myrtle Wilson
- Howard Da Silva as George Wilson
- Elisha Cook, Jr. as Klipspringer
- Ed Begley as Myron Lupus
- Henry Hull as Dan Cody
- Walter Greaza as Kinsella
- Tito Vuolo as Mavromichaelis
- Jack Lambert as Reba
- Ray Teal as Cop (uncredited)

== Production ==
=== Development ===
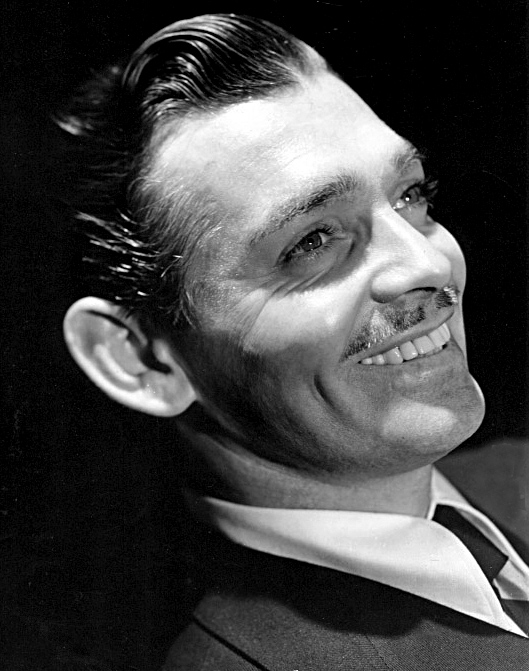
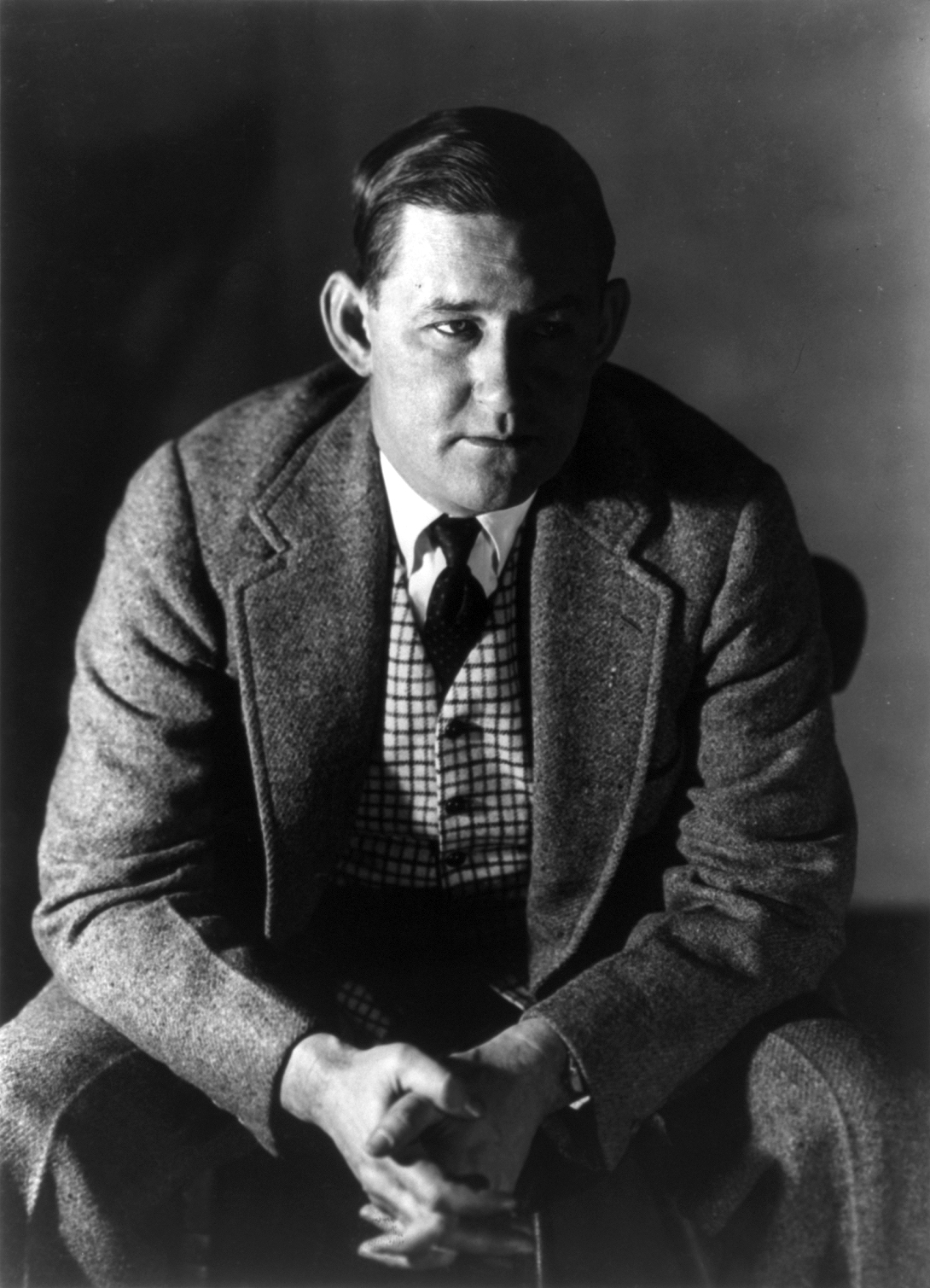
Actor Clark Gable (left) and writer John O'Hara (right) attempted to make a second film adaptation of Fitzgerald's novel but failed in their efforts.

In 1926, Paramount Pictures paid $45,000 (equivalent to $818,374 in 2025) to purchase the film rights to F. Scott Fitzgerald's critically acclaimed yet commercially unsuccessful 1925 novel. The studio produced the first film adaptation in November 1926 starring Warner Baxter as Jay Gatsby, Lois Wilson as Daisy Buchanan, Neil Hamilton as Nick Carraway, and William Powell as George Wilson. For the next two decades, the studio held the film rights to Fitzgerald's novel.

With the advent of sound films, actor Clark Gable often conversed with F. Scott Fitzgerald in Hollywood about remaking The Great Gatsby as a star vehicle for himself in the early 1930s. Gable and writer John O'Hara pressed Paramount Pictures to allow them to do a sound remake with O'Hara writing the screenplay, but their efforts failed, and Fitzgerald died in 1940. Soon after, the publication of the Armed Services Edition of the novel during World War II and the concurrent promotional efforts by the author's friend Edmund Wilson led to a Fitzgerald revival.

As the Fitzgerald revival slowly gained salience in popular culture, Paramount producer and screenwriter Richard Maibaum—who had met F. Scott Fitzgerald during the author's sojourn in Hollywood—became intent on a new adaptation starring Oklahoma-raised actor Alan Ladd. Maibaum became friends with Ladd during their collaboration on the 1946 film O.S.S. Maibaum presented the idea to Ladd and his wife, Sue Carol. Despite initial reservations, Maibaum recalled, "they liked it; they were a bit hesitant, but I persuaded them." The role of Jay Gatsby intrigued Ladd since the character offered a departure from Ladd's typical action roles and allowed him a chance to demonstrate a broader acting range. During these discussions, Maibaum observed that Ladd seemed perfect for the nouveau riche role of Gatsby:

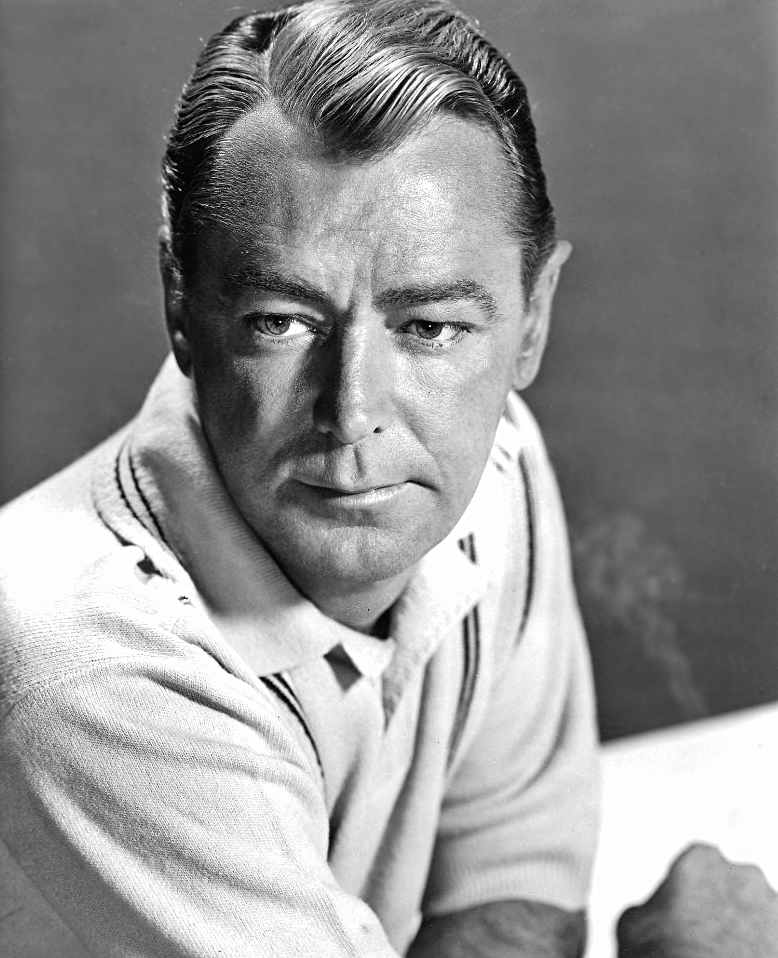
Producer Richard Maibaum believed that actor Alan Ladd's origins as an "Okie", a poor Oklahoma migrant, made him ideal for the nouveau riche role of millionaire Jay Gatsby.

I was in [Ladd's] house and he took me up to the second floor, where he had a wardrobe about as long as this room. He opened it up and there must have been hundreds of suits, sport jackets, slacks and suits. He looked at me and said, "Not bad for an Okie kid, eh?" I got goose pimples because I remembered when Gatsby took Daisy to show her his mansion, he also showed her his wardrobe and said, "I've got a man in England who buys me clothes. He sends over a selection of things at the beginning of each season, spring and fall." I said to myself, "My God, he is the Great Gatsby!"

Although Maibaum and Ladd wanted to make the film, Paramount executives proved hesitant to make this second film adaptation as Fitzgerald's beloved novel had not yet attained widespread popularity. "This was in late 1946," Maibaum recalled. "Scott Fitzgerald had been dead since 1940. So it seemed, except in the hearts of a few devotees, were his out-of-print novels. His reputation was at its lowest ebb. The Jazz Age he celebrated was regarded as an aberration. But I saw a similarity between what was happening in 1946 to what had happened to the country in 1920 and, with Alan and Sue's help, kept badgering the studio until it agreed to let us prepare a script."

Maibaum and Ladd persisted until Paramount executives relented and commissioned a screenplay. Paramount publicly announced its plans to make the film starring Ladd in March 1946, with the script to be written by Maibaum and Cyril Hume. However, the mere idea of remaking The Great Gatsby set amid the hedonistic excess of the Jazz Age soon ran afoul of the censors, in particular Production Code Administration head Joseph Breen.

=== Censorship issues ===
We were informed [by the censors that] the script was totally unacceptable... Specifically, it violated the [Motion Picture Production] Code then in effect because it dealt with adultery, unpunished manslaughter, glamorized a gangster, depicted excessive use of liquor, undermined the institutions of marriage and the home, lowered moral standards, presented impure love as attractive and beautiful, etc, etc.

— Richard Maibaum, July 1973

Upon reading the first draft of the screenplay by Richard Maibaum and Cyril Hume, censor Joseph Breen rejected the script for having "a low moral tone." He criticized their screenplay for its violations of the Motion Picture Production Code. He specifically denounced their work for depicting adultery, excessive drinking, unpunished manslaughter, bootlegging, and other perceived moral transgressions.

Breen demanded that the screenplay be rewritten to avoid accurately evoking the libertine atmosphere of the Jazz Age. Breen further insisted that the screenplay include a voice of morality and a lengthy preamble that outright condemned Gatsby's behavior as immoral and leading to damnation. Desperate to make the film, Maibaum capitulated to Breen's demands, although he later regretted doing so.

Maibaum and Hume appeased the censors by altering plot details and by adding a scene at the beginning of the script where Nick Carraway, now married to Jordan Baker, quotes from Proverbs 14:12: "[There] is a way which seemeth right unto a man, but the end thereof are the ways of death." Having been forced to make these changes against his will, Maibaum felt such additions were "all wrong and very un-Fitzgerald-like. To moralize like that was something he never did; he was always indirect. It was the price I paid to get the film done."

Despite these rewrites, the censors still refused to greenlight the film. After Breen's retirement, his successor Eric Johnston likewise proved reluctant to approve the film. "The Johnston office seems to be afraid of starting a new jazz cycle," Maibaum told the press in 1946. Due to the constant meddling by censors, critics later noted that the film's script contained very little of "the flavor of the Prohibition era." When censor Eric Johnston finally approved the bowdlerized script, Paramount slated the film for production in October 1947. However, Maibaum claimed that Paramount delayed the film's production. "They used the script as a carrot to make Alan do several other [lower quality] films, each time promising that his next would be Gatsby", wrote the producer. "Finally after two long years of this he rebelled and threatened to go on suspension. That did it."

=== Casting dispute ===
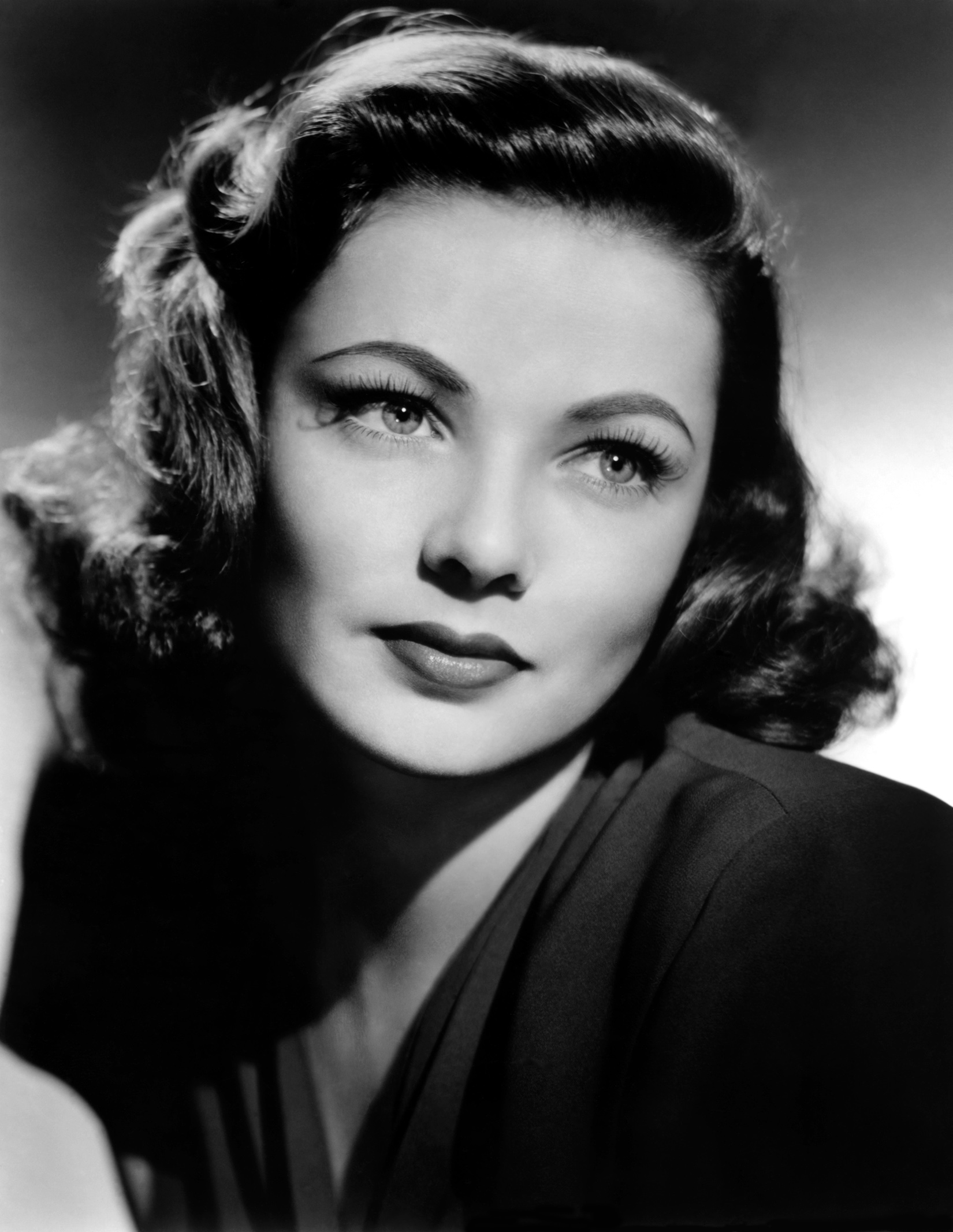
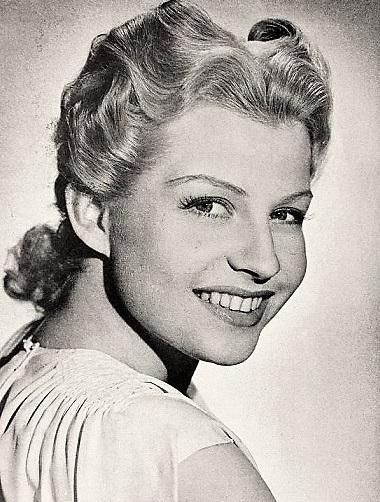
The original director John Farrow and producer Richard Maibaum disagreed over the casting of Daisy Buchanan. Farrow wanted Gene Tierney (left) for the role, while Maibaum favored Betty Field (right). Unable to agree, Farrow quit the production.

Paramount Pictures originally hired Australian émigré John Farrow, the husband of actress Maureen O'Sullivan and father of Mia Farrow, to direct the film. Farrow had made several successful films with Ladd, as well as The Big Clock with Maibaum. Farrow and Maibaum soon disagreed over the casting of Daisy Buchanan. Maibaum recalled their intense disagreement in detail:

We were agreed that the character... was a beautiful, glamorous, unstable girl. Farrow however placed more importance on the glamour and beauty than I did. Hollywood was full of beautiful girls. I wanted more, an actress who could handle what has been called 'the disharmonic chatter of the '20s', the authentic sound of the feckless, disillusioned lost generation... What we needed was a fine actress who could make believable the obsessive love she evoked from him.

Farrow insisted upon Gene Tierney for the role of Daisy, but Maibaum pushed for Betty Field. Tiring of their impasse, studio production head Henry Ginsberg gave the final say to Maibaum. When Maibaum informed Farrow that Field would be cast as Daisy, Farrow quit the production. "I don't direct pictures under conditions like that," Farrow told Maibaum. "Find yourself another boy." (Farrow's daughter, Mia Farrow, later portrayed Daisy Buchanan in the 1974 film adaptation.) With production now imminent, Maibaum replaced Farrow as director with Elliott Nugent. Although enthusiastic about the casting of Betty Field as Daisy, Nugent held deep reservations about Alan Ladd as Jay Gatsby, although he kept these doubts from Maibaum.

Nugent later wrote in his memoir that he had two main reservations about taking the job—Ladd's casting and the fact that Maibaum was writer and producer, "which seemed less than ideal; I guessed he would not be too amenable to many changes." However, "I kept most of my doubts to myself because of my great desire to work on what I had always considered Scott Fitzgerald’s best novel and perhaps the best of all American novels."

Nugent was pleased with his supporting cast but confirmed, "As the time for shooting approached, I became seriously neurotic and was filled with terror about what I had done or left undone. I was afraid either to withdraw or to go ahead. I did not confess my feelings to my professional associates nor even to my wife, though I was in a blue funk. It seemed to me that I was betraying Fitzgerald as well as my friends at Paramount."

The day before filming, Nugent claims he wrote a suicide note, drove to the Roosevelt Hotel, went to the tenth floor, and considered jumping off. However, he changed his mind.

=== Filming ===
Throughout filming, director Elliott Nugent suffered from mental health difficulties. Throughout the shoot, Nugent proved to be indecisive, which Maibaum attributed to his mental health challenges. In his memoir, Nugent admitted, "I felt worried, uncertain, and I often had trouble making decisions." In a June 1978 interview, Nugent spoke of his dissatisfaction with directing the film: "I felt very unhappy when I was making Gatsby. I thought I shouldn't be doing it and Alan Ladd shouldn't be playing in it. Ladd wasn't quite up to it, but he got away with it."

Nugent primarily filmed the entire production indoors on Paramount's studio lot, including the exterior shots, to circumvent potential delays often associated with location shooting, such as changing sunlight, sudden downpours, or intrusive tourists. Alan Ladd, at the pinnacle of his fame after returning from service in World War II, couldn't go on location as crowds would mob him during public appearances. As a result, Nugent limited filming to the controlled yet artificial environment of a brightly lit Hollywood sound stage, compromising the production's realism.

Although filming went smoothly, Ladd's behavior created challenges on set. His height, purportedly 5 ft 4 in (163 cm) to 5 ft 9 in (175 cm), proved difficult to conceal in shots alongside taller actors Macdonald Carey, Barry Sullivan, and Howard da Silva. "Because of this [the height disparity]," makeup artist Hal Lierley stated, "the studio built a raised platform [for Ladd], which was covered with carpet that sloped down to the regular floor of the sound stage." Humiliated by this platform, Ladd declared that he would demand approval of his future male costars to ensure similar heights. Next, Ladd refused to remove his wedding ring or to kiss Field. Arguing that many of his fans were children, he did not wish to play a character who kisses a married woman. Producer Richard Maibaum overcame Ladd's protests, and Ladd's Gatsby kisses Field's Daisy in one scene.

Macdonald Carey confirmed in his memoirs that the production built a trench for Carey, who was over six foot, to walk alongside Ladd, who was put on planks. He added:

I remember, too, all of us were drinkers — Nicholas Joy, Barry Sullivan, Alan, and me. We only drank at the end of the day, though, and we never drank with the director, Elliott Nugent. This is out of respect for his weakness, liquor. He had a reputation as an alcoholic. Supposedly, they had trouble finding him in order to start the picture. He had gotten on a train and stayed on it for a few days until he drank himself sober.

Assistant director Herbert Coleman recalled, "While the film was in production, Alan lived the part of Gatsby. His moods offstage were in perfect harmony with his Gatsby character." Nugent confirmed that Ladd was "nervous" during the shoot "all the more so because he wanted this picture to be great and he had a lot of difficulty remembering his lines." He said the fact Carey "never so much as fluffed a word. This perfection seemed to bother Alan."

While filming the climax where Wilson shoots Gatsby in a swimming pool, Ladd's 5-year-old daughter Alana Ladd became traumatized by watching her father pretend to die. When Howard Da Silva fired a gun at Ladd and a capsule underneath Ladd's skin oozed blood into the swimming pool, a shocked Alana began to cry, assuming that Da Silva had actually killed her father. Da Silva attempted to comfort the child. "Look, he's coming out of the water, it's just pretend," Da Silva recalled. "[But] a child that age doesn't know pretend from not pretend... I remember feeling quite strange about that." Thirty years later, Alana recalled the traumatic incident: "I remember that day vividly, vividly. The blood hit the water, and I started to cry. It had taken them a whole day to set up and two hours to form the capsule on his back, and I ruined the take."

== Reception ==
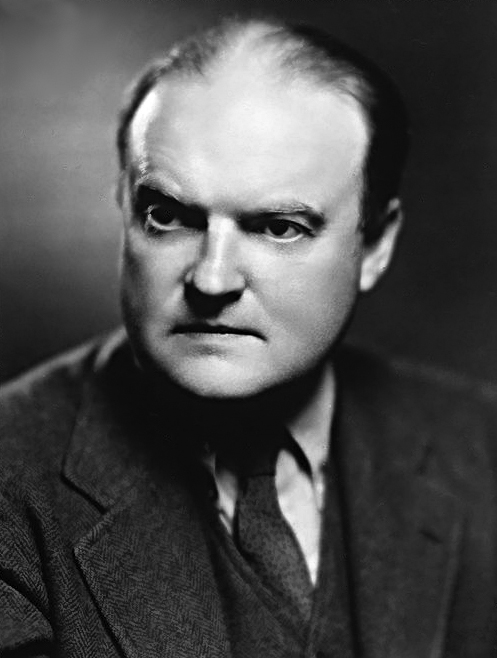
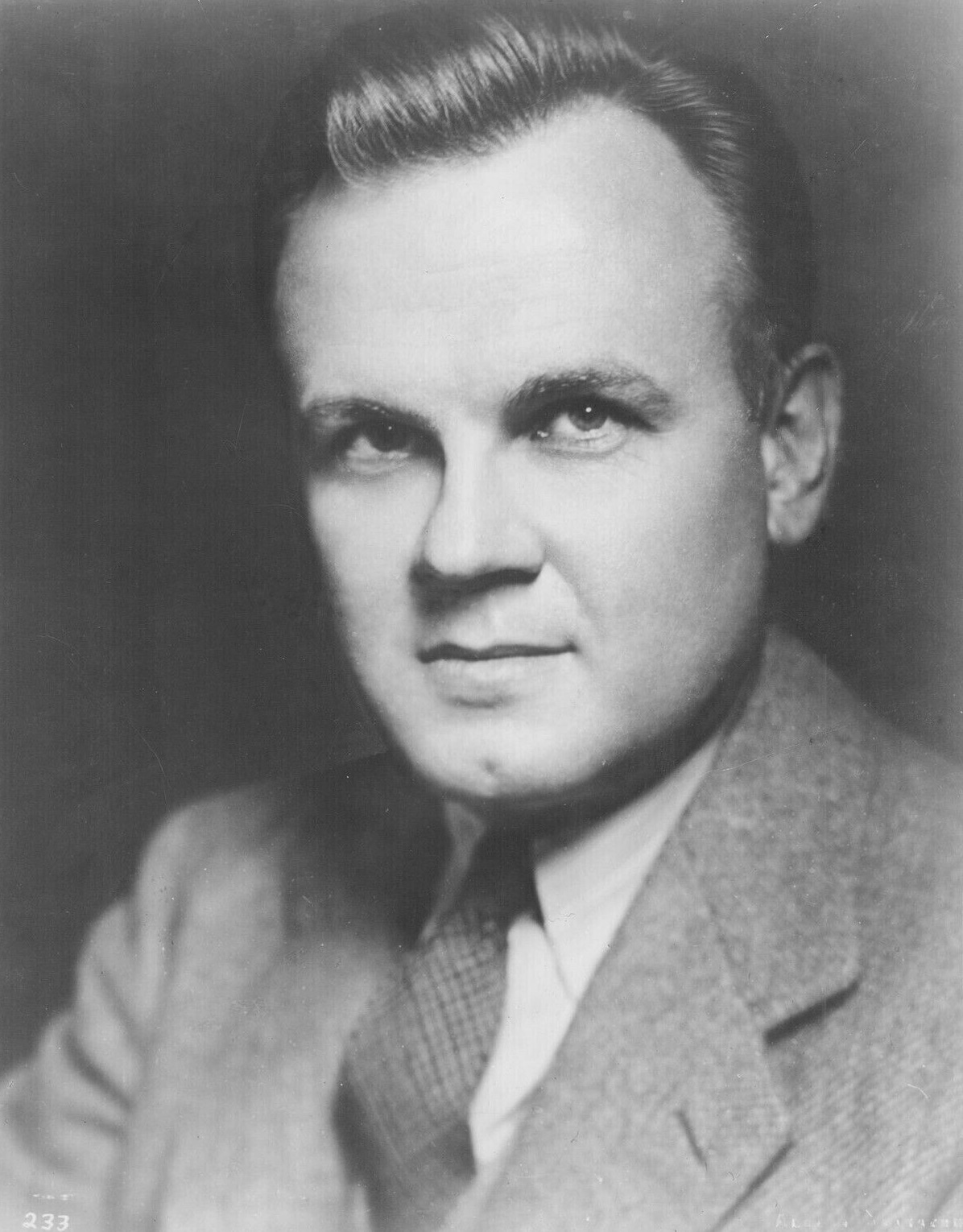
Fitzgerald's close friend and literary critic Edmund Wilson (left) disliked the film. Film critic Bosley Crowther (right) panned the film as a mediocre romance in his review in The New York Times.

=== Fitzgerald's friends ===
Fitzgerald's close friend and literary critic Edmund Wilson, who had known Fitzgerald since their days as classmates at Princeton University, disliked the film. As Wilson had played a pivotal role in creating the F. Scott Fitzgerald revival in the late 1940s, Paramount Pictures arranged a private screening of the film for Wilson in the hopes of earning his public endorsement.

According to witness Stanley Kauffmann, after Wilson viewed the film and exited the screening room, a smiling Paramount publicity man approached him and asked him how he had liked the picture. "Not very much, I'm afraid," replied Wilson, and he kept walking to the elevator. The Paramount publicity man appeared to be betrayed by Wilson's reply and seemed to say, "We've gone to the trouble of making a whole movie out of your friend's book and you don't even appreciate it!"

=== Box office ===
According to Variety, the film ranked 45th among popular movies in the U.S. and Canada in 1949 with estimated rentals of $2 million. Maibaum claimed the film "did well financially." Nugent confirmed this.

=== Contemporary reviews ===
Most of the tragic implications and bitter ironies of Mr. Fitzgerald's work have gone by the boards in allowing for the generous exhibition of Mr. Ladd. Solemnly representing Gatsby, he gives us a long and lingering look at a patient and saturnine fellow who is plagued by a desperate love.... But somehow he does not present us with the picture of a strangely self-made man as the pitiful victim of the times and his own expansive greed.... Blame this mostly on a weak script, coupled with dull direction.

— Bosley Crowther, The New York Times, July 14, 1949

Variety asserted that the film "fails to jell as first class screen entertainment, but it has Alan Ladd and other good cast names to help ticket sales... the script stresses the love story rather than the hijacking, bootlegging elements which the Ladd fans would have liked more. Ladd handles his characterization ably, making it as well-rounded as the yarn permits and fares better than other cast members in trying to make the surface characters come to life."

The New York Times review by Bosley Crowther dismissed the film as "a limp, sentimental romance, involving a bootlegger and an old sweetheart, based on Scott Fitzgerald's classic story, but lacking the novel's bite." Crowther lamented that, despite the Jazz Age setting, "the period of the Nineteen Twenties is briefly and inadequately sketched with a jumble of gay Long Island parties, old clothes, old songs and old cars." He noted the conspicuous absence of "the baneful influence of prohibition and the disillusionment of post-World War I." Crowther deemed Ladd's solemn portrayal of Gatsby as giving the impression of "a patient and saturnine fellow who is plagued by a desperate love".

Critics expressed conflicted opinions about Betty Field's performance as Daisy. Critic Lew Sheaffer wrote in The Brooklyn Daily Eagle that Field performed "the difficult feat of making a strong impact" as Gatsby's "vague, shilly-shallying sweetheart." Boyd Martin of The Courier-Journal opined that Field adeptly conveyed "the shallowness of Daisy's character", whereas Wanda Hale of The New York Daily News complained that Field gave "such a restrained, delicate performance that you have to use some imagination to understand her weakness."

Critic Lew Sheaffer wrote in The Brooklyn Daily Eagle that Macdonald Carey acquitted himself well as Nick Carraway, Gatsby's only friend. Likewise, Boyd Martin of The Courier-Journal opined that Carey gave a quiet and reserved performance.

Maibaum claimed "reviews were mixed. Critics differed as much as John Farrow and myself about Betty Field's Daisy. Some thought she was perfect, others that she was subtly wrong. Alan, for the most part, received surprisingly good personal notices. My own satisfaction stemmed from what Charles Brackett of sainted memory to all screenwriters said to me: 'You've personally started an F. Scott Fitzgerald revival'."

Nugent reflected that while the film "never completely satisfied me, it received good reviews, even for Ladd, and was a financial success. While I had certainly not delivered 100 percent of my potential ability, I had gotten enough help from my able associates to avoid disaster. In fact, hardly anyone except Bob Montgomery knew how panicky I had been, and even he did not know the whole story. I had learned one lesson, to which I held on—never commit suicide today—there will be tomorrows. Live one day at a time."

=== Retrospective reviews ===
According to film scholar Wheeler Winston Dixon, the 1949 version of The Great Gatsby is "a curiously tedious, flat, and unimaginative film, lacking both visual and thematic resonance." Dixon posits that the film's shortcomings primarily stem from Elliott Nugent's uninspired direction, accentuated by an overly wordy and meandering screenplay. As a result, the film appears to lack a cohesive vision, both visually and thematically.

In a May 2025 article for The New York Review of Books, writer Andrew Delbanco described this black-and-white 1949 adaptation of The Great Gatsby as belonging to the film noir genre, and for this reason, its brisk pace stands in contrast to the 1974 film adaptation, 2000 television adaptation, and 2013 film adaptation, all of which "are talky and stodgy, with the predictable feel of a period piece."

== Restoration ==
Following its theatrical release in 1949, Paramount Pictures did not produce any new prints of the film. Over the decades, extant prints either deteriorated or disappeared. In 2012, Alan K. Rode of the Film Noir Foundation, which searches for rare or missing prints in the hopes of preserving films for future generations, contacted Universal Pictures and urged them to create a new print. After locating the film in their archives, Universal struck a new distribution print that debuted at the Noir City Festival in San Francisco and the Grauman's Egyptian Theatre in Hollywood in spring 2012.

== See also ==
- Adaptations of The Great Gatsby
