= Sarah Phillips (fashion designer) =

American fashion designer

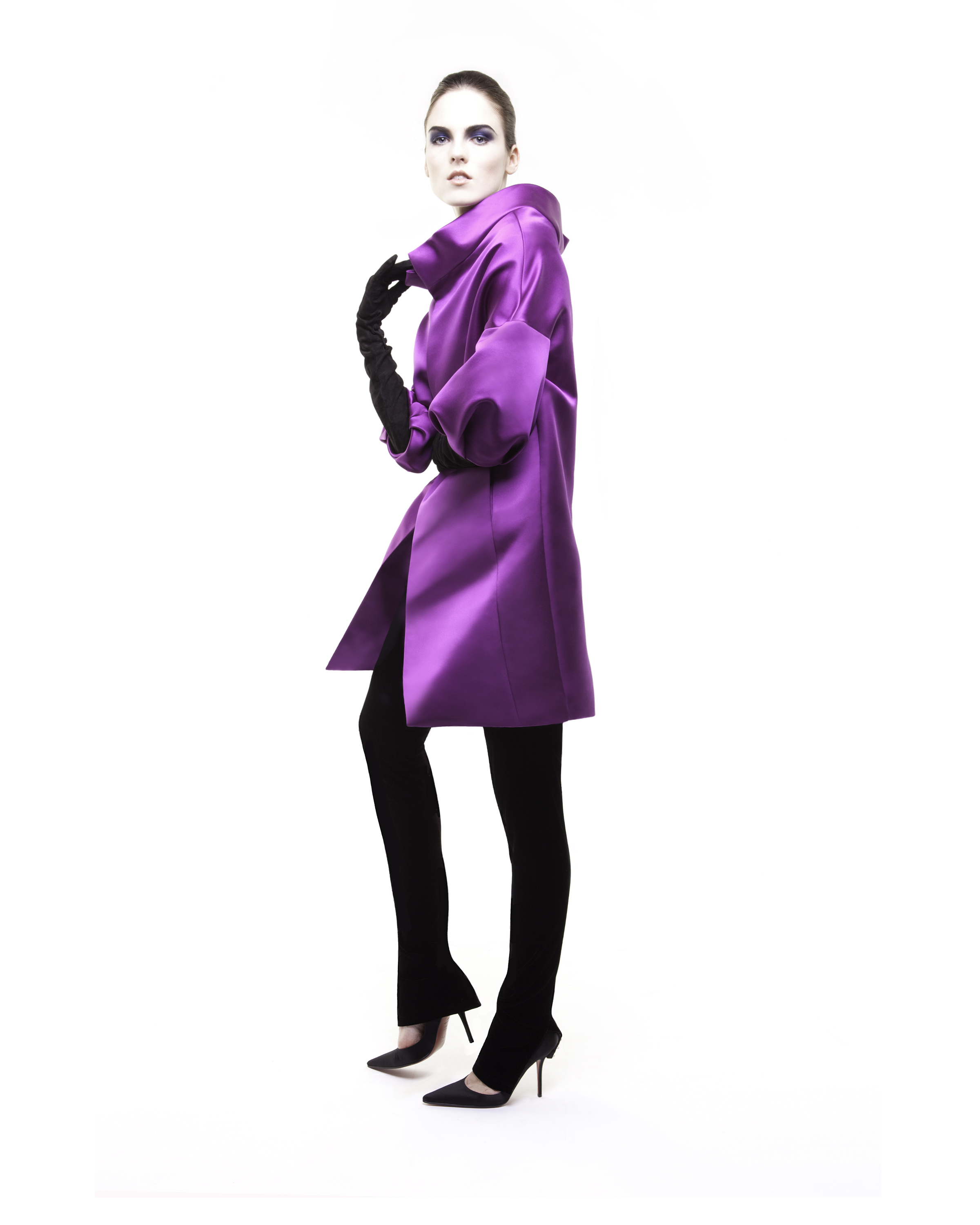
- Born: New York City, U.S.
- Occupation: Fashion designer
- Years active: 1989 to present
- Notable work: The 1993 Inaugural Ball gown for Hillary Rodham Clinton

Sarah Phillips is an American luxury couture fashion designer.

Deemed "7th Avenue's Cinderella", Phillips was selected to design Hillary Rodham Clinton's gown for the 1993 Inaugural Ball. Though Phillips lost her initial financial backing, she continued producing her collections and selling to her major accounts Neiman Marcus, Saks Fifth Avenue, and luxury specialty stores through the United States, Hong Kong, Canada and international locations.

== Early life ==
Phillips was born in New York City, and is an alumna of the Parsons School of Design in NYC.

== Career ==
During the early years of her career, she worked for Yves Saint Laurent, Ralph Lauren, and Christian Dior.

Phillips began professionally designing her own pieces in 1989, while still working for Dior.⁣ She sold several of her first pieces to Henri Bendel, where they were featured in the front store windows along Fifth Avenue. She produced her first official line in April 1991 while working out of her loft in lower Manhattan. The line, a 15-piece collection of suits and evening clothes, was bought by Saks Fifth Avenue and Neiman Marcus amongst other specialty stores throughout the US, Canada, and Hong Kong. represented with Karl Lagerfeld and Richard Tyler as the “structuralists”.

Lisa Anderson of the Chicago Tribune states that "Phillips' clean, classic designs in suits and separates, her high-quality workmanship and her relatively affordable ($400 to $1,500) prices attracted store buyers." Her sales doubled between her first and second years of business.

Phillips, took a hiatus, from designing, in order to spend more time with her family and continued with her illustration. Phillips announced she would be relaunching her line in 2013. Her new collection consisted of "40 special-occasion pieces made of silk and cashmere" and a scaled-back business model; the line was sold only through trunk shows to her private clients and her website.

== 1993 Inaugural Ball gown ==
Hillary Clinton, then the First Lady of Arkansas, wore a pale yellow silk suit designed by Phillips, to the 1992 Democratic National Convention, at Madison Square Garden, where her husband William Jefferson Clinton, then Governor of Arkansas, accepted the Democratic nomination for President of the United States.

Michelle Revere, a couture and designer buyer, from the specialty designer store where Clinton discovered the suit, encouraged Phillips to submit sketches for the gown Clinton would wear to the 1993 Inaugural Ball. Her sketch was selected; Phillips described the resulting design, a couture violet lace sheath gown with a silk mousseline overskirt, as "a fairy-tale sort of dress, very traditional, which really isn't typical of my style."

Nicole Fischelis, then-fashion director of Saks Fifth Avenue, said of the gown, "I think Sarah Phillips is part of a new generation of young designers who are very contemporary and have a definite feel for quality clothes … I think it's terrific that Mrs. Clinton would pick someone young and newly introduced to the public."

The gown appeared on several national television shows and in magazines, such as Today, People Magazine, and in parody form with Madonna playing Hillary Clinton, on Saturday Night Live. It was later introduced into The Museum of American History at the Smithsonian Institution's collection of First Lady Inaugural Ball gowns. Following the ball, Phillips was asked to design gowns for several other women for that year's Academy Awards red carpet and ceremony. She also became a member of the CFDA.
