= The Great Gatsby (1926 film) =

1926 film directed by Herbert Brenon

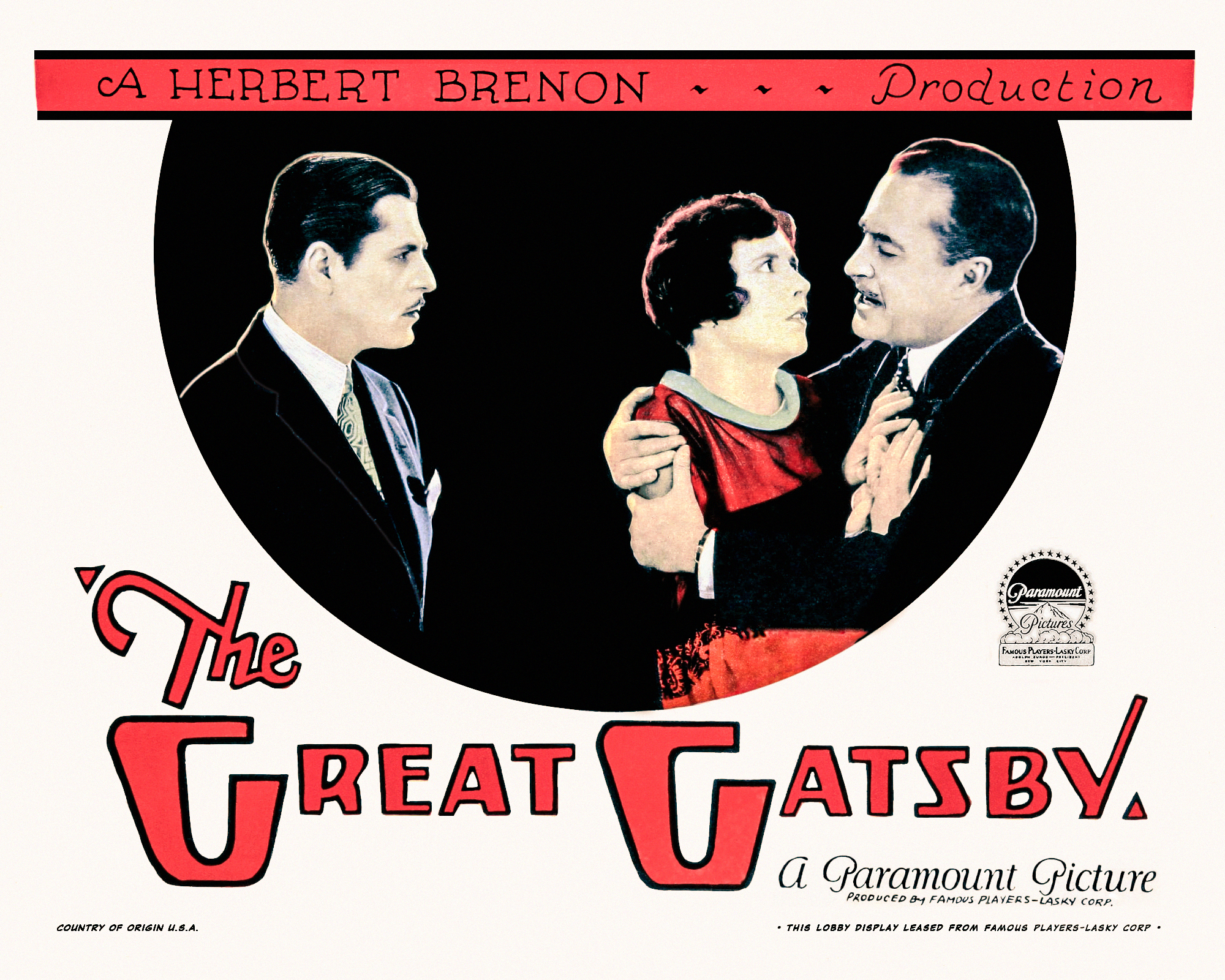
- 1926 theatrical poster
- Directed by: Herbert Brenon
- Written by: Becky Gardiner (scenario); Elizabeth Meehan (adaptation)
- Based on: The Great Gatsby 1925 novel by F. Scott Fitzgerald; The Great Gatsby 1926 play by Owen Davis
- Produced by: Jesse L. Lasky; Adolph Zukor
- Starring: Warner Baxter; Lois Wilson; Neil Hamilton; Georgia Hale; William Powell
- Cinematography: Leo Tover
- Edited by: Edgar Adams
- Production company: Famous Players–Lasky
- Distributed by: Paramount Pictures
- Release date: November 21, 1926
- Running time: 80 minutes
- Country: United States
- Language: Silent (English intertitles)

The Great Gatsby is a 1926 American silent drama film directed by Herbert Brenon. It was the first film adaptation of the 1925 novel of the same name by F. Scott Fitzgerald. Warner Baxter portrayed Jay Gatsby, Lois Wilson portrayed Daisy Buchanan and Neil Hamilton portrayed Nick Carraway. The film was produced by Famous Players–Lasky, and distributed by Paramount Pictures.

The Great Gatsby is now considered lost. A movie trailer displaying short clips of the film still exists.

== Plot ==
Midwesterner Nick Carraway is lured into the lavish world of his mysterious Long Island neighbor, Jay Gatsby. Soon, however, Carraway sees through the cracks of Gatsby's nouveau riche existence, where obsession, madness, and tragedy await.

The film's plot diverges from Fitzgerald's novel in several key respects: Daisy renounces Gatsby when she learns he is a bootlegger as opposed to when he demands she declare that she never loved Tom. Daisy also attempts to confess publicly to killing Myrtle Wilson but fails to do so. Prior to Gatsby's murder by George Wilson, she departs New York City with her husband Tom and, consequently, has no knowledge of Gatsby's death.

The film's final scene shows Daisy and her husband Tom seated together with their child on the porch of their beautiful home, retreating back into their world of money and careless indifference.

== Cast ==
- Warner Baxter as Jay Gatsby
- Lois Wilson as Daisy Buchanan
- Neil Hamilton as Nick Carraway
- Georgia Hale as Myrtle Wilson
- William Powell as George Wilson
- Hale Hamilton as Tom Buchanan
- Carmelita Geraghty as Jordan Baker
- George Nash as Charles Wolf (Note: In this silent version, Jay Gatsby's business associate Meyer Wolfsheim is changed to a White Anglo-Saxon Protestant and rechristened Charles Wolf.)
- Eric Blore as Lord Digby
- Gunboat Smith as Bert
- Claire Whitney as Catherine
- Claude Brooke as Uncredited role
- Nancy Kelly as Uncredited role

== Production ==
The screenplay was written by Becky Gardiner and Elizabeth Meehan and was based on Owen Davis' stage play treatment of The Great Gatsby. The play, directed by George Cukor, opened on Broadway at the Ambassador Theatre on February 2, 1926. Shortly after the play opened, Famous Players–Lasky and Paramount Pictures purchased the film rights for $45,000 (equivalent to $637,000 in 2024).

The film's director Herbert Brenon designed The Great Gatsby as lightweight, popular entertainment, playing up the party scenes at Gatsby's mansion and emphasizing their scandalous elements. The film had a running time of 80 minutes, or 7,296 feet.

== Reception ==
=== Film critics ===
Mordaunt Hall, The New York Times' first regular film critic, wrote in a contemporary review that the film sufficed as "good entertainment, but at the same time it is obvious that it would have benefited by more imaginative direction." He lamented that Herbert Brenon's direction lacked subtlety and that none of the actors convincingly developed their characters. He faulted a scene where Daisy gulps absinthe: "She takes enough of this beverage to render the average person unconscious. Yet she appears only mildly intoxicated, and soon recovers."

Hall described a scene in which Gatsby "tosses twenty-dollar gold pieces into the [swimming pool] water, and you see a number of the girls diving for the coins. A clever bit of comedy is introduced by a girl asking what Gatsby is throwing into the water, and as soon as this creature hears that they are real gold pieces she unhesitatingly plunges into the pool to get a share. Gatsby appears to throw the money into the water with a good deal of interest, whereas it might perhaps have been more effective to have him appear a little bored as he watched the scramble of the men and women."

In contrast to Hall's mixed review, journalist Abel Green's November 1926 review published in Variety was more positive. Green deemed Brenon's production to be "serviceable film material" and "a good, interesting gripping cinema exposition of the type certain to be readily acclaimed by the average fan, with the usual Long Island parties and the rest of those high-hat trimmings thrown in to clinch the argument." Presumably in reaction to Daisy Buchanan rejecting Gatsby when she discovers that he is a bootlegger, the Variety reviewer wryly observed that Gatsby's "Volstead violating" bootlegging was not "a heinous crime despite the existence of a federal statute which declares it so." The reviewer praised Warner Baxter's portrayal of Gatsby and Neil Hamilton's portrayal of Nick Carraway but found Lois Wilson's interpretation of Daisy to be needlessly unsympathetic.

=== Fitzgerald and friends ===
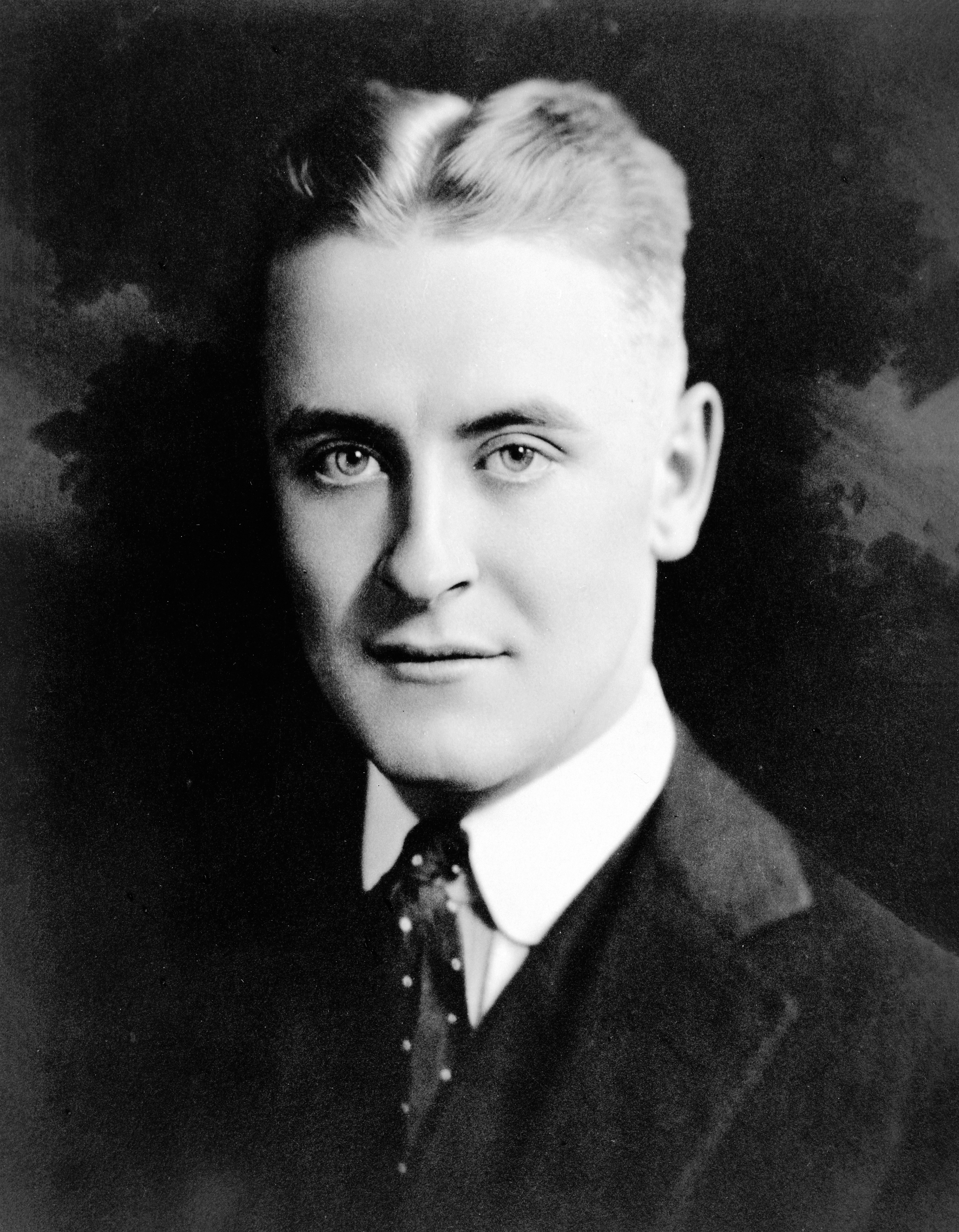
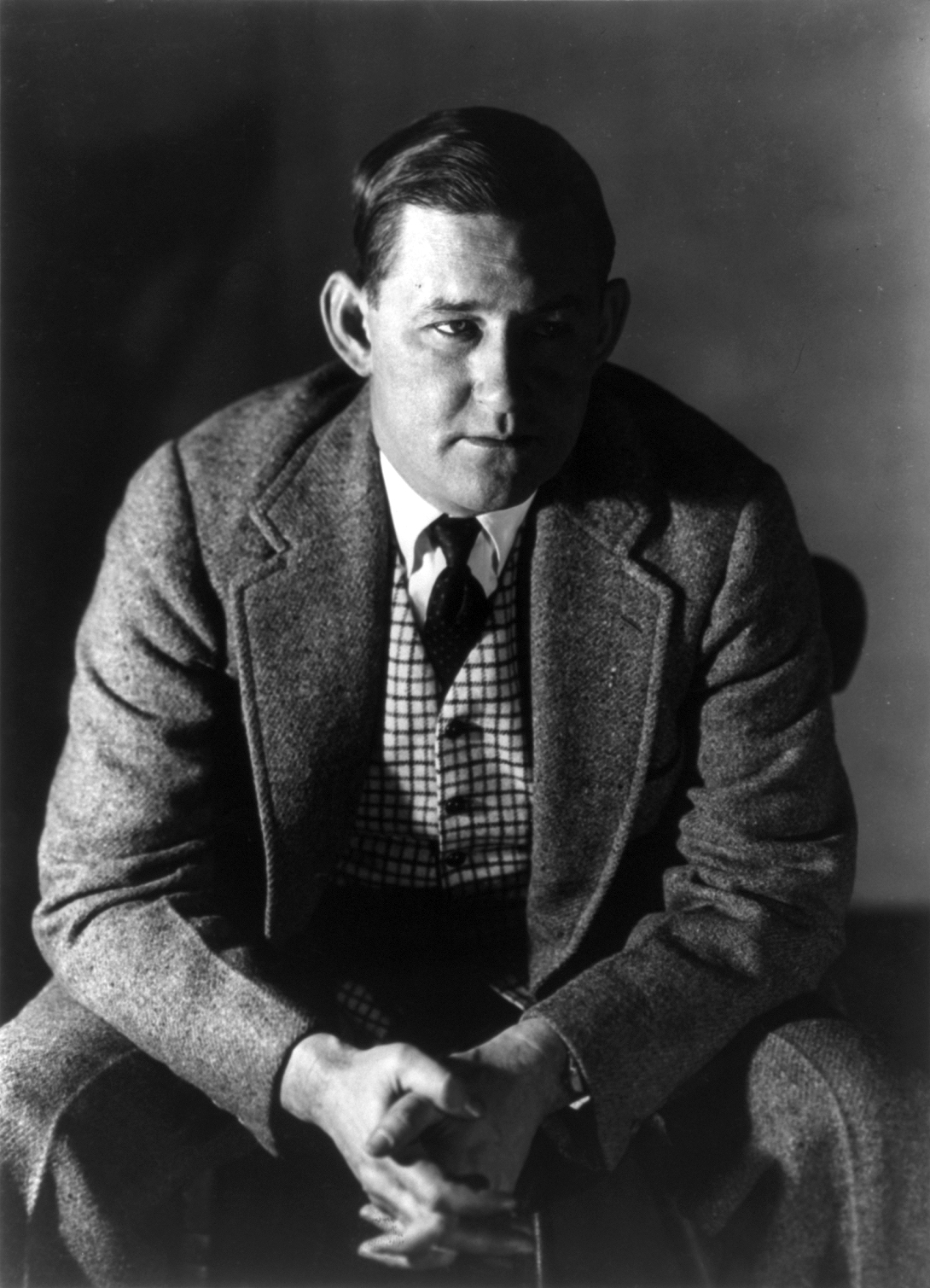
F. Scott Fitzgerald purportedly liked the 1926 film. His friend and fellow writer John O'Hara declared the 1926 adaptation to be "true to the book, true to what Fitzgerald had intended."

Although the film received generally positive reviews from critics, the reception by writer F. Scott Fitzgerald and his wife Zelda Sayre proved more ambivalent. According to actress Lois Wilson, who played Daisy in the film, she met Fitzgerald in Hollywood, and the author indicated he liked the film. "As far as I know, he approved of the film when it was released," Wilson stated in an interview. Supporting this claim, Fitzgerald pasted a positive review of the film in his personal scrapbook.

Fitzgerald's wife Zelda, however, held the film in low regard. While living in a Los Angeles bungalow with his wife Zelda in early 1927, the couple viewed the film at a nearby theater and walked out midway through the screening. "We saw The Great Gatsby at the movies," Zelda later wrote to their daughter Scottie and her nanny. "It's ROTTEN and awful and terrible and we left."

Fitzgerald's friend and fellow writer John O'Hara lavished praise upon the silent film and deemed the work to be superior to the 1949 remake. O'Hara remarked: "Even now I can remember my exultation at the end of the picture when I saw that Paramount had done an honest job, true to the book, true to what Fitzgerald had intended." Following the invention of sound films, O'Hara sought to buy the screen rights from Paramount Pictures in order to write the screenplay for a sound remake. Actor Clark Gable purportedly wished to play the title role in O'Hara's proposed remake and discussed his interest in the project with Fitzgerald, but their efforts did not come to fruition.

=== Civic groups ===
Following the release of the film, women's civic groups such as the Better Films Board of the Women's Council lodged letters of protest to the studio and producers in December 1926. The women objected that the film depicted Daisy Buchanan having sexual relations with Gatsby prior to marriage and that Tom Buchanan was shown engaging in extramarital sex with Myrtle.

The civic group declared that, although "some homes are not sacred, some women not pure and some men not clean," it was nonetheless morally wrong "in the name of amusement to portray stories of this undesirable life, to hold it up before the theater going public for the [morally] weak to become interested in." They demanded that future motion pictures depict "the decent, clean American life, which if our nation is to stand, must remain clean and decent as it was at the beginning of our Republic."

== Preservation status ==
The 1926 film trailer—the only surviving footage of the now lost film

According to RKO Pictures screenwriter DeWitt Bodeen, he viewed the badly damaged master of the 1926 film at Paramount Pictures' studio archive shortly before pre-production began on the 1949 remake starring Alan Ladd, Betty Field, and Macdonald Carey. Bodeen described the film as in such bad condition by 1947 that it could not be easily viewed, foreshadowing its eventual loss:

In 1947, when I thought RKO might not pick up my option as a contract writer, I let myself be wooed by Paramount, going into their library on Saturdays and perusing their story files for likely properties that had never been filmed or were ripe for remake. Heading a list of about ten such titles on my list was The Great Gatsby; for Paramount had the right actor for it then, I thought, in Alan Ladd. D. A. Doran, head of the story department, set up a screening of the 1926 film, and the print kept breaking so I'm not surprised that it's now listed as "lost."

In 2003, Wheeler Winston Dixon, the James Ryan Professor of Film Studies at the University of Nebraska–Lincoln, made extensive but unsuccessful attempts to find a surviving print of the 1926 version. Dixon noted that there were rumors that a copy survived in an unknown archive in Moscow but dismissed these rumors as unfounded.

A trailer survives and is one of the 50 films in the three-disc, boxed DVD set More Treasures from American Film Archives, 1894-1931 (2004), compiled by the National Film Preservation Foundation from five American film archives. The trailer is preserved by the Library of Congress (AFI/Jack Tillmany collection) and has a running time of one minute. It was featured on the Blu-ray released by Warner Home Video of director Baz Luhrmann's 2013 adaptation of The Great Gatsby as a special feature.

== Gallery ==
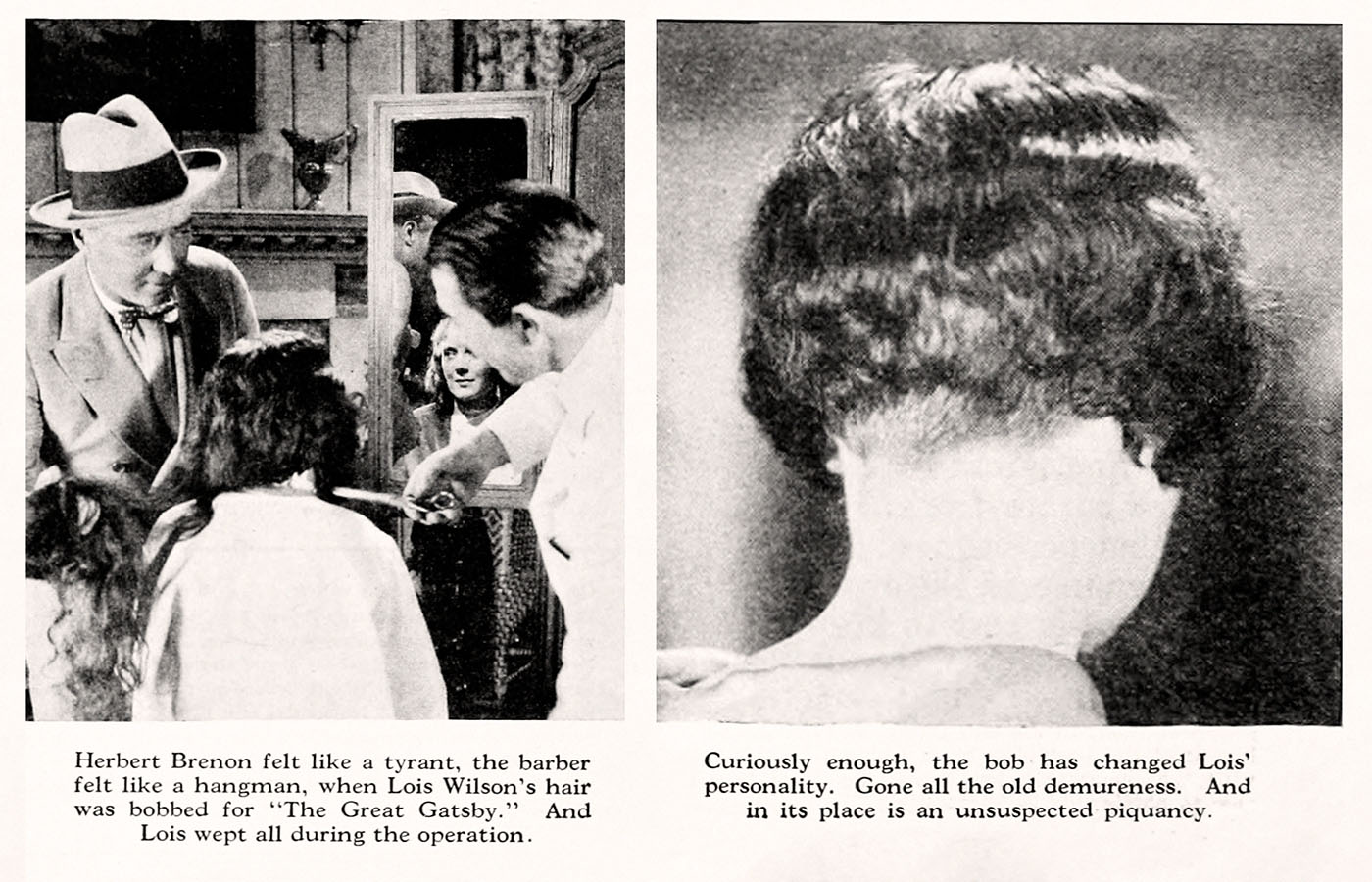
Behind-the-scenes photo of actress Lois Wilson with director Herbert Brenon

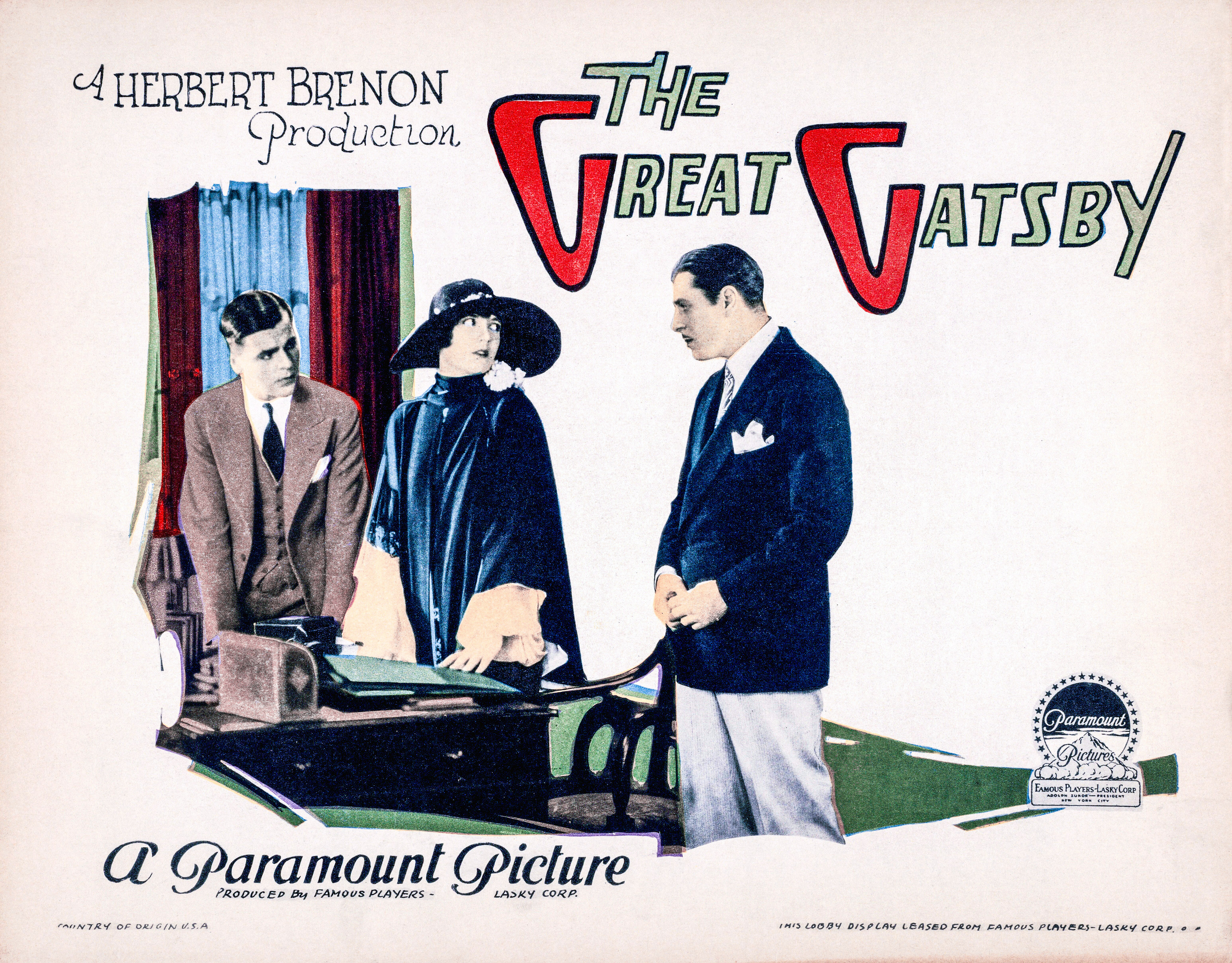
A 1926 lobby card for the film

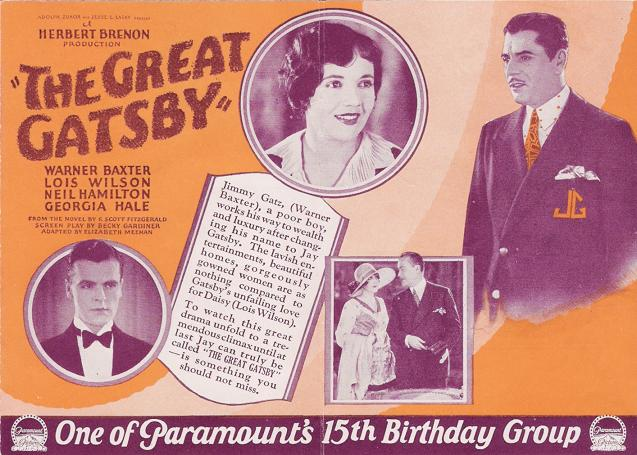
A 1926 lobby card for the film

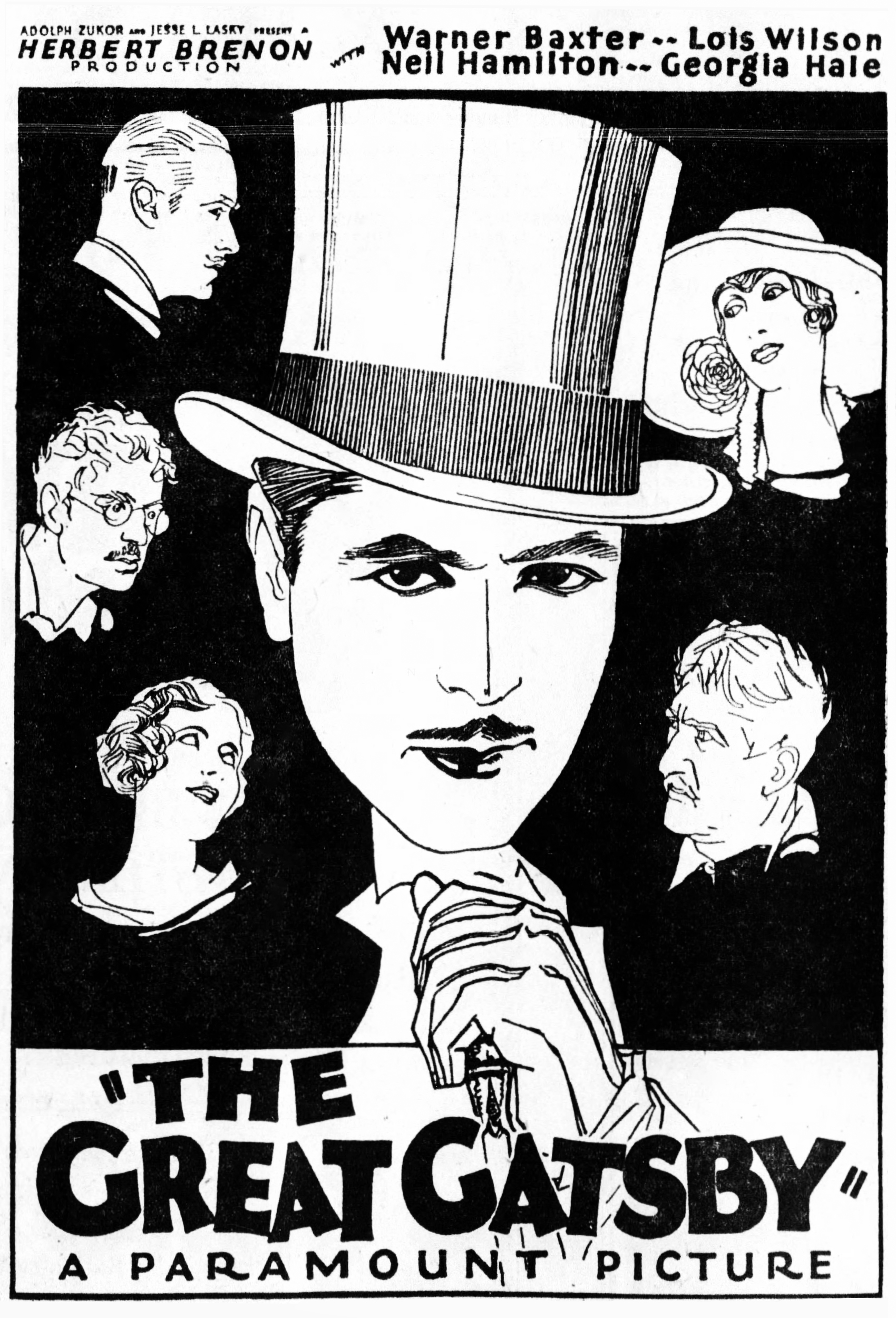
Film advertisement

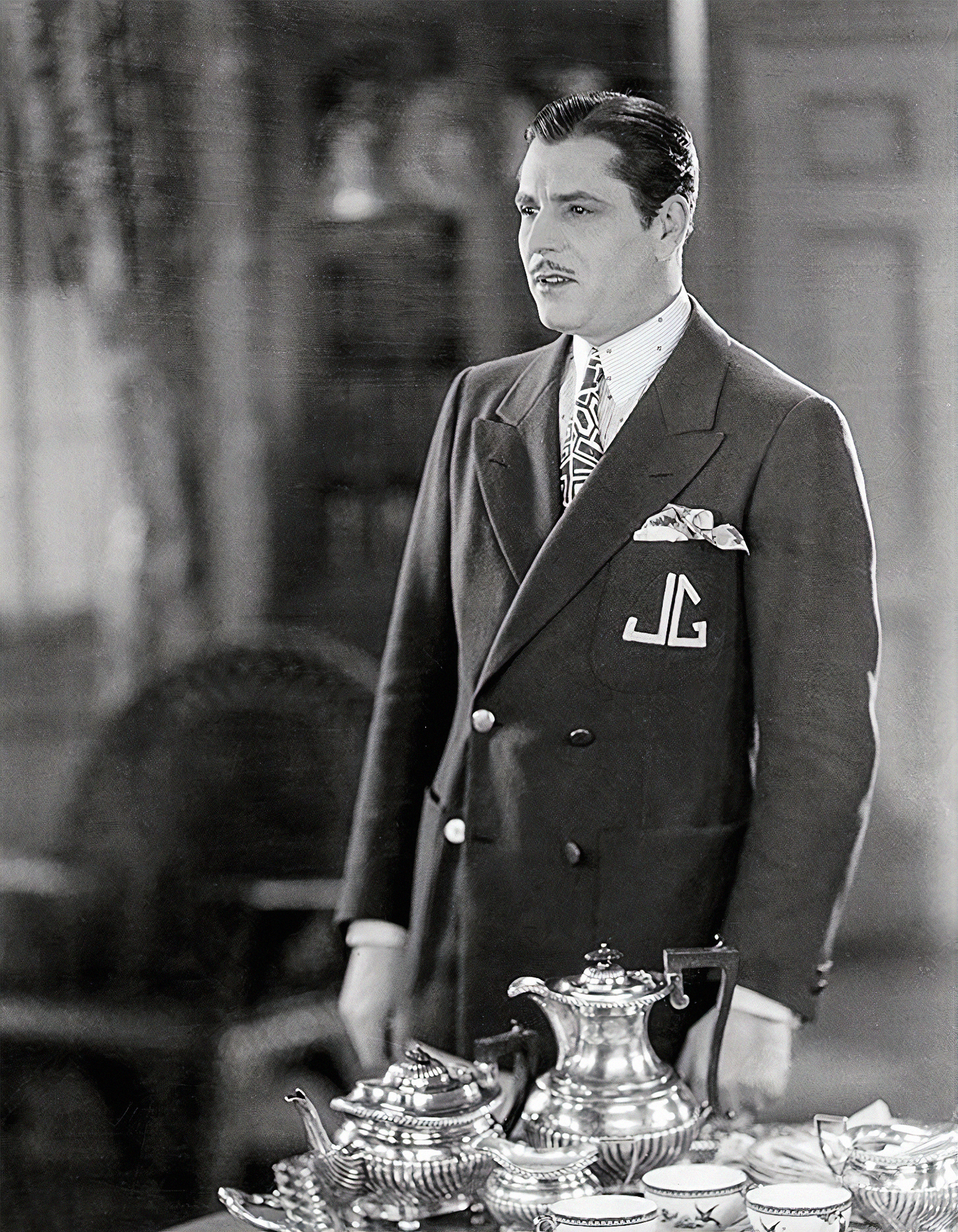
Publicity still of Warner Baxter as Jay Gatsby

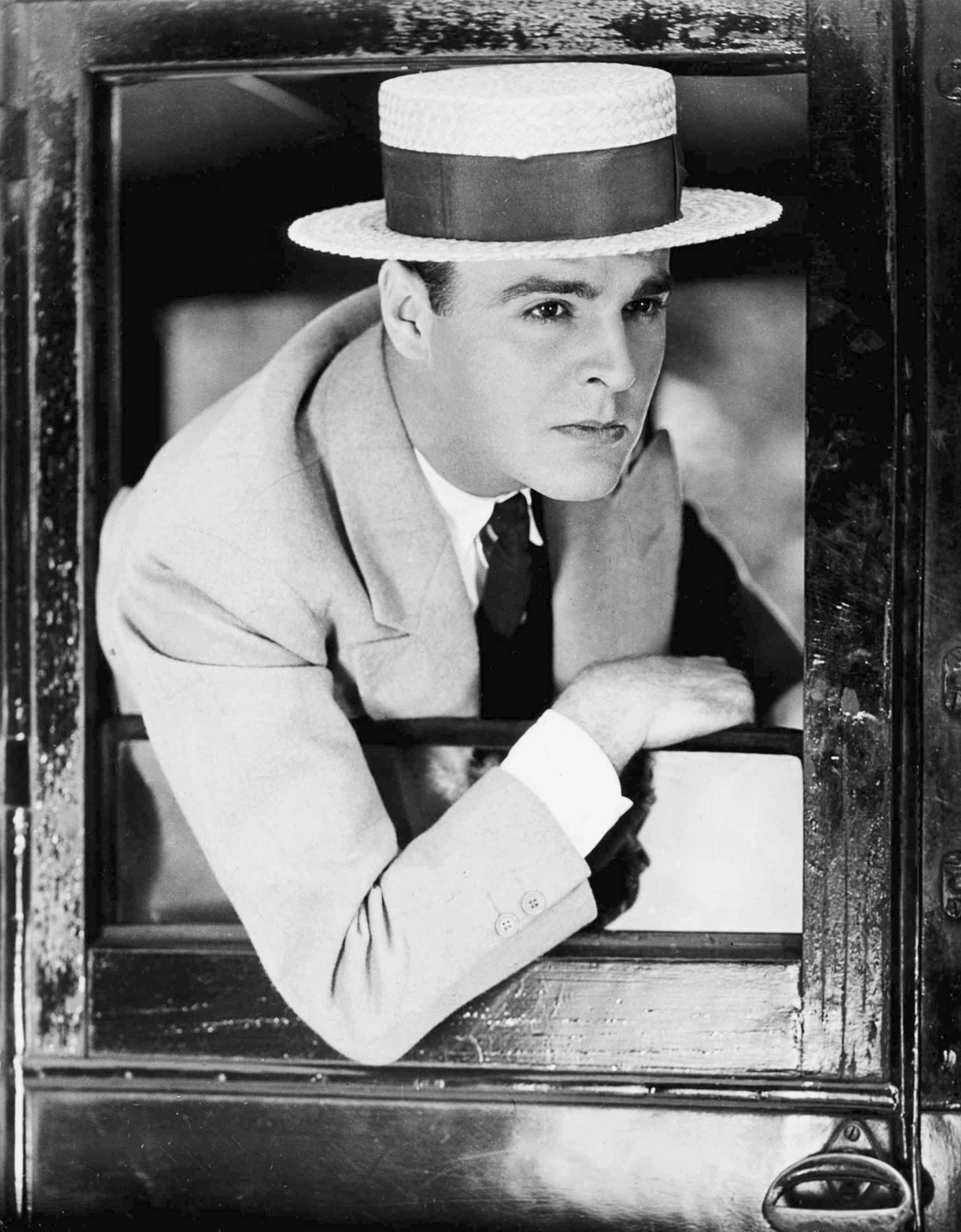
Publicity still of Neil Hamilton as Nick Carraway

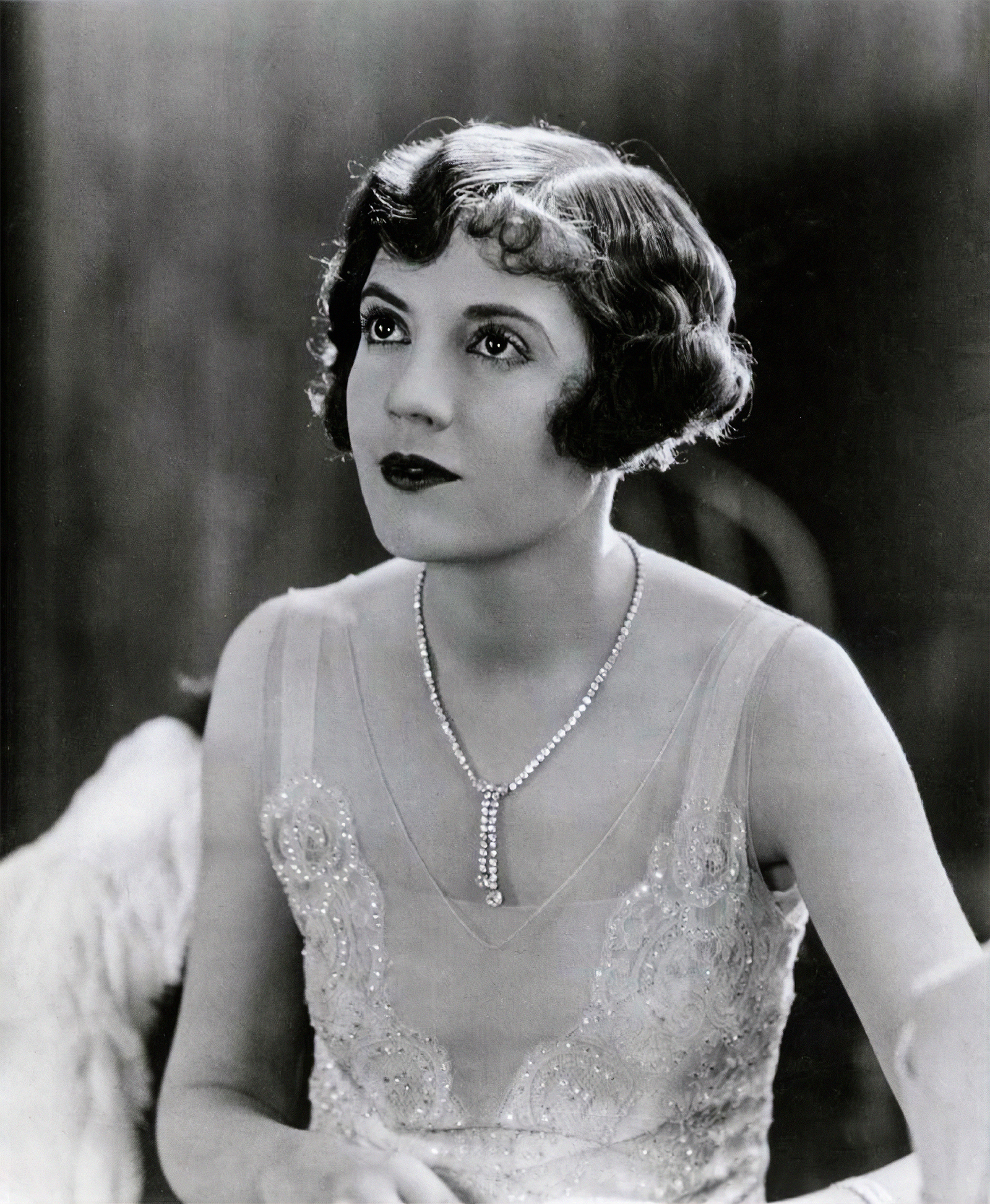
Publicity still of Lois Wilson as Daisy Buchanan

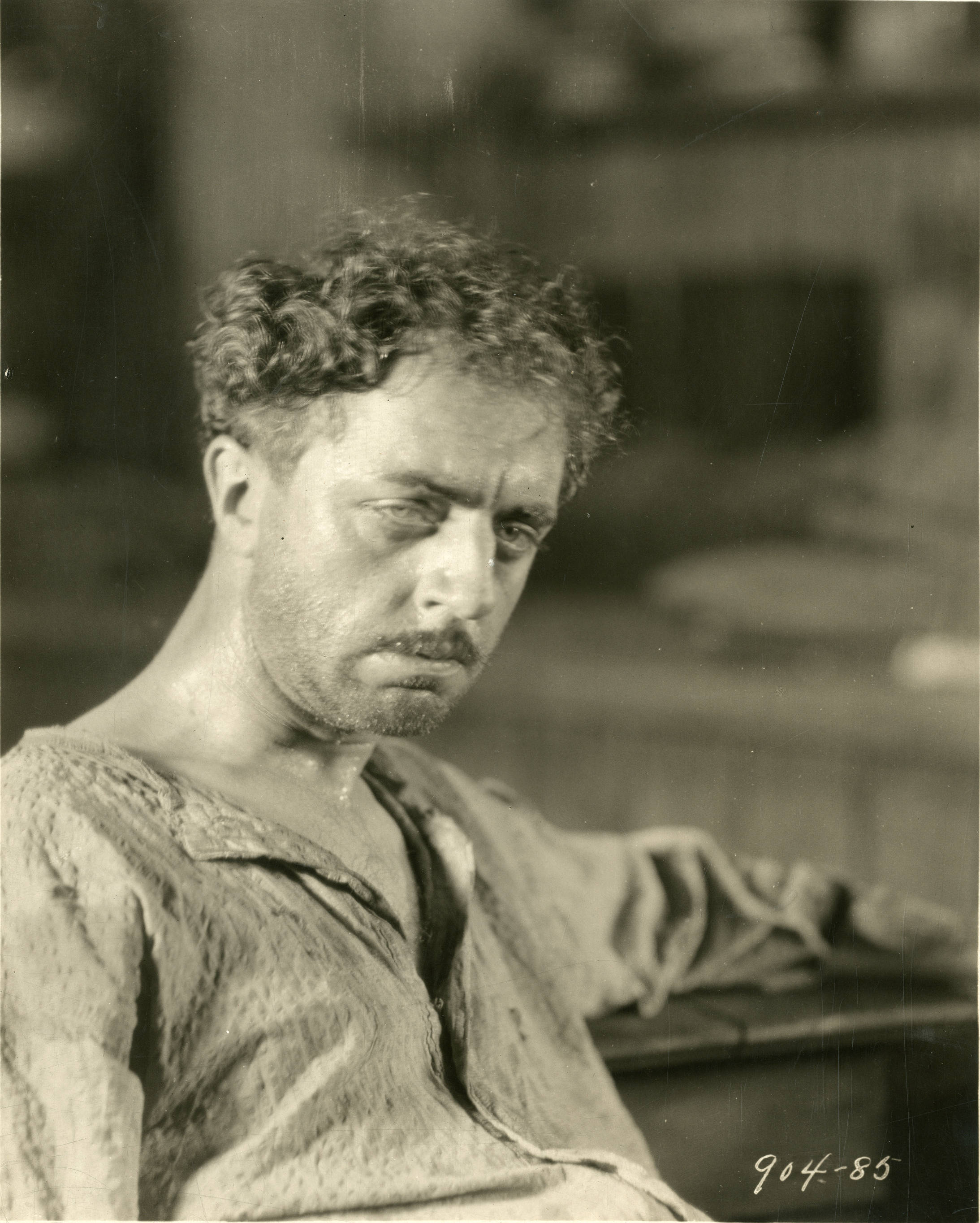
Publicity still of William Powell as George Wilson

== See also ==
- Adaptations of The Great Gatsby
