= Francis Cugat =

Painter and graphic designer

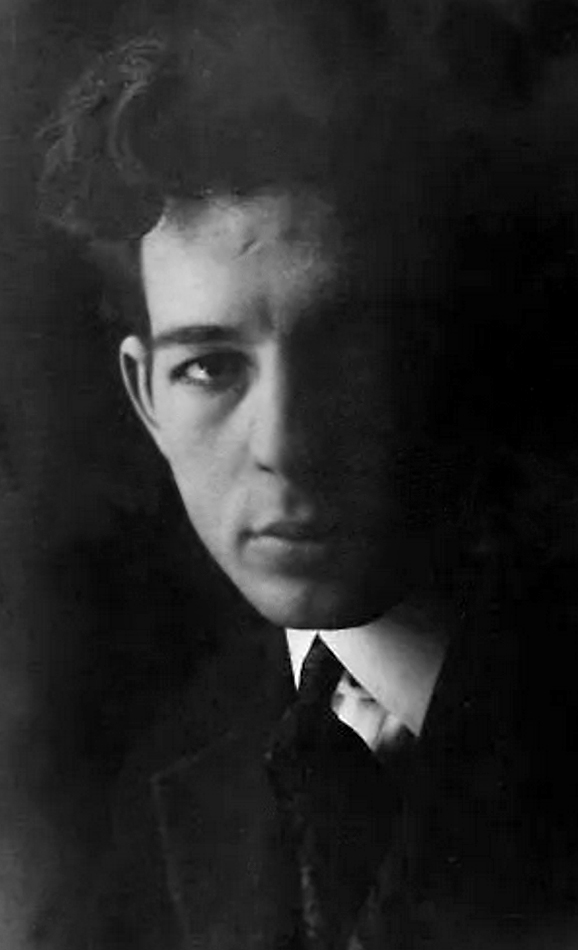
- Francis Cugat in 1917
- Born: Francisco Coradal-Cougat; May 24, 1893; Barcelona, Spain
- Died: July 13, 1981 (aged 88); Westport, Connecticut, U.S.
- Relatives: Xavier Cugat (brother)

Francis Cugat, also known as Francisco Coradal-Cougat (May 24, 1893 – July 13, 1981), was a painter and graphic designer whose most famous work was Celestial Eyes, the original 1925 dust jacket for The Great Gatsby by F. Scott Fitzgerald. From the mid-1940s he was a Technicolor consultant on more than 60 Hollywood films.

== Biography ==
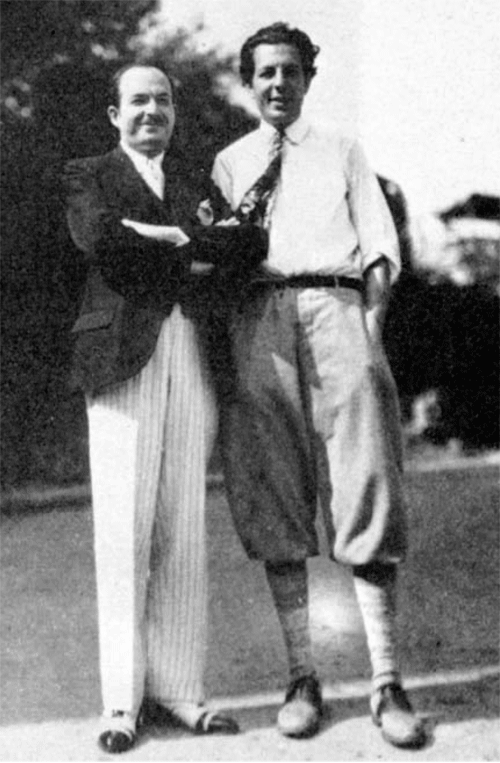
Francis Cugat (right) with his younger brother, bandleader Xavier Cugat

Francis Cugat was born in Barcelona in 1893, an older brother of Xavier Cugat. The Cugat family emigrated to Cuba in 1903. Cugat studied at the academy at Rheims, and then in Paris at the Ecole des Beaux Arts. He became known as a portrait painter in France, South America, and Cuba before coming to the United States.

Between 1915 and 1918, Cugat created distinctive, stylized theatre cards for several opera personalities including Lucien Muratore, Rosa Raisa and Giacomo Rimini. These visually dramatic posters were the result of Cugat's having been discovered by Cleofonte Campannini in Chicago. Cugat came to the general director of the opera asking for the commission to paint poster portraits of the Chicago Opera Association stars. He continued in this endeavor, painting Nellie Melba, as well.

Cugat's earliest film work includes Robert Z. Leonard's now-lost 1922 film Fascination, for which he was retained to assure the authenticity of the art direction. "It is one of the rules of theatrical presentation that none of the real-life incongruities of background will be reproduced in a picture", Leonard said. "So we have sought to make each bit of furniture, each painting on the walls, all of the household utensils, all of the café settings, and so on, thoroughly 'Spanish'. And Señor Cugat is authority for the fact that we have succeeded." He designed sets for the Douglas Fairbanks motion pictures Don Q, Son of Zorro (1925) and The Gaucho (1927).

In the early 1920s Cugat continued his artistic career in New York City. Cugat moved to Hollywood in 1925. For many years, Cugat was a designer in Hollywood for Douglas Fairbanks and had a 1942 show in New York, well after his famous work for The Great Gatsby. He was credited for technical work on 68 Hollywood films.

On November 28, 1922, in New York City, Cugat was married to the painter Ruth Wadler (b. New York), the sister of Lucille Lortel, founder of the White Barn Theatre. He died in Westport, Connecticut, on July 13, 1981, aged 88.

== Known work ==
Cugat's illustration for the dust jacket of The Great Gatsby (1925), Celestial Eyes

- Murtore, Raisa and Rimini Theatre Cards – 1915–1917
- Untitled illustration of woman with candle and dandy, n.d., circa 1915–1917
- Celestial Eyes – A painting for the cover of the 1925 novel The Great Gatsby, by F. Scott Fitzgerald.
- "George Gershwin" (An American in Paris) – c. 1928, Etching.
- Technicolor Color Associate Director for the Frank Borzage/Philip Dorn 1946 film I’ve Always Loved You
- Technicolor Color Consultant for the John Ford/John Wayne 1952 film The Quiet Man
- Technicolor Color Consultant for the 1955 film Three for the Show
- French Quarter, New Orleans, landscape painting, n.d.
- The Stranger, Western film 1953
- Bridgetoan Harbor, Barbados, landscape painting, n.d.
- Moonlight c. 1926, oil painting, current location unknown.
