= The Great Gatsby =

1925 novel by F. Scott Fitzgerald

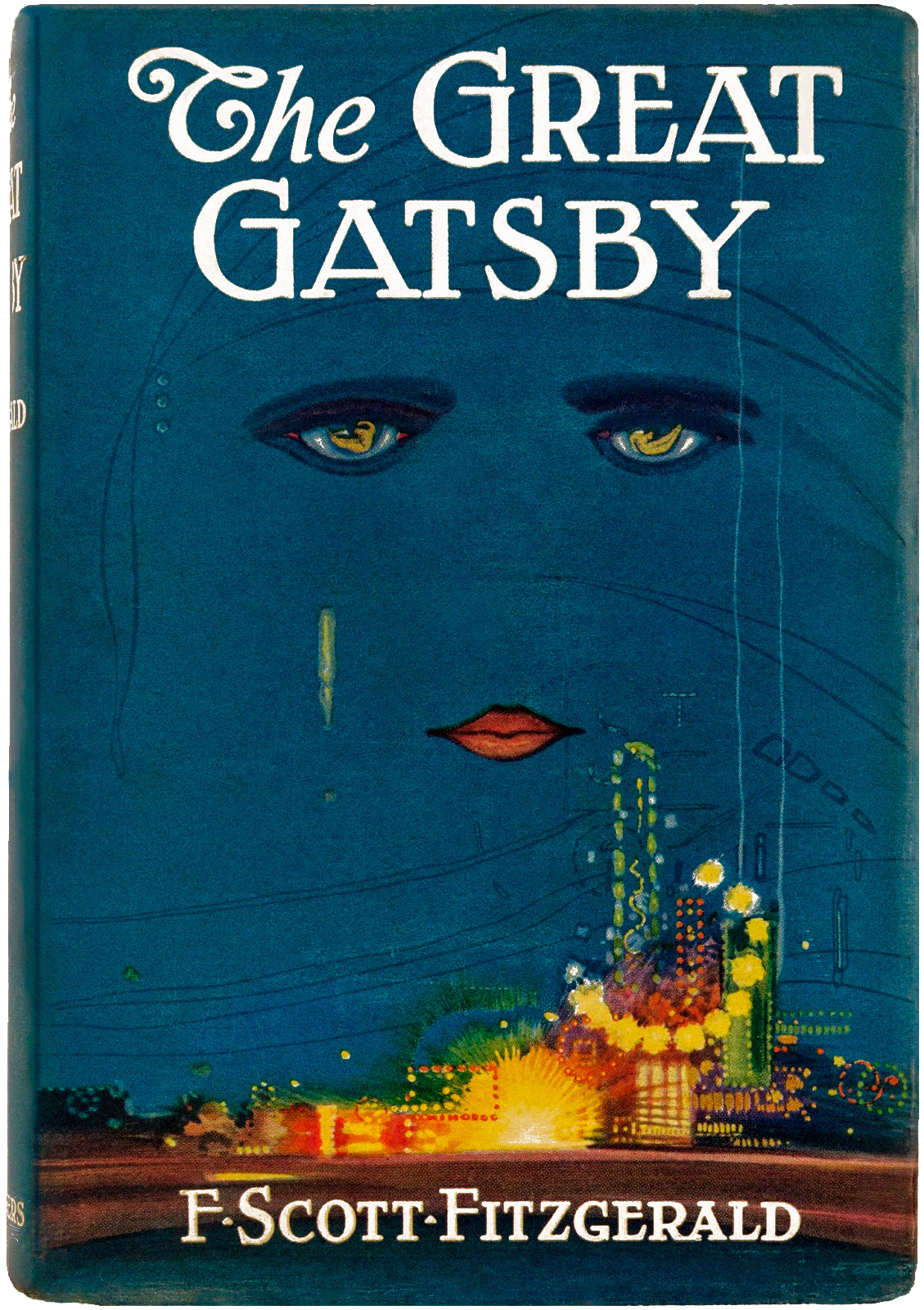
- The front dust jacket art of the first edition, known as Celestial Eyes
- Author: F. Scott Fitzgerald
- Cover artist: Francis Cugat
- Language: English
- Genre: Tragedy
- Published: April 10, 1925
- Publisher: Charles Scribner's Sons
- Publication place: United States
- Media type: Print (hardcover & paperback)
- Preceded by: The Beautiful and Damned (1922)
- Followed by: Tender Is the Night (1934)
- Text: The Great Gatsby at Wikisource

The Great Gatsby (/ɡæts.biː/) is a 1925 tragedy novel by American writer F. Scott Fitzgerald. Set in the Jazz Age on Long Island, near New York City, the novel depicts first-person narrator Nick Carraway's interactions with Jay Gatsby, a mysterious millionaire obsessed with reuniting with his former lover, Daisy Buchanan.

The novel was inspired by a youthful romance Fitzgerald had with socialite Ginevra King and the riotous parties he attended on Long Island's North Shore in 1922. Following a move to the French Riviera, Fitzgerald completed a rough draft of the novel in 1924. He submitted it to editor Maxwell Perkins, who persuaded Fitzgerald to revise the work over the following winter. After making revisions, Fitzgerald was satisfied with the text but remained ambivalent about the book's title and considered several alternatives. Painter Francis Cugat's dust jacket art, named Celestial Eyes, greatly impressed Fitzgerald, and he incorporated its imagery into the novel.

After its publication by Scribner's in April 1925, The Great Gatsby received generally favorable reviews, though some literary critics believed it did not equal Fitzgerald's previous efforts. Compared to his earlier novels, This Side of Paradise (1920) and The Beautiful and Damned (1922), the novel was a commercial disappointment. It sold fewer than 20,000 copies by October, and Fitzgerald's hopes of a monetary windfall from the novel were unrealized. When Fitzgerald died in 1940, he believed himself to be a failure and his work forgotten.

During World War II, the novel experienced an abrupt surge in popularity when the Council on Books in Wartime distributed free copies to American soldiers serving overseas. This new-found popularity launched a critical and scholarly re-examination, and the work soon became a core part of most American high school curricula and a part of American popular culture. Numerous stage and film adaptations followed in the subsequent decades.

Gatsby continues to attract popular and scholarly attention. Scholars emphasize the novel's treatment of social class, inherited versus self-made wealth, gender, race, and environmentalism, as well as its cynical attitude towards the American Dream. The Great Gatsby is widely considered to be a literary masterpiece and a contender for the title of the Great American Novel.

== Historical and biographical context ==
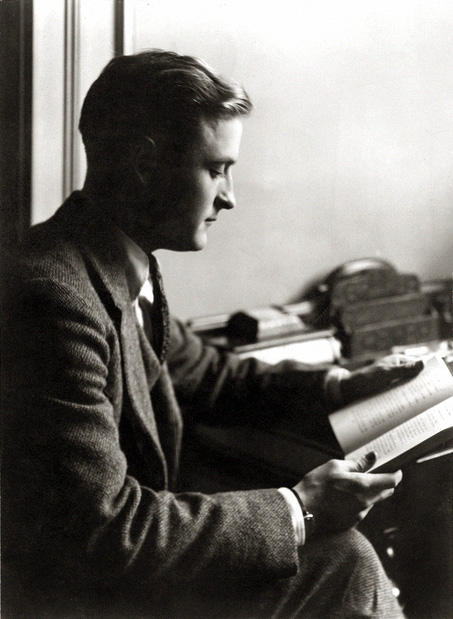
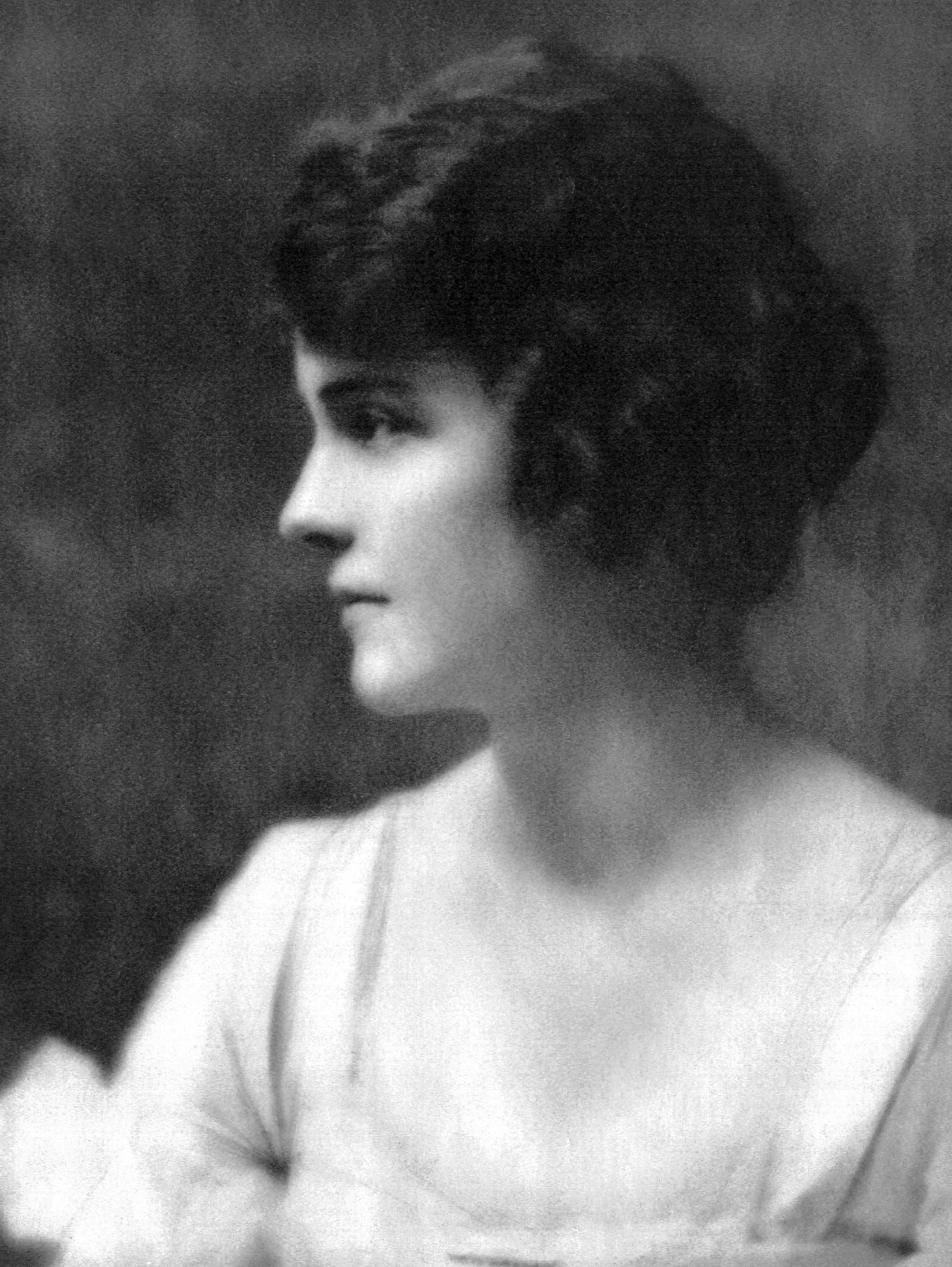
F. Scott Fitzgerald's romance and life-long obsession with socialite Ginevra King informed the plot of the novel. King was fêted in the press as among Chicago's most desirable debutantes and inspired the character of Daisy Buchanan.

Set on the prosperous Long Island of 1922, The Great Gatsby provides a critical social history of Prohibition-era America during the Jazz Age. (Note: Historian Jeff Nilsson described F. Scott Fitzgerald as the poet laureate of the Jazz Age, "the most raucous, gaudy era in U.S. history".) F. Scott Fitzgerald's fictional narrative fully renders that period—known for its jazz music, economic prosperity, flapper culture, libertine mores, rebellious youth, and ubiquitous speakeasies. Fitzgerald uses many of these 1920s societal developments to tell his story, from simple details like petting in automobiles to broader themes such as bootlegging as the illicit source of Gatsby's fortune.

Fitzgerald conveys the hedonism of Jazz Age society by following a down-to-earth narrator as a spectator of the flashiest and most raucous era in American history. In Fitzgerald's eyes, the era represented a morally permissive time when Americans of all ages became disillusioned with prevailing social norms and obsessed with pleasure-seeking. Fitzgerald himself had a certain ambivalence towards the Jazz Age, an era whose themes he would later regard as reflective of events in his own life.

The Great Gatsby reflects various events in Fitzgerald's youth. He was a young Midwesterner from Minnesota. He was educated at Princeton, an Ivy League school, like the novel's narrator, who went to Yale. In 1915, the 18-year-old Fitzgerald met Ginevra King, a 16-year-old socialite with whom he fell deeply in love. Although Ginevra was madly in love with him, her upper-class family openly discouraged his courtship of their daughter because of his lower-class status, and her father purportedly told him that "poor boys shouldn't think of marrying rich girls".

Rejected by Ginevra's family as a suitor because of his lack of financial prospects, a suicidal Fitzgerald enlisted in the United States Army amid World War I and was commissioned as a second lieutenant. While awaiting deployment to the Western front where he hoped to die in combat, he was stationed at Camp Sheridan in Montgomery, Alabama, where he met Zelda Sayre, a vivacious 17-year-old Southern belle. After learning that Ginevra had married wealthy Chicago businessman William "Bill" Mitchell, Fitzgerald asked Zelda to marry him. Zelda agreed, but postponed their marriage until he became financially successful. Fitzgerald is thus similar to Jay Gatsby in that he became engaged while a military officer stationed far from home and then sought immense wealth in order to provide for the lifestyle to which his fiancée had become accustomed. (Note: As a Southern belle, Zelda Sayre's wealthy family employed half-a-dozen domestic servants, many of whom were African-American. She was unaccustomed to domestic labor of any kind and delegated all tasks to her servants.)

After his success as a short-story writer and as a novelist, Fitzgerald married Zelda in New York City, and the newly-wed couple soon relocated to Long Island. Despite enjoying the exclusive Long Island milieu, Fitzgerald quietly disapproved of the extravagant parties, and the wealthy persons he encountered often disappointed him. While striving to emulate the rich, he found their privileged lifestyle to be morally disquieting. Although Fitzgerald—like Gatsby—had always admired the rich, he nonetheless possessed a smoldering resentment towards them.

== Plot summary ==
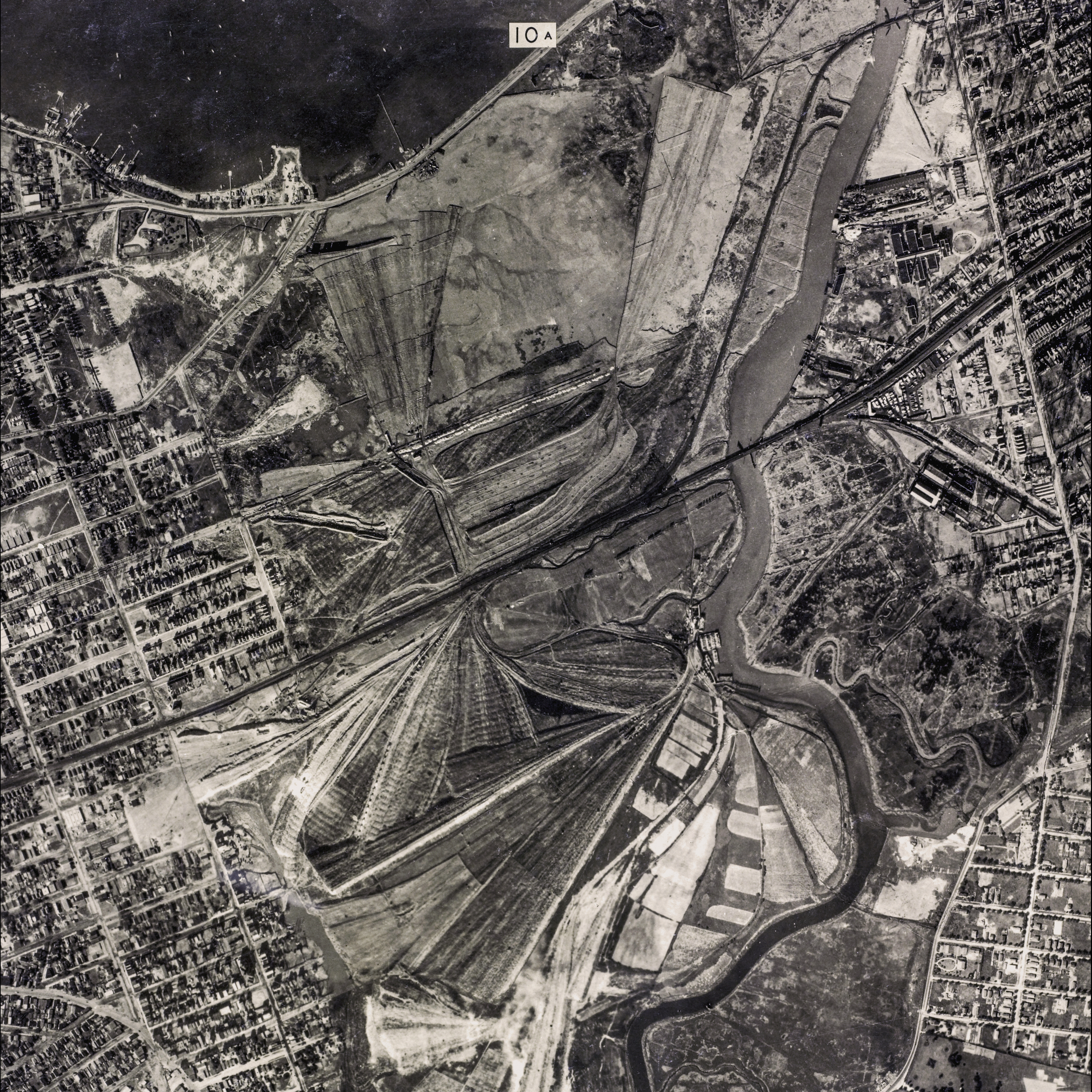
George Wilson and his wife Myrtle live in the "valley of ashes", a refuse dump (shown in the above photograph) historically located in New York City during the 1920s. Today, the area is Flushing Meadows–Corona Park.

In spring 1922, Nick Carraway—a Yale alumnus from the Midwest and a World War I veteran—journeys to New York City to obtain employment as a bond salesman. He rents a bungalow in the Long Island village of West Egg, next to a luxurious estate inhabited by Jay Gatsby, an enigmatic multi-millionaire who hosts dazzling soirées, yet does not partake in them.

One evening, Nick dines with a distant cousin, Daisy Buchanan, in the old money town of East Egg. Daisy is married to Tom Buchanan, formerly a Yale football star whom Nick knew during his college days. The couple has recently relocated from Chicago to a mansion directly across the bay from Gatsby's estate. There, Nick encounters Jordan Baker, an insolent flapper and golf champion who is a childhood friend of Daisy's. Jordan confides to Nick that Tom keeps a mistress, who brazenly telephones him at his home and lives in the "valley of ashes", a sprawling refuse dump. That evening, Nick sees Gatsby standing alone on his lawn, staring at a green light across the bay.

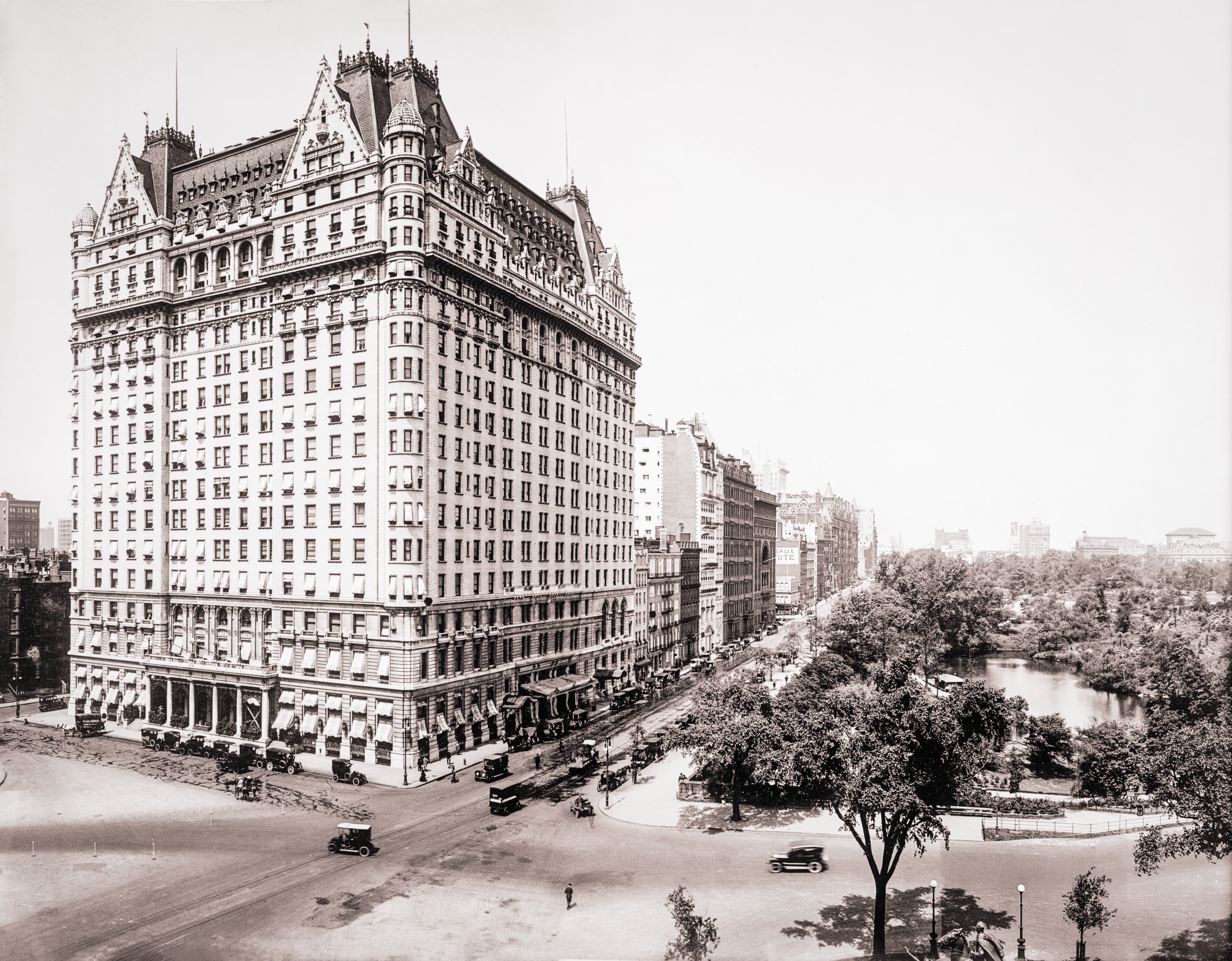
The confrontation between Gatsby and Tom occurs in the twenty-story Plaza Hotel, a château-like edifice with an architectural style inspired by the French Renaissance.

Days later, Nick reluctantly accompanies a drunken and agitated Tom to New York City by train. En route, they stop at a garage inhabited by mechanic George Wilson and his wife—and Tom's mistress—Myrtle. Myrtle joins them, and the trio proceeds to a small New York apartment that Tom has rented for trysts with her. Guests arrive and a party ensues, which ends with Tom slapping Myrtle and breaking her nose after she mentions Daisy.

One morning, Nick receives a formal invitation to a party at Gatsby's mansion. Once there, Nick is embarrassed that he recognizes no one and begins drinking heavily until he encounters Jordan. While chatting with her, he is approached by a man who introduces himself as Jay Gatsby and insists that both he and Nick served in the 3rd Infantry Division (Note: In the original 1925 edition, Fitzgerald wrote that Gatsby and Nick served in the First Division. Fitzgerald revised the text in later editions to be the Third Division.) during the war. Gatsby attempts to ingratiate himself with Nick and when Nick leaves the party, he notices Gatsby watching him.

In late July, Nick and Gatsby have lunch at a speakeasy. Gatsby tries impressing Nick with tales of his war heroism and his Oxford days. Afterward, Nick meets Jordan again at the Plaza Hotel. Jordan reveals that Gatsby and Daisy met around 1917 when Gatsby was an officer in the American Expeditionary Forces. They fell in love, but when Gatsby was deployed overseas, Daisy reluctantly married Tom. Gatsby hopes that his newfound wealth and dazzling parties will make Daisy reconsider. Gatsby uses Nick to stage a reunion with Daisy, and the two embark upon an affair.

In September, Tom discovers the affair when Daisy carelessly addresses Gatsby with unabashed intimacy in front of him. Later, at a Plaza Hotel suite, Gatsby and Tom argue about the affair. Gatsby insists Daisy declare that she never loved Tom. Daisy claims she loves Tom and Gatsby, upsetting both. Tom reveals Gatsby is a swindler whose money comes from bootlegging alcohol. Upon hearing this, Daisy chooses to stay with Tom. Tom scornfully tells Gatsby to drive her home, knowing that Daisy will never leave him.

While returning to East Egg, Gatsby and Daisy drive by Wilson's garage and their car strikes Myrtle, killing her instantly. Later Gatsby reveals to Nick that Daisy was driving the car, but that he intends to take the blame for the accident to protect her. Nick urges Gatsby to flee to avoid prosecution, but he refuses. After Tom tells George that Gatsby owns the car that struck Myrtle, a distraught George assumes the owner of the vehicle must be Myrtle's lover. George fatally shoots Gatsby in his mansion's swimming pool, then kills himself.

Several days after Gatsby's murder, his father Henry Gatz arrives for the sparsely attended funeral. After Gatsby's death, Nick comes to hate New York and decides that Gatsby, Daisy, Tom, and he were all Midwesterners unsuited to Eastern life. (Note: Throughout the novel, Fitzgerald identifies his native region of the Midwest—those "towns beyond the Ohio"—with the perceived virtuousness and rustic simplicity of the American West and as culturally distinct from the decadent values of the eastern United States.) Nick encounters Tom and initially refuses to shake his hand. Tom admits he was the one who told George that Gatsby owned the vehicle that killed Myrtle. Before returning to the Midwest, Nick returns to Gatsby's mansion and stares across the bay at the green light emanating from the end of Daisy's dock.

== Major characters ==
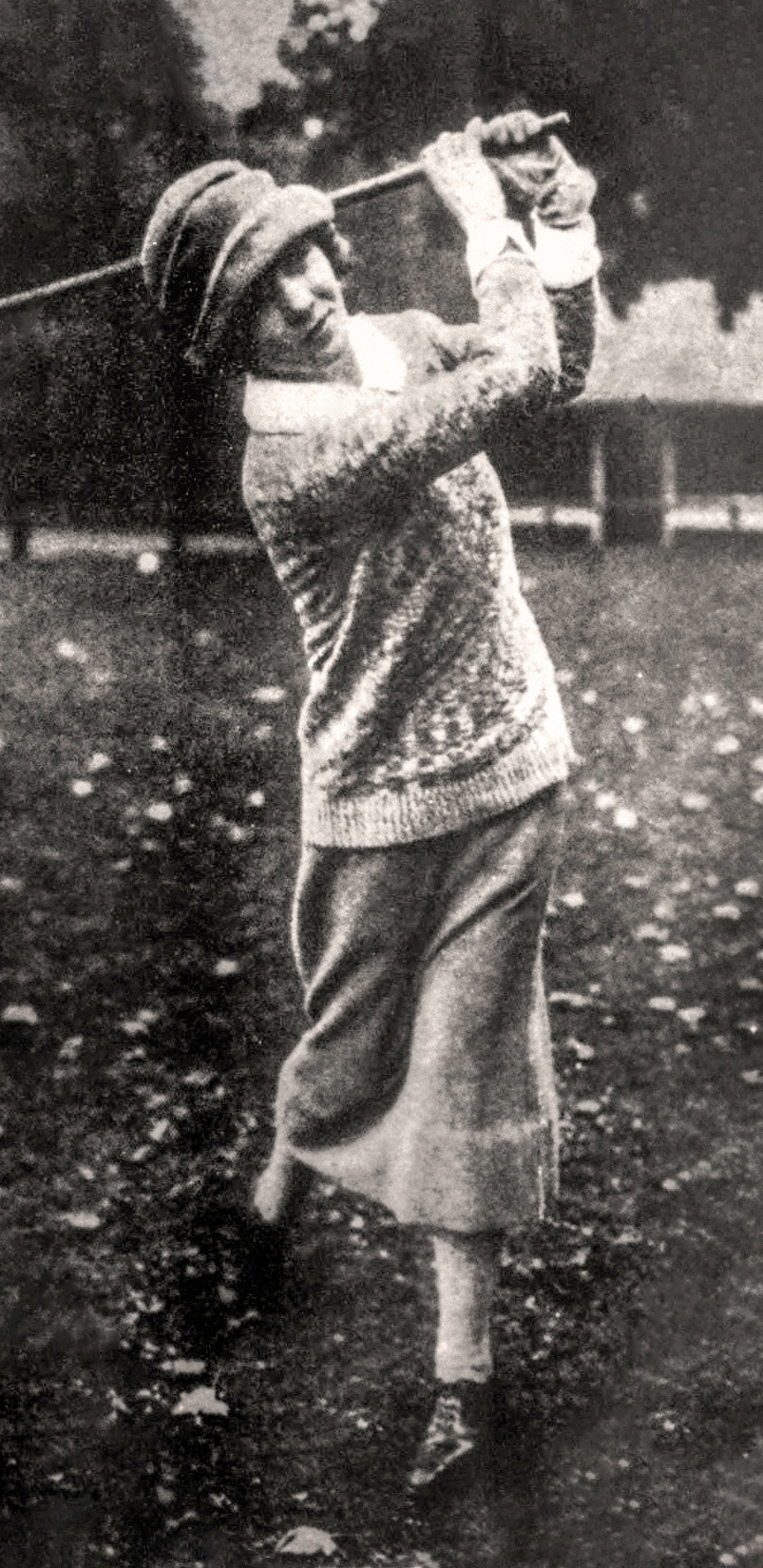
Edith Cummings, a premier amateur golfer, inspired the character of Jordan Baker. A friend of Ginevra King, she was one of Chicago's famous debutantes in the Jazz Age.
- Nick Carraway — a Yale University alumnus from the Midwest, a World War I veteran, and a newly arrived resident of West Egg, age 29 (later 30) who serves as the first-person narrator. He is Gatsby's neighbor and a bond salesman. Nick is easy-going and optimistic, although this latter quality fades as the novel progresses. He ultimately returns to the Midwest after despairing of the decadence and indifference of the eastern United States.
- Jay Gatsby (originally James "Jimmy" Gatz) — a young, mysterious millionaire with shady business connections (later revealed to be a bootlegger), originally from North Dakota. During World War I, when he was a young military officer stationed at the United States Army's Camp Taylor in Louisville, Kentucky, Gatsby encountered the love of his life, the debutante Daisy Buchanan. Later, after the war, he studied briefly at Trinity College, Oxford, in England. According to Fitzgerald's wife Zelda, he partly based Gatsby on their enigmatic Long Island neighbor, Max Gerlach. A military veteran, Gerlach became a self-made millionaire due to his bootlegging endeavors and was fond of using the phrase "old sport" in his letters to Fitzgerald.
- Daisy Buchanan — a shallow, self-absorbed, and young debutante and socialite from Louisville, Kentucky, identified as a flapper. She is Nick's second cousin, once removed, and the wife of Tom Buchanan. Before marrying Tom, Daisy had a romantic relationship with Gatsby. Her choice between Gatsby and Tom is one of the novel's central conflicts. Fitzgerald's romance and life-long obsession with Ginevra King inspired the character of Daisy.
- Thomas "Tom" Buchanan — Daisy's husband, a millionaire who lives in East Egg. Tom is an imposing man of muscular build with a gruff voice and contemptuous demeanor. He was a football star at Yale and is a white supremacist. Among other literary models, (Note: Another possible model for Tom Buchanan was Southern polo champion and aviator Tommy Hitchcock Jr., whom Fitzgerald met at Long Island parties while in New York.) Tom has certain parallels with William "Bill" Mitchell, the Chicago businessman who married Ginevra King. Tom and Mitchell were both Chicagoans with an interest in polo. Also, like Ginevra's father Charles King, whom Fitzgerald resented, Tom is an imperious Yale man and polo player from Lake Forest, Illinois.
- Jordan Baker — an amateur golfer with a sarcastic streak and an aloof attitude, and Daisy's long-time friend. She is Nick Carraway's girlfriend for part of the novel, though they grow apart towards the end. Rumors that she had cheated in a tournament have harmed her reputation both socially and as a golfer. Fitzgerald based Jordan on Ginevra's friend Edith Cummings, a premier amateur golfer known in the press as "The Fairway Flapper". Unlike Jordan Baker, Cummings was never suspected of cheating. The character's name is a play on two popular automobile brands, the Jordan Motor Car Company and the Baker Motor Vehicle, both of Cleveland, Ohio, alluding to Jordan's "fast" reputation and the new freedom presented to American women, especially flappers, in the 1920s.
- Myrtle Wilson — George B. Wilson's wife and Tom Buchanan's mistress. Myrtle, who possesses a fierce vitality, is desperate to find refuge from her disappointing marriage. She is accidentally killed by Gatsby's car, as she mistakenly thinks Tom is still driving it and runs after it.
- George B. Wilson — a mechanic and owner of a garage. He is disliked by both his wife, Myrtle, and Tom Buchanan, who describes him as "so dumb he doesn't know he's alive". At the end of the novel, George shoots Gatsby dead, wrongly believing he had been driving the car that killed Myrtle, and then kills himself.

== Writing and production ==
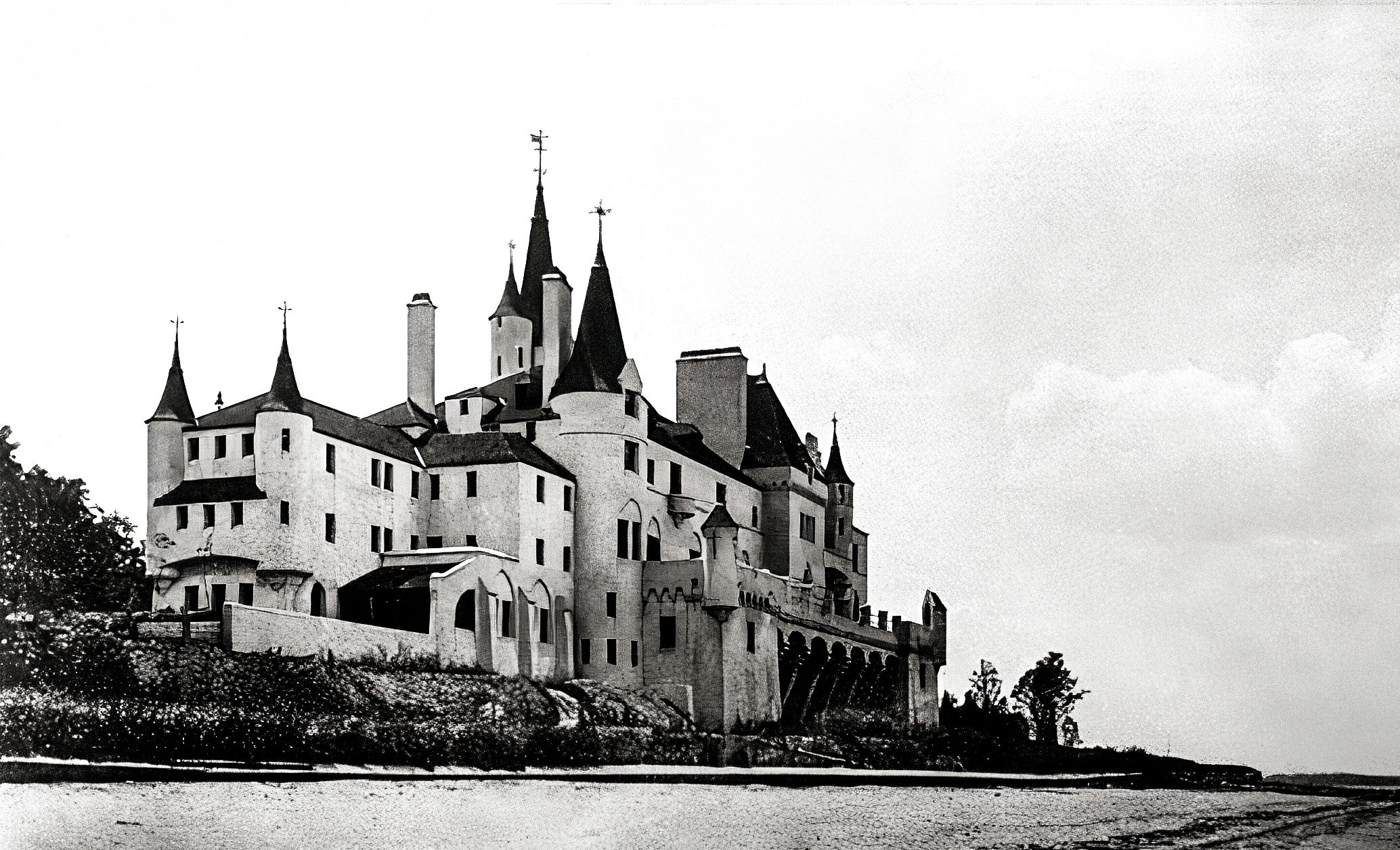
The now-demolished Beacon Towers partly served as an inspiration for Gatsby's home.

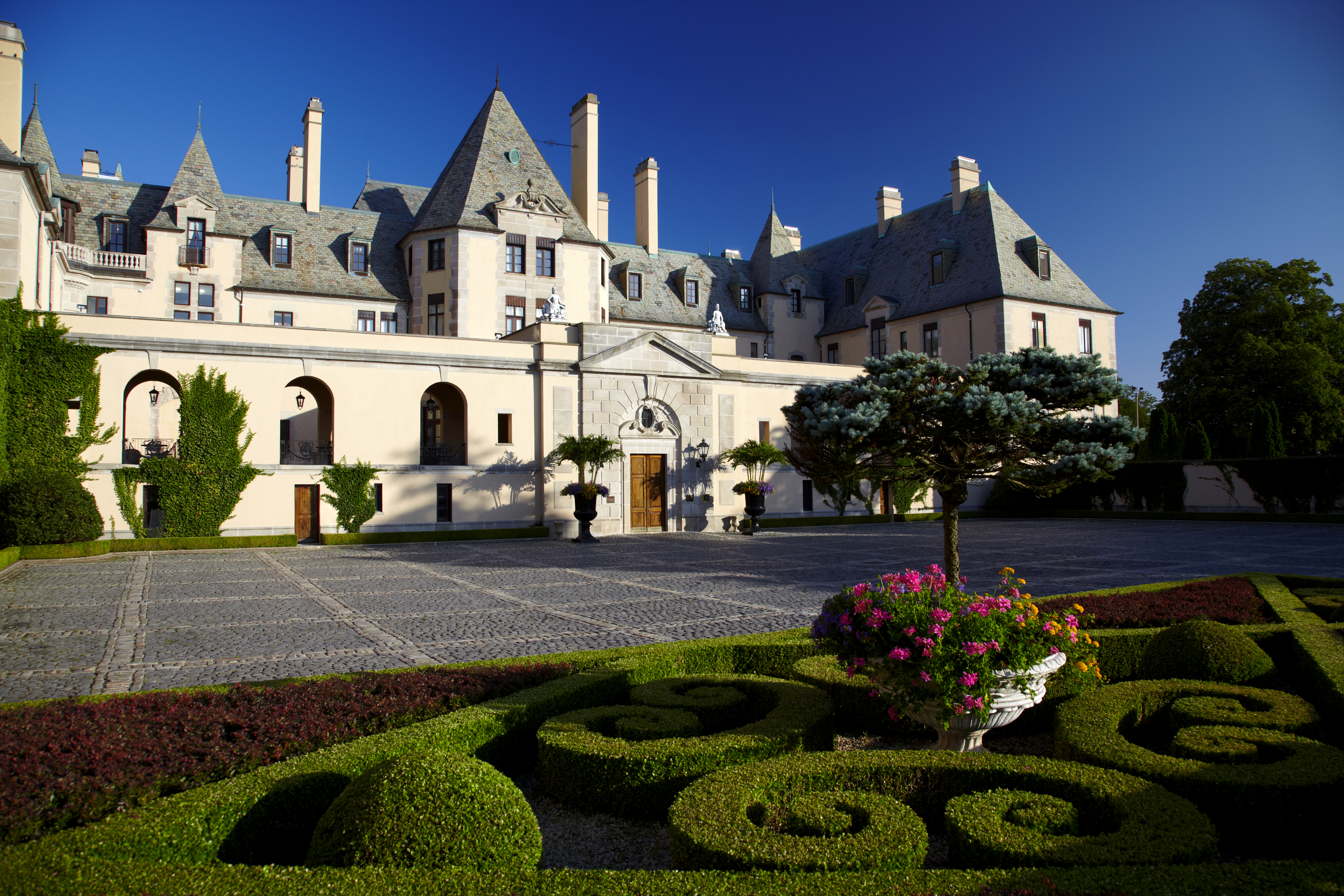
Oheka Castle was another North Shore inspiration for the novel's setting.

Fitzgerald began outlining his third novel in June 1922. He longed to produce an exquisite work that was beautiful and intricately patterned, but the troubled production of his stage play The Vegetable repeatedly interrupted his progress. The play flopped, and Fitzgerald wrote magazine stories that winter to pay debts incurred by its production. He viewed these stories as all worthless, although included among them was "Winter Dreams", which Fitzgerald described as his first attempt at the Gatsby idea. "The whole idea of Gatsby", he later explained to a friend, "is the unfairness of a poor young man not being able to marry a girl with money. This theme comes up again and again because I lived it".

In October 1922, after the birth of their only child, Frances Scott "Scottie" Fitzgerald, the Fitzgeralds moved to Great Neck, New York, on Long Island. Their neighbors in Great Neck included such newly wealthy personages as writer Ring Lardner, actor Lew Fields and comedian Ed Wynn. These figures were all considered to be nouveau riche, unlike those who came from Manhasset Neck, which sat across the bay from Great Neck—places that were home to many of New York's wealthiest established families. This real-life juxtaposition gave Fitzgerald his idea for "West Egg" and "East Egg". In the novel, Great Neck (Kings Point) became the "new money" peninsula of West Egg and Port Washington (Sands Point) became the "old money" East Egg. Several Gold Coast mansions in the area served as inspiration for Gatsby's estate including Land's End, Oheka Castle, and the since-demolished Beacon Towers.

While living on Long Island, the Fitzgeralds' enigmatic neighbor was Max Gerlach. (Note: Primary sources such as Zelda Fitzgerald and F. Scott Fitzgerald's friend Edmund Wilson both stated that Max Gerlach was a neighbor. Scholars have yet to find surviving property records for a Long Island residence with Gerlach's name. However, there are likely "gaps in the record of his addresses", and an accurate reconstruction of Gerlach's life and whereabouts is greatly hindered "by the imperfect state of relevant documentation".) Purportedly born in America to a German immigrant family, (Note: In a 2009 book, scholar Horst Kruse asserts that Max Gerlach was born in or near Berlin, Germany, and, as a young boy, he immigrated with his German parents to America.) Gerlach had been a major in the American Expeditionary Forces during World War I, and he later became a gentleman bootlegger who lived like a millionaire in New York. Flaunting his new wealth, (Note: With the end of prohibition and the onset of the Great Depression, Max Gerlach lost his wealth. Living in poverty, he attempted suicide by shooting himself in the head in 1939. The attempt blinded him. Gerlach died in 1958.) Gerlach threw lavish parties, never wore the same shirt twice, used the phrase "old sport", and fostered myths about himself, including that he was a relation of the German Kaiser. These details about Gerlach inspired Fitzgerald in his creation of Jay Gatsby. A note in the Fitzgeralds' scrapbook dated July 20, 1923, and signed by Gerlach, preserves his use of Gatsby's signature phrase: 'How are you and the family old Sport?'

During this same time period, the daily newspapers sensationalized the Hall–Mills murder case over many months, and the highly publicized case likely influenced the plot of Fitzgerald's novel. The case involved the double-murder of a man and his lover on September 14, 1922, mere weeks before Fitzgerald arrived in Great Neck. Scholars have speculated that Fitzgerald based certain aspects of the ending of The Great Gatsby and various characterizations on this factual incident.

Inspired by the Hall–Mills case, the mysterious persona of Gerlach, and the riotous parties he attended on Long Island, Fitzgerald had written 18,000 words for his novel by mid-1923, but discarded most of his new story as a false start. Some of this early draft resurfaced in the 1924 short story "Absolution". In earlier drafts, (Note: Only two pages of the first draft of The Great Gatsby survive. Fitzgerald enclosed them with a letter to Willa Cather in 1925. They are now in the Fitzgerald Papers at Princeton University.) Daisy was originally named Ada and Nick was Dud, and the two characters had shared a previous romance prior to their reunion on Long Island. These earlier drafts were written from the viewpoint of an omniscient narrator as opposed to Nick's perspective. A key difference in earlier drafts is a less complete failure of Gatsby's dream. Another difference is that the argument between Tom Buchanan and Gatsby is more balanced, although Daisy still returns to Tom.

Work on The Great Gatsby resumed in earnest in April 1924. Fitzgerald decided to depart from the writing process of his previous novels and told Perkins that he was intent on creating an artistic achievement. He wished to eschew the realism of his previous two novels and to compose a creative work of sustained imagination. To this end, he consciously imitated the literary styles of Joseph Conrad and Willa Cather. He was particularly influenced by Cather's 1923 work, A Lost Lady, which features a wealthy married socialite pursued by a variety of romantic suitors and who symbolically embodies the American dream. He later wrote a letter to Cather apologizing for any unintentional plagiarism. During this period of revisions, Scott saw and was influenced by early sketches for the book's dust jacket art. Soon after this burst of effort, work slowed while the Fitzgeralds moved to the Villa Marie in Saint-Raphaël on the French Riviera, where a marital crisis soon developed. (Note: While Fitzgerald worked on the novel, his wife Zelda was romanced by French naval aviator Edouard Jozan and asked for a divorce.)

Despite his ongoing marital tension, Fitzgerald continued to write steadily and submitted a near-final version of the manuscript to his editor, Maxwell Perkins, on October 27. Perkins informed him in a November letter that Gatsby was too vague as a character and that his wealth and business, respectively, needed a convincing explanation. Fitzgerald thanked Perkins for his detailed criticisms and claimed that such feedback would enable him to perfect the manuscript. Having relocated with his wife to Rome, Fitzgerald made revisions to the manuscript throughout the winter.

Content after a few rounds of revision, Fitzgerald submitted the final version in February 1925. Fitzgerald's alterations included extensive revisions of the sixth and eighth chapters. He declined an offer of $10,000 for the serial rights to the book so that it could be published sooner. He received a $3,939 advance in 1923 and would receive $1,981.25 upon publication.

Serialized versions of the story first appeared in 1926, with a condensed version appearing in the Altoona Tribune in February, and another appearing in The Famous Story Magazine beginning in April.

Issue of The Famous Story Magazine featuring "a vivid new novel by F. Scott Fitzgerald": the serialization of The Great Gatsby

=== Alternative titles ===
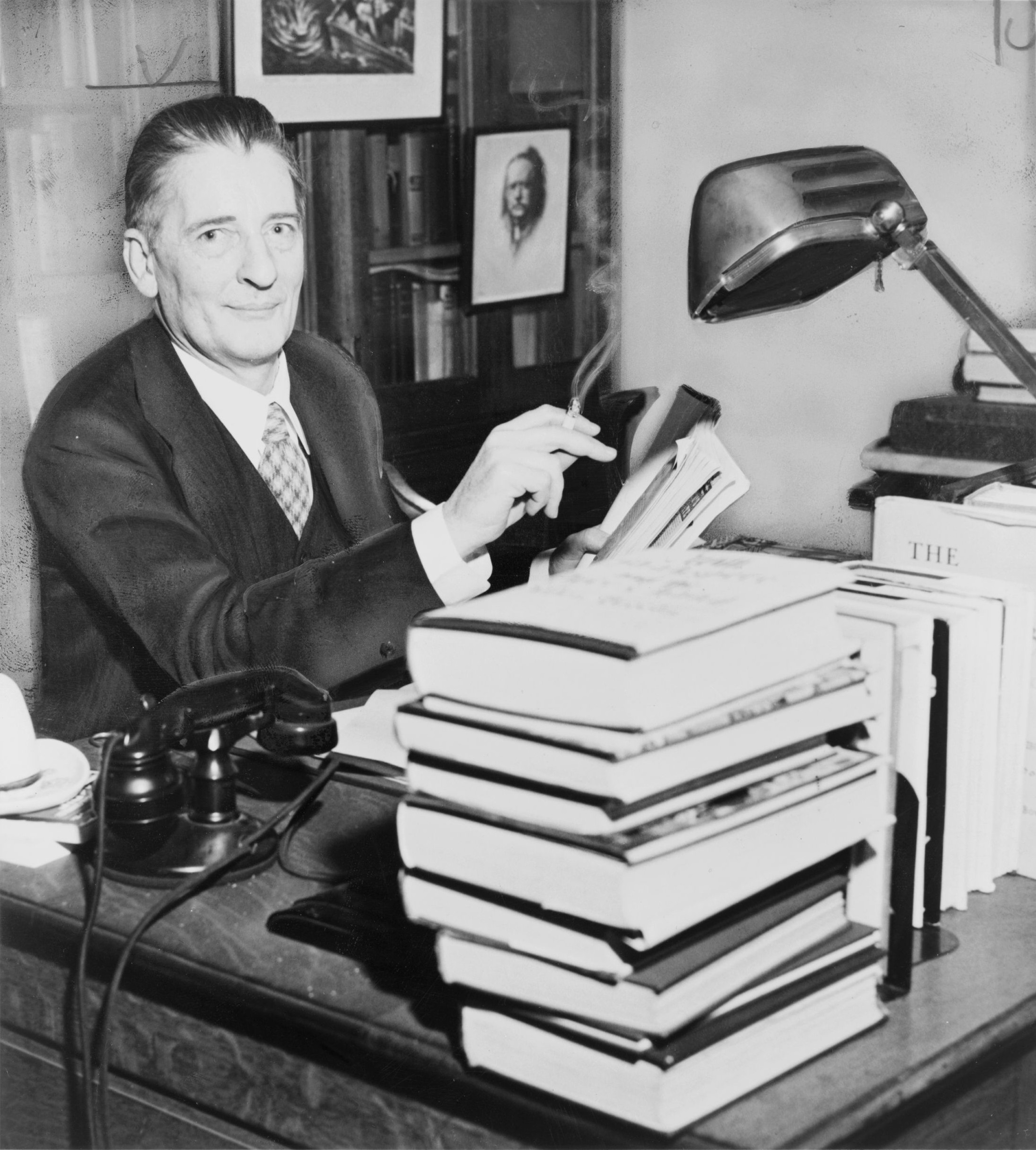
Fitzgerald's editor, Maxwell Perkins, convinced the author to abandon his original title of Trimalchio in West Egg in favor of The Great Gatsby.

Fitzgerald had difficulty choosing a title for his novel and entertained many choices before reluctantly deciding on The Great Gatsby, a title inspired by Alain-Fournier's Le Grand Meaulnes. Previously he had shifted between Among Ash Heaps and Millionaires, Trimalchio, Trimalchio in West Egg, On the Road to West Egg, Under the Red, White, and Blue, The Gold-Hatted Gatsby, and The High-Bouncing Lover. The titles The Gold-Hatted Gatsby and The High-Bouncing Lover came from Fitzgerald's epigraph for the novel, one which he wrote himself under the pen name of Thomas Parke D'Invilliers.

Fitzgerald initially preferred titles referencing Trimalchio, (Note: In 2002, over six decades after Fitzgerald's death, his earlier draft of the now-famous novel was published under the title Trimalchio: An Early Version of The Great Gatsby.) the crude upstart in Petronius's Satyricon, and even refers to Gatsby as Trimalchio once in the novel. Unlike Gatsby's spectacular parties, Trimalchio participated in the orgies he hosted but, according to literary critic Tony Tanner, there are subtle similarities between the two characters. By November 1924, Fitzgerald wrote to Perkins that he had settled upon the title of Trimalchio in West Egg.

Disliking Fitzgerald's chosen title of Trimalchio in West Egg, editor Max Perkins persuaded him that the reference was too obscure and that people would be unable to pronounce it. Zelda and Perkins both expressed their preference for The Great Gatsby, and the next month Fitzgerald agreed. A month before publication, after a final review of the proofs, he asked if it would be possible to re-title it Trimalchio or Gold-Hatted Gatsby, but Perkins advised against it. On March 19, 1925, Fitzgerald expressed enthusiasm for the title Under the Red, White, and Blue, but it was too late to change it at that stage. The novel was published as The Great Gatsby on April 10, 1925. Fitzgerald believed the book's final title to be merely acceptable and often expressed his ambivalence with the name.

=== Dust jacket art ===
Drafts of the dust jacket by artist Francis Cugat juxtaposed with the final version. In one draft (first), a single eye loomed over Long Island Sound. In a subsequent draft (second), Cugat expanded upon this concept to feature two eyes gazing over the New York cityscape. In the final draft (third), the shadowy cityscape was replaced by carnival lights evoking Coney Island.

The artwork for the first edition of The Great Gatsby, known as Celestial Eyes, is among the most celebrated in American literature and represents a unique instance in literary history in which a novel's commissioned artwork directly influenced the composition of the text. Rendered in an Art Deco visual style, the artwork depicts the disembodied face of a Jazz Age flapper with celestial eyes and rouged mouth over a dark blue skyline. A little-known Barcelonan painter named Francis Cugat—born Francisco Coradal-Cougat—was commissioned by an unknown individual in Scribner's art department to illustrate the cover while Fitzgerald was composing the novel.

In a preliminary sketch, Cugat drew a concept of a dismal gray landscape inspired by Fitzgerald's original title for the novel, Among Ash Heaps and Millionaires. Discarding this gloomy concept, Cugat next drew a divergent study which became the prefiguration to the final cover: A pencil and crayon drawing of a flapper's half-hidden visage over Long Island Sound with scarlet lips, one celestial eye, and a single diagonal tear. Expanding upon this study, his subsequent drawing featured two bright eyes looming over a shadowy New York cityscape. In later iterations, Cugat replaced the shadowy cityscape with dazzling carnival lights evoking a Ferris wheel and likely referencing the glittering amusement park at New York's Coney Island. Cugat affixed reclining nudes within the flapper's irises and added a green tint to the streaming tear. Cugat's final cover, (Note: Many years after The Great Gatsby's publication, Francis Cugat's original painting for the book cover was presumed forever lost until it was found in a trash can at Scribner's and donated to the Princeton University Libraries for its Graphic Arts Collection.) which Max Perkins hailed as a masterpiece, was the only work he completed for Scribner's and the only book cover he ever designed.

Although Fitzgerald likely never saw the final gouache painting prior to the novel's publication, Cugat's preparatory drafts influenced his writing. Upon viewing Cugat's drafts before sailing for France in April–May 1924, Fitzgerald was so enamored that he later told editor Max Perkins that he had incorporated Cugat's imagery into the novel. This statement has led many to analyze interrelations between Cugat's art and Fitzgerald's text. One popular interpretation is that the celestial eyes are reminiscent of those of optometrist T. J. Eckleburg depicted on a faded commercial billboard near George Wilson's auto repair shop. Author Ernest Hemingway supported this latter interpretation and claimed that Fitzgerald had told him the cover referred to a billboard in the valley of the ashes. Although this passage has some resemblance to the imagery, a closer explanation can be found in Fitzgerald's explicit description of Daisy Buchanan as the "girl whose disembodied face floated along the dark cornices and blinding signs".

== Critical reception ==
=== Initial reviews ===
Charles Scribner's Sons published The Great Gatsby on April 10, 1925. Fitzgerald cabled Perkins the day after publication to monitor reviews: "Any news?" "Sales situation doubtful [but] excellent reviews", read a telegram from Perkins on April 20. Fitzgerald responded on April 24, saying the cable dispirited him, closing the letter with "Yours in great depression". Fitzgerald soon received letters from contemporaries Willa Cather, Edith Wharton, and poet T. S. Eliot praising the novel. Although gratified by such correspondence, Fitzgerald sought public acclaim from professional critics.

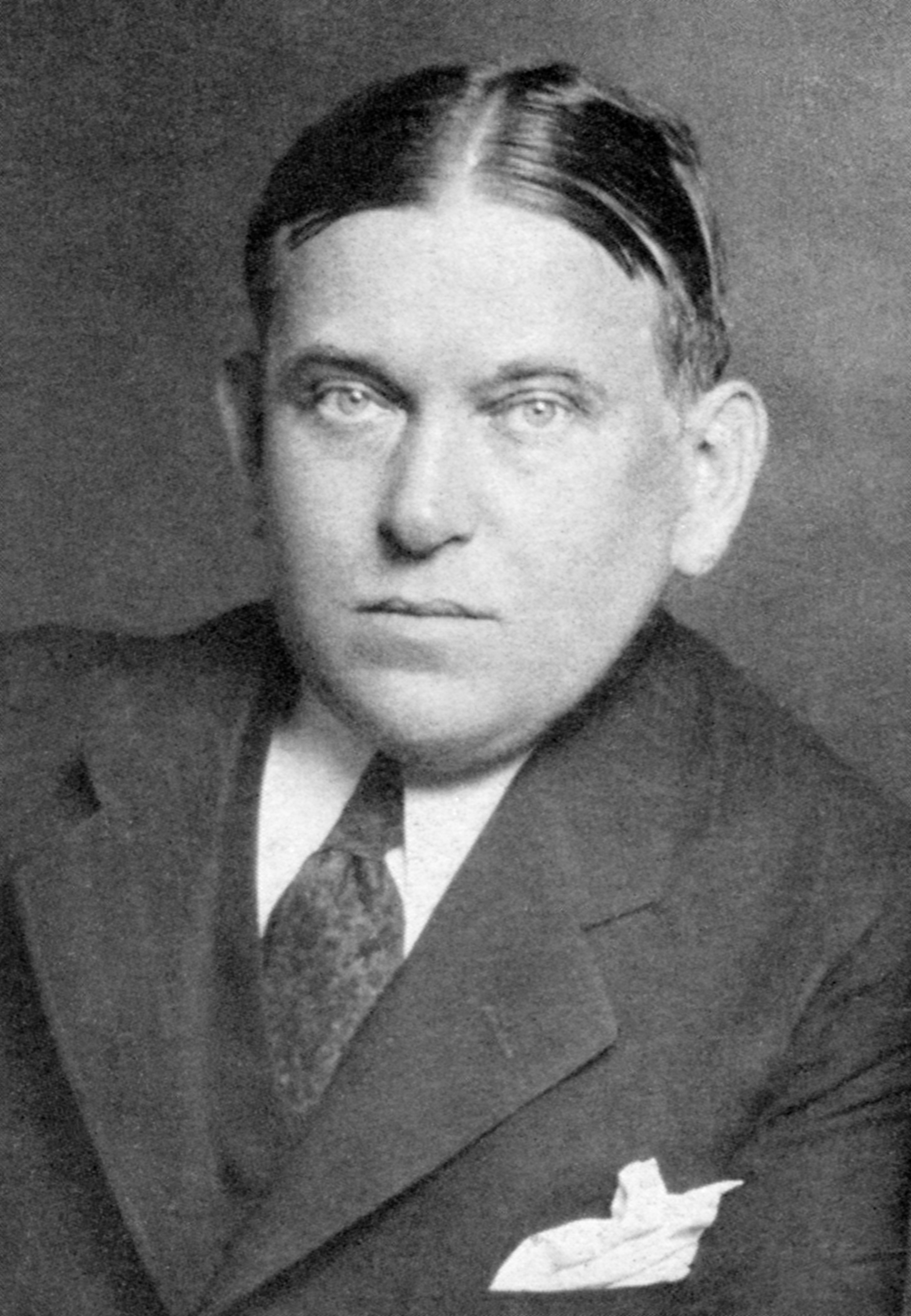
Although he praised the novel's style, H. L. Mencken criticized the plot as highly improbable—a criticism that Fitzgerald particularly resented.

The Great Gatsby received generally favorable reviews from literary critics of the day. Edwin Clark of The New York Times felt the novel was a mystical and glamorous tale of the Jazz Age. Similarly, Lillian C. Ford of the Los Angeles Times hailed the novel as a revelatory work of art that "leaves the reader in a mood of chastened wonder". The New York Post described Fitzgerald's prose style as scintillating and genuinely brilliant. The New York Herald Tribune was less impressed, referring to The Great Gatsby as "a literary lemon meringue" that nonetheless "contains some of the nicest little touches of contemporary observation you could imagine—so light, so delicate, so sharp". In The Chicago Daily Tribune, H. L. Mencken judged the work's plot to be highly improbable, although he praised the writing as elegant and the "careful and brilliant finish".

Several reviewers felt the novel left much to be desired following Fitzgerald's previous works and criticized him accordingly. Harvey Eagleton of The Dallas Morning News predicted that the novel signaled the end of Fitzgerald's artistic success. Ralph Coghlan of the St. Louis Post-Dispatch dismissed the work as an inconsequential performance by a once-promising author who had grown bored and cynical. Ruth Snyder of New York Evening World lambasted the book's style as painfully forced and declared the editors of her newspaper were "quite convinced after reading The Great Gatsby that Mr. Fitzgerald is not one of the great American writers of today". John McClure of The Times-Picayune insisted the plot was implausible and the book itself seemed raw in its construction.

After reading these reviews, Fitzgerald believed that many critics misunderstood the novel. He despaired that "of all the reviews, even the most enthusiastic, not one had the slightest idea what the book was about". In particular, Fitzgerald resented criticisms of the novel's plot as implausible since he had never intended for the story to be realistic. Instead, he crafted the work to be a romanticized depiction that was largely scenic and symbolic. According to his friend John Peale Bishop, Fitzgerald further resented the fact that critics failed to perceive the many parallels between the author's life and the character of Jay Gatsby; in particular, that both created a mythical version of themselves and attempted to live up to this legend. Dispirited by critics failing to understand the novel, Fitzgerald remained hopeful that the novel would at least be a commercial success, perhaps selling as many as 75,000 copies.

To Fitzgerald's great disappointment, Gatsby was a commercial failure in comparison with his previous efforts, This Side of Paradise (1920) and The Beautiful and Damned (1922). By October, the book had sold fewer than 20,000 copies. Although the novel went through two initial printings, many copies remained unsold years later. Fitzgerald attributed the poor sales to the fact that women tended to be the primary audience for novels during this time, and Gatsby did not contain an admirable female character. According to his ledger, he earned only $2,000 from the book. Although Owen Davis' 1926 stage adaptation and the Paramount-issued silent film version brought in money for the author, Fitzgerald lamented that the novel fell far short of the success he had hoped for and would not bring him recognition as a serious novelist in the public eye. With the onset of the Great Depression, The Great Gatsby was regarded as little more than a nostalgic period piece. By the time Fitzgerald died in 1940, the novel had fallen into near obscurity.

=== Revival and reassessment ===
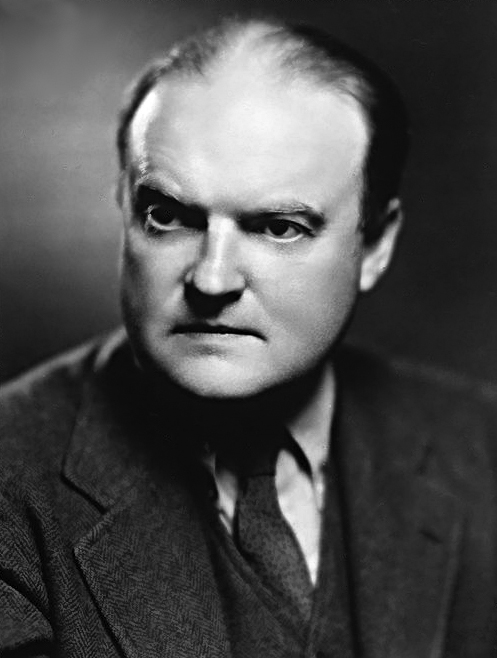
Fitzgerald's friend Edmund Wilson helped revive the author's posthumous reputation.

In 1940, Fitzgerald suffered a third and fatal heart attack and died believing his work forgotten. His obituary in The New York Times hailed him as a brilliant novelist and cited Gatsby as his greatest work. In the wake of Fitzgerald's death, a strong appreciation for the book gradually developed in writers' circles. Future authors Budd Schulberg and Edward Newhouse were deeply affected by it, and John O'Hara acknowledged its influence on his work. By the time that Gatsby was republished in Edmund Wilson's edition of The Last Tycoon in 1941, the prevailing opinion in writers' circles deemed the novel to be an enduring work of fiction.

In the spring of 1942, mere months after the United States' entrance into World War II, an association of publishing executives created the Council on Books in Wartime with the stated purpose of distributing paperback Armed Services Editions books to combat troops. The Great Gatsby was one of them. Within the next several years, 155,000 copies of Gatsby were distributed to U.S. soldiers overseas, and the book proved popular among beleaguered troops, according to the Saturday Evening Post's 1945 report.

By 1944, a full-scale Fitzgerald revival had occurred. Full-length scholarly articles on Fitzgerald's works were being published in periodicals and, by the following year, the earlier consensus among professional critics that The Great Gatsby was merely a sensational story or a nostalgic period piece had effectively vanished. The tireless promotional efforts of literary critic Edmund Wilson, who was Fitzgerald's Princeton classmate and his close friend, led this Fitzgerald revival. In 1951, three years after Zelda's death in a hospital fire, Professor Arthur Mizener of Cornell University published The Far Side of Paradise, the first biography of Fitzgerald. Mizener's bestselling biography emphasized The Great Gatsby's positive reception by literary critics, which may have further influenced public opinion and renewed interest in it.

By 1960—thirty-five years after the novel's original publication—the book was steadily selling 100,000 copies per year. Renewed interest in it led The New York Times editorialist Mizener to proclaim the novel was a masterwork of 20th-century American literature. By 1974, The Great Gatsby had attained its status as a literary masterwork and was deemed a contender for the title of the "Great American Novel".

By the mid-2000s, many literary critics considered The Great Gatsby to be one of the greatest novels ever written, and the work was part of the assigned curricula in the near majority of U.S. high schools. As of early 2020, The Great Gatsby had sold almost 30 million copies worldwide and continues to sell an additional 500,000 copies annually. Numerous foreign editions of the novel have been published, and the text has been translated into 42 different languages. The work is Scribner's most popular title; in 2013, the e-book alone sold 185,000 copies. The American Library Association lists the book as among the most challenged classics in U.S. literature. The novel's U.S. copyright expired on January 1, 2021, when it, along with all the other literature of 1925, entered the public domain. Since then, numerous altered and incomplete reprints have flooded the market.

== Critical analysis ==
=== Major themes ===
==== The American Dream ====
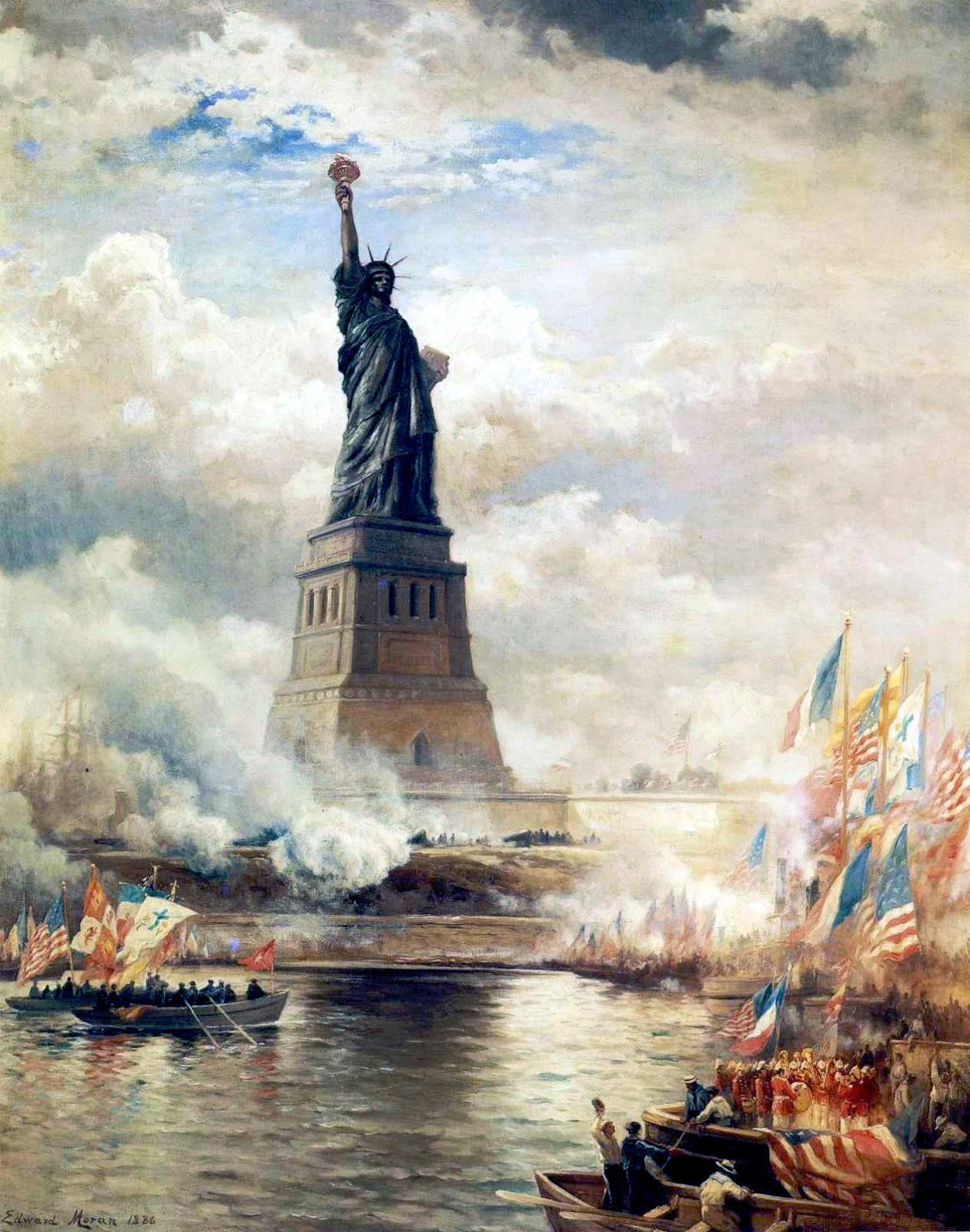
The American Dream, often represented by the Statue of Liberty signifying new opportunities in life, is a central theme underlying the novel.

Following the novel's revival, later critical writings on The Great Gatsby focused on Fitzgerald's disillusionment with the American Dream in the hedonistic Jazz Age, a name for the era which Fitzgerald claimed to have coined. In 1970, scholar Roger L. Pearson asserted that Fitzgerald's work—more so than other twentieth century novels—is especially linked with this conceptualization of the American dream. Pearson traced the literary origins of this dream to Colonial America. The dream is the belief that every individual, regardless of their origins, may seek and achieve their desired goals, "be they political, monetary, or social. It is the literary expression of the concept of America: The land of opportunity".

However, Pearson noted that Fitzgerald's particular treatment of this theme is devoid of the discernible optimism in the writings of earlier American authors. He suggests Gatsby serves as a false prophet of the American dream, and pursuing the dream only results in dissatisfaction for those who chase it, owing to its unattainability. In this analytical context, the green light on the Buchanans' dock (visible across Long Island Sound from Gatsby's house) is frequently interpreted as a symbol of Gatsby's unrealizable goal to win Daisy and, consequently, to achieve the American Dream. Also, scholar Sarah Churchwell points out that adultery in the novel is linked to the loss of faith and broken promises, which symbolizes the corruption of the American Dream.

==== Class permanence ====
Scholars and writers commonly ascribe Gatsby's inability to achieve the American Dream to entrenched class disparities in American society. The novel underscores the limits of the American lower class to transcend their station of birth. Scholar Sarah Churchwell contends that Fitzgerald's novel is a tale of class warfare in a status-obsessed country that refuses to acknowledge publicly it even has a class system.

Although scholars posit different explanations for the continuation of class differences in the United States, there is a consensus regarding the novel's message in conveying its underlying permanence. Although Gatsby's fundamental conflict occurs between entrenched sources of socio-economic power and upstarts like Gatsby who threaten their interests, Fitzgerald's novel shows that a class permanence persists despite the country's capitalist economy that prizes innovation and adaptability. Dianne Bechtel argues Fitzgerald plotted the novel to illustrate that class transcends wealth in America. Even if the poorer Americans become rich, they remain inferior to those Americans with "old money". Consequently, Gatsby and other characters in the novel are trapped in a rigid American class system.

==== Gender relations ====
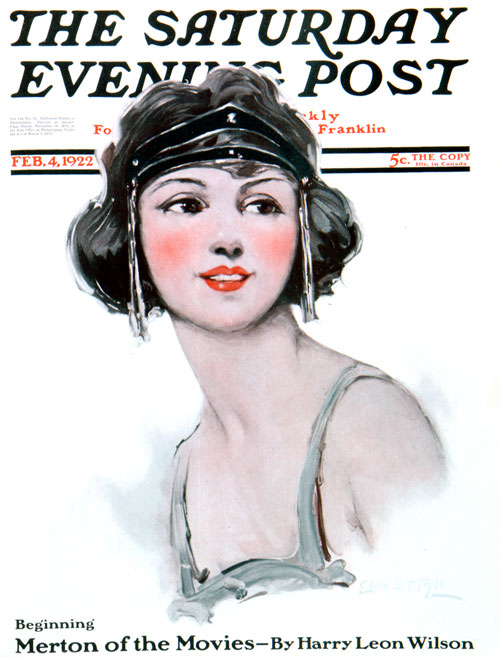
An idealized depiction of a flapper as illustrated by Ellen Pyle for the cover of The Saturday Evening Post (1922)

Besides exploring the difficulties of achieving the American dream, The Great Gatsby explores societal gender expectations during the Jazz Age. The character of Daisy Buchanan has been identified specifically as personifying the emerging cultural archetype of the flapper. Flappers were typically young, modern women who bobbed their hair and wore short skirts. They also drank alcohol and had premarital sex.

Despite the newfound societal freedoms attained by flappers in the 1920s, Fitzgerald's work critically examines the continued limitations upon women's agency during this period. In this context, although early critics viewed the character of Daisy to be a "monster of bitchery", later scholars such as Leland S. Person Jr. asserted that Daisy's character exemplifies the marginalization of women in the elite social environment that Fitzgerald depicts.

Writing in 1978, Person noted Daisy is more of a hapless victim than a manipulative victimizer. She is the target first of Tom's callous domination and next of Gatsby's dehumanizing adoration. She involuntarily becomes the holy grail at the center of Gatsby's unrealistic quest to be steadfast to a youthful concept of himself. The ensuing contest of wills between Tom and Gatsby reduces Daisy to a trophy wife whose sole existence is to augment her possessor's socio-economic success.

As an upper-class white woman living in East Egg during this time period, Daisy must adhere to societal expectations and gender norms such as actively fulfilling the roles of dutiful wife, nurturing mother, and charming socialite. Many of Daisy's choices—ultimately culminating in the fatal car crash and misery for all those involved—can be partly attributed to her prescribed role as a "beautiful little fool" who is reliant on her husband for financial and societal security. (Note: Daisy's statement that she hopes her daughter will be a "beautiful little fool" was said by Zelda Fitzgerald when their daughter Scottie was born on October 26, 1921, in a St. Paul hospital.) Her decision to remain with her husband, despite her feelings for Gatsby, is because of the security that her marriage to Tom Buchanan provides.

==== Race and displacement ====
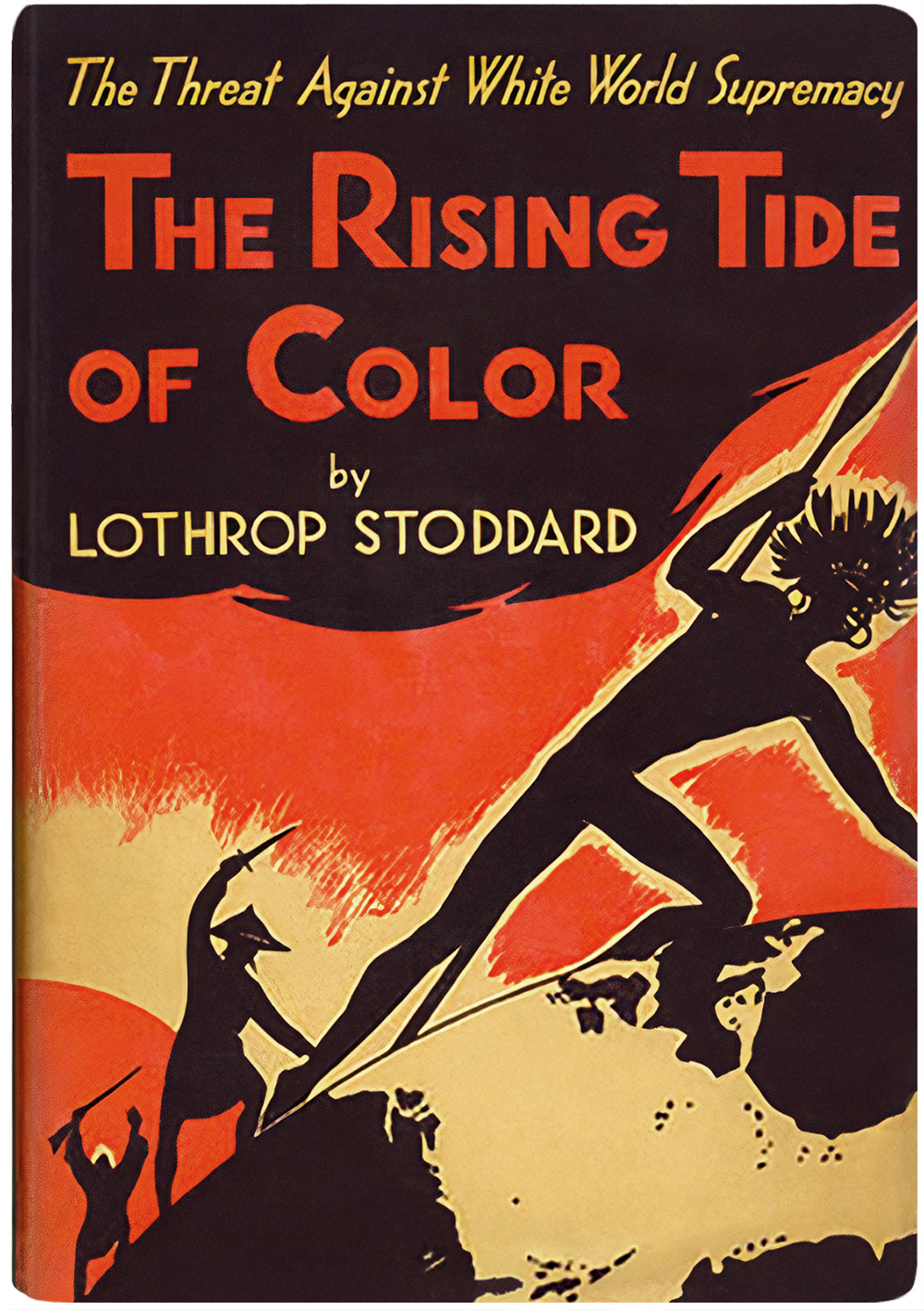
Fitzgerald's novel references a fictional book, Goddard's The Rise of the Colored Empires, which is a parody of The Rising Tide of Color (1920) by Lothrop Stoddard.

Many scholars have analyzed the novel's treatment of race and displacement; in particular, a perceived threat posed by newer immigrants to older Americans, triggering concerns over a loss of socio-economic status. In one instance, Tom Buchanan—the novel's antagonist—claims that he, Nick, and Jordan are racially superior Nordics. Tom decries immigration and advocates white supremacy. A fictional book alluded to by Tom is Goddard's The Rise of the Colored Empires, which is a parody by Fitzgerald of Lothrop Stoddard's The Rising Tide of Color, a 1920s bestseller. Stoddard warned that immigration would alter America's racial composition and destroy the country.

Analyzing these elements, literary theorist Walter Benn Michaels contends that Fitzgerald's novel reflects a historical period in American literature characterized by fears over the influx of Southern and Eastern European immigrants whose "otherness" challenged Americans' sense of national identity. Such anxieties were more salient in national discourse than the societal consequences of World War I, and the defining question of the period was who constituted "a real American".

In this context of immigration and displacement, Tom's hostility towards Gatsby, who is the embodiment of "latest America", has been interpreted as partly embodying status anxieties of the time involving anti-immigrant sentiment. Gatsby—whom Tom belittles as "Mr. Nobody from Nowhere"—functions as a cipher because of his obscure origins, his unclear ethno-religious identity and his indeterminate class status. Although his ethnicity is vague, his last name Gatz and his father's adherence to the Lutheran religion indicate his family are recent German immigrants. This would preclude them from the coveted status of Old Stock Americans. Consequently, Gatsby's socio-economic ascent is deemed a threat not only due to his status as nouveau riche, but because he is perceived as an outsider.

Because of such themes, The Great Gatsby captures the perennial American experience as it is a story about change and those who resist it—whether such change comes in the form of a new wave of immigrants, the nouveau riche, or successful minorities. Since Americans living in the 1920s to the present are largely defined by their fluctuating socio-economic circumstances and must navigate a society with entrenched racial and ethnic prejudices, Fitzgerald's depiction of resultant status anxieties and social conflict has been highlighted by scholars as still enduringly relevant nearly a hundred years after the novel's publication.

==== Sexuality and identity ====
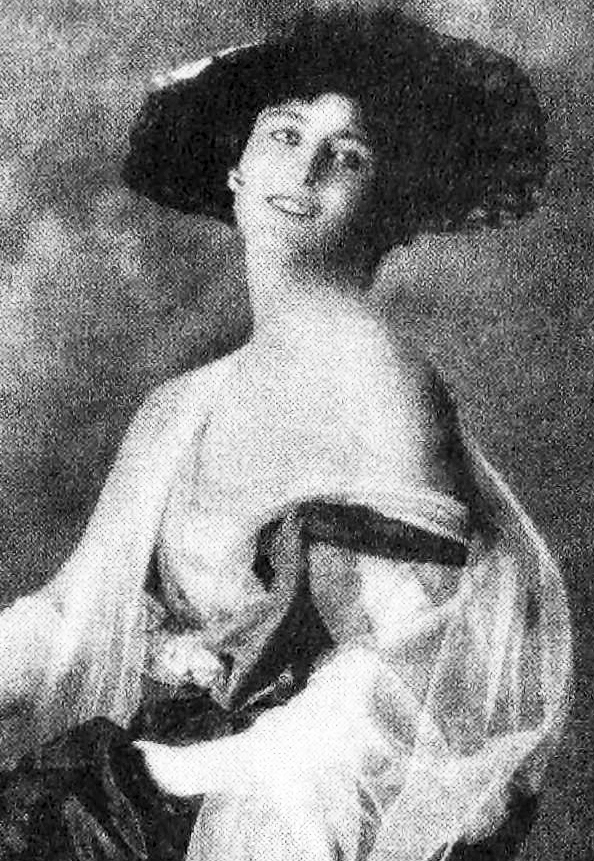
A photo of Fitzgerald dressed as a woman circa 1915

Questions regarding the sexuality of characters have been raised for decades and—augmented by biographical details about the author—have given rise to queer readings. During his lifetime, Fitzgerald's sexuality became a subject of debate among his friends and acquaintances. As a youth, Fitzgerald had a close relationship with Father Sigourney Fay, a possibly gay Catholic priest, and Fitzgerald later used his last name for the idealized romantic character of Daisy Fay. After college, Fitzgerald cross-dressed during outings in Minnesota. Years later, while drafting The Great Gatsby, rumors dogged Fitzgerald among the American expat community in Paris that he was gay. Soon after, Fitzgerald's wife Zelda Fitzgerald likewise doubted his heterosexuality and asserted that he was a closeted homosexual. She publicly belittled him with homophobic slurs, and she alleged that Fitzgerald and fellow writer Ernest Hemingway engaged in homosexual relations. These incidents strained the Fitzgeralds' marriage at the time of the novel's publication.

Although Fitzgerald's sexuality is a subject of scholarly debate, (Note: Fessenden (2005) argues that Fitzgerald struggled with his sexual orientation. In contrast, Bruccoli (2002) insists that "anyone can be called a latent homosexual, but there is no evidence that Fitzgerald was ever involved in a homosexual attachment".) such biographical details lent credence to critical interpretations that his fictional characters are either gay or bisexual surrogates. (Note: Scholars have focused on Fitzgerald's statement in a letter that his mind was "half feminine". In 1935, Fitzgerald wrote to Laura Guthrie: "I don't know what it is in me or that comes to me when I start to write. I am half feminine—at least my mind is".) As early as 1945, critics such as Lionel Trilling noted that characters in The Great Gatsby, such as Jordan Baker, were implied to be "vaguely homosexual", and, in 1960, writer Otto Friedrich commented upon the ease of examining the thwarted relations depicted in Fitzgerald's fiction through a queer lens. In recent decades, scholarship has focused sharply on the sexuality of Nick Carraway. In one instance in the novel, Carraway departs a drunken orgy with a "pale, feminine" man named Mr. McKee and—following suggestive ellipses—Nick next finds himself standing beside a bed while McKee sits between the sheets clad only in his underwear. Such scenes have led scholars to describe Nick as possessing an overt queerness and prompted analyses about his emotional attachment to Jay Gatsby. For these reasons, the novel has been described as an exploration of sexual identity during a historical era typified by the societal transition towards modernity.

==== Technology and environment ====
Technological and environmental criticisms of Gatsby seek to place the novel and its characters in a broader historical context. In 1964, Leo Marx argued in The Machine in the Garden that Fitzgerald's work evinces a tension between a complex pastoral ideal of a bygone America and the societal transformations caused by industrialization and machine technology. Specifically, the valley of the ashes, in between West Egg and New York, represents a man-made wasteland which is a byproduct of the industrialization that has made Gatsby's booming lifestyle, including his automobile, possible. Marx argues that Fitzgerald, via Nick, expresses a pastoral longing typical of other 1920s American writers like William Faulkner and Ernest Hemingway. Although such writers cherish the pastoral ideal, they accept that technological progress has deprived this ideal of nearly all meaning. In this context, Nick's repudiation of the eastern United States represents a futile attempt to withdraw into nature. Yet, as Fitzgerald's work shows, any technological demarcation between the eastern and the western United States has vanished, and one cannot escape into a pastoral past.

In 2018, scholar Kyle Keeler argued that the voracious pursuit of wealth as criticized in Fitzgerald's novel offers a warning about the perils of environmental destruction in pursuit of self-interest. According to Kyle Keeler, Gatsby's quest for greater status manifests as self-centered, anthropocentric resource acquisition. Inspired by the predatory mining practices of his fictional mentor Dan Cody, Gatsby participates in extensive deforestation amid World War I and then undertakes bootlegging activities reliant upon exploiting South American agriculture. Gatsby conveniently ignores the wasteful devastation of the valley of ashes to pursue a consumerist lifestyle and exacerbates the wealth gap that became increasingly salient in 1920s America. For these reasons, Keeler argues that—while Gatsby's socioeconomic ascent and self-transformation depend upon these very factors—each one is nonetheless partially responsible for the ongoing ecological crisis.

==== Time ====
Scholars have identified time as one of the novel's central preoccupations. Biographer Matthew J. Bruccoli states that the theme of the novel "can be expressed as Gatsby's struggle against time" and that Fitzgerald, who referred to the "hauntedness" in The Great Gatsby, "was haunted by lost time and borrowed time". From the novel's opening words ("In my younger and more vulnerable years") to its closing line ("borne back ceaselessly into the past"), the text contains at least 450 words related to time; excluding character names, "time" is the second most frequent noun in the novel, with 87 appearances. Bruccoli traces the time imagery threaded through the narrative: the Buchanans' lawn "jumping over sun-dials" in the novel's first striking image, the list of Gatsby's guests that Nick records on a time-table, and the reunion scene in which Gatsby almost knocks the defunct clock off the mantel. Time, he notes, is a concern in all of Fitzgerald's best writing, and Malcolm Cowley observed that Fitzgerald's work reads as though it was written in a room full of clocks and calendars.

=== Antisemitism ===
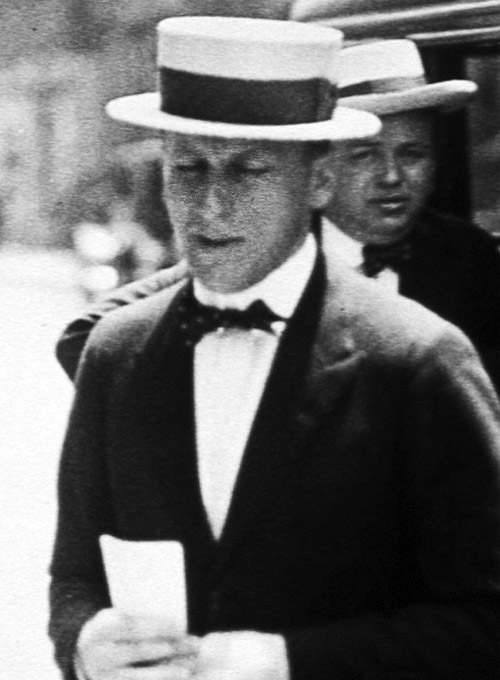
Fitzgerald based the character of Meyer Wolfsheim on Jazz Age racketeer Arnold Rothstein (pictured above) who was murdered in 1928.

The Great Gatsby has been accused of antisemitism because of its use of stereotypes of Jews. One of the novel's supporting characters is Meyer Wolfsheim, (Note: The spelling "Wolfshiem" appears throughout Fitzgerald's original manuscript, while "Wolfsheim" was introduced by editor Edmund Wilson in the second edition. This appears in later Scribner's editions.) a Jewish friend and mentor of Gatsby. A corrupt profiteer who assists Gatsby's bootlegging operations and who fixed the 1919 World Series, he appears only twice in the novel, the second time refusing to attend Gatsby's funeral. Fitzgerald describes Wolfsheim as "a small, flat-nosed Jew", with "tiny eyes" and "two fine growths of hair" in his nostrils. Evoking ethnic stereotypes regarding the Jewish nose, he describes Wolfsheim's nose as "expressive", "tragic", and able to "flash ... indignantly". The fictional character of Wolfsheim is an allusion to real-life Jewish gambler Arnold Rothstein, a notorious New York crime kingpin whom Fitzgerald met once in undetermined circumstances. Rothstein was blamed for match fixing in the Black Sox Scandal that tainted the 1919 World Series.

Wolfsheim has been interpreted as representing the Jewish miser stereotype. Richard Levy, author of Antisemitism: A Historical Encyclopedia of Prejudice and Persecution, claims that Wolfsheim serves to link Jewishness with corruption. In a 1947 article for Commentary, Milton Hindus, an assistant professor of humanities at the University of Chicago, stated that while he believed the book was a superb literary achievement, Wolfsheim was its most abrasive character, and the work contains an antisemitic undertone. Hindus argued the Jewish stereotypes displayed by Wolfsheim were typical of the time when the novel was written and set and that its antisemitism was of the "habitual, customary, 'harmless,' unpolitical variety". A 2015 article by essayist Arthur Krystal agreed with Hindus' assessment that Fitzgerald's use of Jewish caricatures was not driven by malice and merely reflected commonly held beliefs of his time. He notes the accounts of Frances Kroll, a Jewish woman and secretary to Fitzgerald, who claimed that Fitzgerald was hurt by accusations of antisemitism and responded to critiques of Wolfsheim by claiming he merely "fulfilled a function in the story and had nothing to do with race or religion".

== Adaptations ==
=== Plays ===
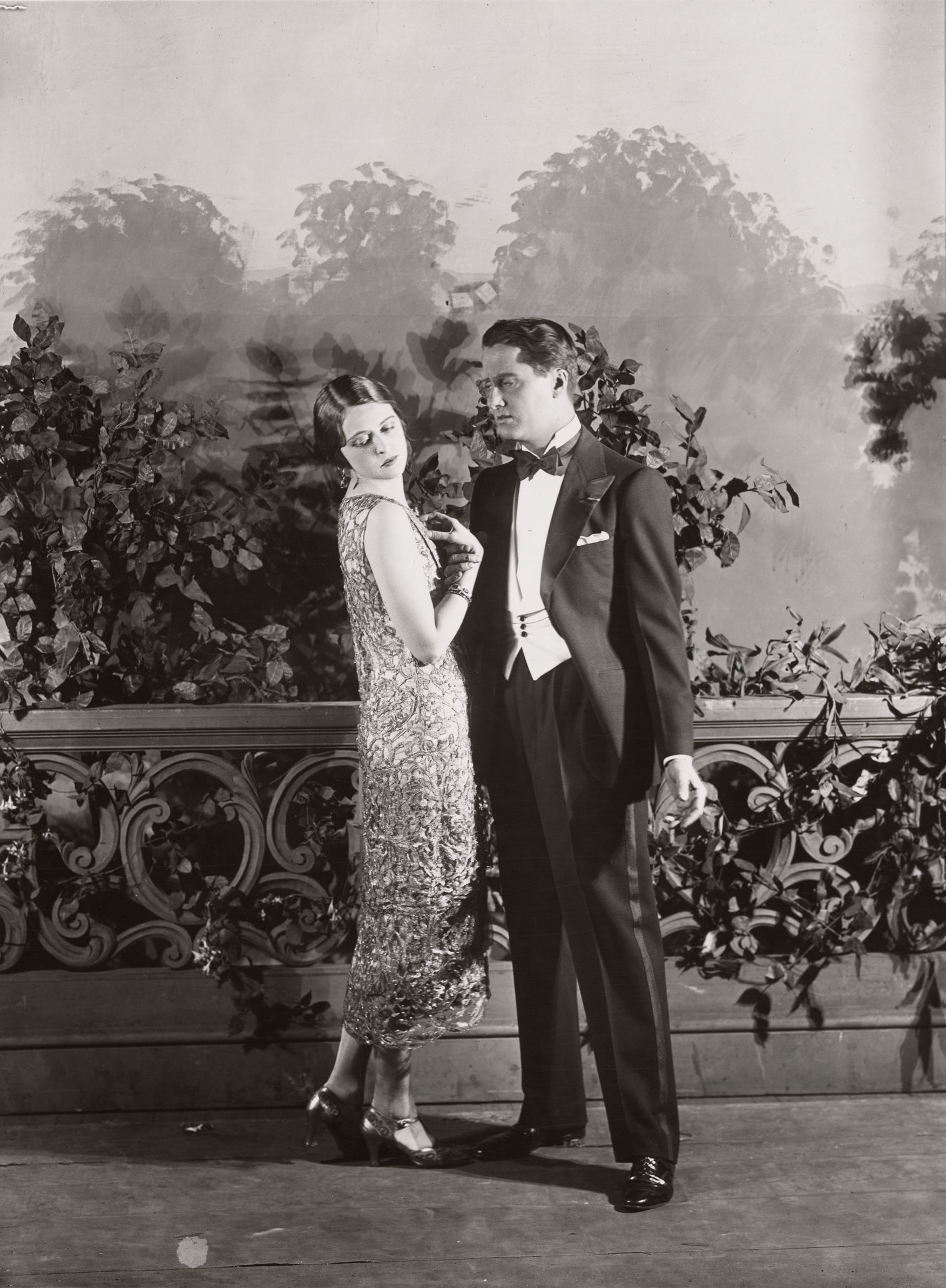
Florence Eldridge as Daisy and James Rennie as Gatsby in the first stage adaptation of The Great Gatsby, 1926

The first stage adaptation was produced by William Brady, a veteran theatrical impresario and promoter of prize fights, who acquired the rights only a few days after first reading the novel in early 1925. The script was written by the American dramatist Owen Davis, who had won a Pulitzer Prize in 1923 for his play, Icebound. Davis dramatically altered the structure of the novel, rearranging the action in chronological order, eliminating prominent elements such as the valley of ashes and the scene in the Plaza Hotel, and inventing minor characters.

The play, directed by George Cukor and starring James Rennie as Gatsby and Florence Eldridge as Daisy, opened at the Ambassador Theatre on Broadway on February 2, 1926. It was well received by critics and the public, and the run was extended past the originally scheduled closing date, finally ending on May 22, after 112 performances. The production, with some changes in the cast, then moved to Chicago, where it opened on August 1. Its popularity again led to an extension of the run, which came to an end in late September. A brief one-week return engagement at New York's Shubert Theater began on October 4, after which a road production traveled to several other cities, including Baltimore, Philadelphia, Detroit, St. Louis, Denver, and Minneapolis.

In July 2006, a stage adaptation written by Simon Levy and directed by David Esbjornson premiered at the Guthrie Theater in Minneapolis to celebrate the opening of its new building. In 2010, critic Ben Brantley of The New York Times highly praised the debut of Gatz, an Off-Broadway staging of the novel's full text by Elevator Repair Service. The New York Metropolitan Opera commissioned John Harbison to compose an operatic treatment of the novel to commemorate the 25th anniversary of James Levine's debut. The work, called The Great Gatsby, premiered on December 20, 1999.

The novel has also been adapted for ballet performances. In 2009, BalletMet premiered a version at the Capitol Theatre in Columbus, Ohio. In 2010, The Washington Ballet premiered a version at the Kennedy Center. The show received an encore run the following year.

=== Film ===
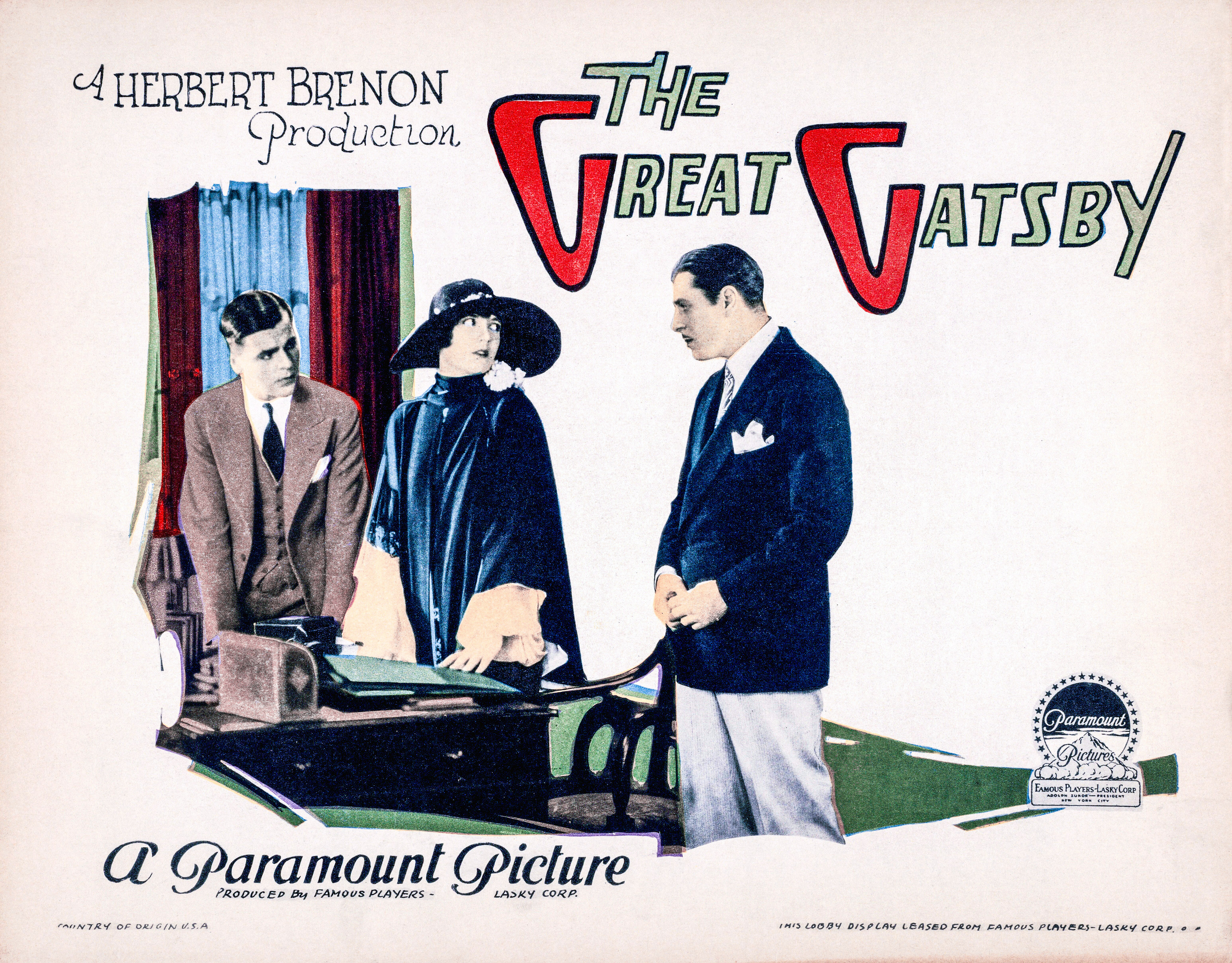
A lobby card for the lost 1926 film adaptation

The 1926 film trailer—the only extant footage

The first film version of the novel appeared in 1926. A version of Owen Davis's Broadway play of the same year, it was directed by Herbert Brenon and starred Warner Baxter, Lois Wilson and William Powell. It is a famous example of a lost film. Reviews suggest it may have been the most faithful adaptation of the novel, but a trailer of the film at the National Archives is all that is known to exist. Reportedly, Fitzgerald and his wife Zelda loathed the silent version. Zelda wrote to an acquaintance that the film was "rotten". She and Fitzgerald left the cinema midway through the film.

Following the 1926 film was 1949's The Great Gatsby, directed by Elliott Nugent and starring Alan Ladd, Betty Field and Macdonald Carey. Twenty-five years later in 1974, The Great Gatsby appeared onscreen again. It was directed by Jack Clayton and starred Robert Redford as Gatsby, Mia Farrow as Daisy, and Sam Waterston as Nick Carraway. Most recently, The Great Gatsby was directed by Baz Luhrmann in 2013 and starred Leonardo DiCaprio as Gatsby, Carey Mulligan as Daisy, and Tobey Maguire as Nick.

In 2021, visual effects company DNEG Animation announced they would be producing an animated film adaptation of the novel directed by William Joyce and written by Brian Selznick.

=== Television ===
Gatsby has been retold as a short-form television movie multiple times. The first was in 1955 as an NBC episode for Robert Montgomery Presents starring Robert Montgomery, Phyllis Kirk, and Lee Bowman. The episode was directed by Alvin Sapinsley. In 1958, CBS filmed another adaptation as an episode of Playhouse 90, also titled The Great Gatsby, which was directed by Franklin J. Schaffner and starred Robert Ryan, Jeanne Crain and Rod Taylor. Most recently, the novel was adapted as an A&E movie in 2000. The Great Gatsby was directed by Robert Markowitz and starred Toby Stephens as Gatsby, Mira Sorvino as Daisy, and Paul Rudd as Nick.

=== Musicals ===
The Yale Dramatic Association performed the first musical production of The Great Gatsby in Summer 1956. For the production, Aubrey L. Goodman adapted Fitzgerald's novel and wrote the lyrics for 14 songs by composer Robert E. Morgan. The show was performed in the University Theatre at Yale University to sold-out performances. After the Yale production, a number of musical adaptations followed.

A second musical adaptation debuted in Spring 1998, undertaken by Stage One, with Colin Stevens as Gatsby and Ann Marcuson as Jordan Baker. Directed by Phil Smith with an original score by Thomas Johnson, this jazz adaptation premiered at the Pavilion Theatre in Rhyl, Wales. As a jazz adaptation, Johnson's original score emphasized saxophone and brass sextet instruments.

In 2023, the third musical adaptation, with music and lyrics by Jason Howland and Nathan Tysen and a book by Kait Kerrigan began a one-month limited engagement at the Paper Mill Playhouse. The Broadway tryout began its previews on October 12, 2023, followed by an official opening night scheduled for ten days later. The production concluded on November 12 of the same year. Jeremy Jordan and Eva Noblezada starred as the leading roles of Jay Gatsby and Daisy Buchanan, with Samantha Pauly and Noah J. Ricketts as Jordan Baker and Nick Carraway. The production transferred to Broadway for previews on March 29, 2024, and opened officially on April 25, 2024.

In Spring 2024, Gatsby: An American Myth, a fourth musical adaptation with music and lyrics by Florence Welch and Thomas Bartlett and a book by Martyna Majok premiered at the American Repertory Theater. The production starred Isaac Cole Powell as Jay Gatsby and Ben Levi Ross as Nick Carraway. On May 25, 2024, the show began previews and opened officially on June 5 of the same year. It closed on August 3, 2024.

=== Literature ===
Since entering the public domain in 2021, retellings and expansions of The Great Gatsby have become legal to publish. Nick by Michael Farris Smith (2021) imagines the backstory of Nick Carraway. That same year saw the publication of The Chosen and the Beautiful by Nghi Vo, a retelling with elements of the fantasy genre while tackling issues of race and sexuality, and The Pursued and the Pursuing by AJ Odasso, a queer partial retelling and sequel in which Jay Gatsby survives. Anna-Marie McLemore's own queer retelling, Self-Made Boys: A Great Gatsby Remix, was released in 2022 and was longlisted for the National Book Award for Young People's Literature.

=== Radio ===
The novel has been adapted into a series of radio episodes. The first radio episode was a 1950 half-hour-long adaptation for CBS' Family Hour of Stars starring Kirk Douglas as Gatsby. The novel was read aloud by the BBC World Service in ten parts in 2008. In a 2012 BBC Radio 4 broadcast, The Great Gatsby took the form of a Classic Serial dramatization. It was created by dramatist Robert Forrest.

In 2025, a radio adaptation entitled Gatsby in Harlem was broadcast on BBC Radio 3. The dramatisation was written by Roy Williams, with Malachi Kirby starring as Nick Carraway, Ncuti Gatwa as Jay Gatsby, Gugu Mbatha-Raw as Daisy Buchanan, Chiké Okonkwo as Tom Buchanan. The series won multiple awards at the inaugural British Audio Awards in 2025, including Audio of the Year, Best Audio Drama Adaptation, and Best Performance (won by Gatwa). It was also nominated for Best Adaptation in the BBC Audio Drama Awards 2026.

=== Video games ===
In 2010, Oberon Media released a casual hidden object game called Classic Adventures: The Great Gatsby. In 2011, developer Charlie Hoey and editor Pete Smith created an 8-bit-style online game of The Great Gatsby called The Great Gatsby for NES; in 2022, after the discontinuation of Adobe Flash, they adapted this game to an actual NES ROM file, which can also be played on their website. In 2013, Slate released a short symbolic adaptation called The Great Gatsby: The Video Game.
