= Celestial Eyes =

1924 painting

- Artist: Francis Cugat
- Year: 1924
- Medium: Oil on canvas
- Movement: Art Deco
- Location: Princeton University, Princeton

Celestial Eyes is a 1924 Art Deco painting by Spanish painter Francis Cugat. It is preserved in the Graphic Arts Collection at Princeton University Library.

The painting was commissioned as the cover of F. Scott Fitzgerald's The Great Gatsby, a 1925 novel about the contemporary Jazz Age, one of the most celebrated works of American literature.

Celestial Eyes depicts a lightly delineated woman's face, garbed in a flapper's turban. The sultry eyes and mouth are depicted vividly, suspended in a blue night sky over the Coney Island amusement park and the lights of New York City. The irises of the eyes are in the form of reclining nude women, and a green light appears as a tear falling from the right eye. Fitzgerald rewrote portions of the book after seeing drafts of the cover, to incorporate its imagery into the novel.

The painting has been praised for its abstractness and mysterious charm, and is considered one of the most recognizable cover illustrations in literature. The face is understood to depict Daisy Buchanan, as described in the novel:

Unlike Gatsby and Tom Buchanan, I had no girl whose disembodied face floated along the dark cornices and blinding signs.

The imagery is also reflected in Dr. Eckleburg's billboard in the Valley of Ashes, often seen to represent the eyes of God:

The eyes of Doctor T. J. Eckleburg are blue and gigantic—their irises are one yard high. They look out of no face.

== Editorial story ==
=== The artist ===
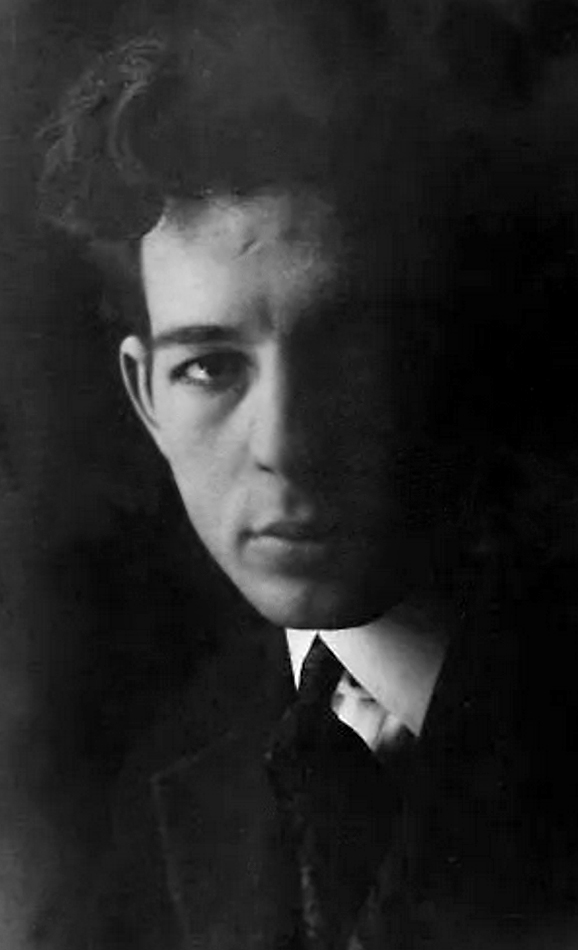
The painter Francis Cugat, photographed in 1917.

The painting was made by Francis Cugat, who was born as Francisco Coradal-Cugat in Spain but grew up in Cuba.

Francis studied at the Academy of Fine Arts of Paris. He moved to the United States at the beginning of the 1920s where he began his career as an illustrator in New York City during the 1940s before moving to Hollywood.

Here he worked as a Technicolor consultant in sixty-eight films in the period between 1948 and 1955. His role led him to collaborate with several players in the film industry, including the actor Douglas Fairbanks.

Cugat was commissioned to cover the novel by an unknown individual in Scribner's art department to illustrate the cover while Fitzgerald was still completing the novel, in 1924, with the book still unfinished and provisionally titled Among Ash Heaps and Millionaires. The author liked the design of Cugat so much to write in a letter from August 1924 while he was in France:

For Christ's sake don't give anyone that jacket you're saving for me. I've written it into the book.

— Francis Scott Fitzgerald, to his editor Maxwell Perkins

For his work, Cugat was paid $100 at the time, about $1,700 in 2023.

=== Evolution of the work ===
In a preliminary sketch, Cugat drew a gray landscape, inspired by the original title Fitzgerald wanted to give to the novel, Among Ash Heaps and Millionaires.

After discarding this concept for being excessively gloomy, the painter then implemented a radical modification that became the foreshadowing of the final cover: a pencil and pastel drawing of the half-hidden face of a typical flapper of the time on the canal of Long Island Sound. Similar to the final version, the woman was characterized by her scarlet lips, at least a clearly heavenly eye, and a tear that gushed out of it.

Perfecting this idea, another draft thus presented two bright eyes that were standing out over a shaded New York City scape. In later versions, Cugat replaced the urban landscape in the shade with dazzling lights reminiscent of those of the carnival and a sparkling scenery, which even evoked a Ferris wheel and with probable allusion to the sparkling amusement park of Coney Island, New York City.

Finally, he painted naked figures inside the woman's irises and a green tint in correspondence of the right eye indicating a tear.

This cover, which was praised by the same Scott Fitzgerald and from his editor Maxwell Perkins, was the only job Cugat did for the publishing house of Charles Scribner's as well as the only one he ever drew and later established himself as the most famous in all of American literature, if not worldwide.

The novel was first published in 1925 and later in 1978 in the pocket edition.

== Inspiration ==
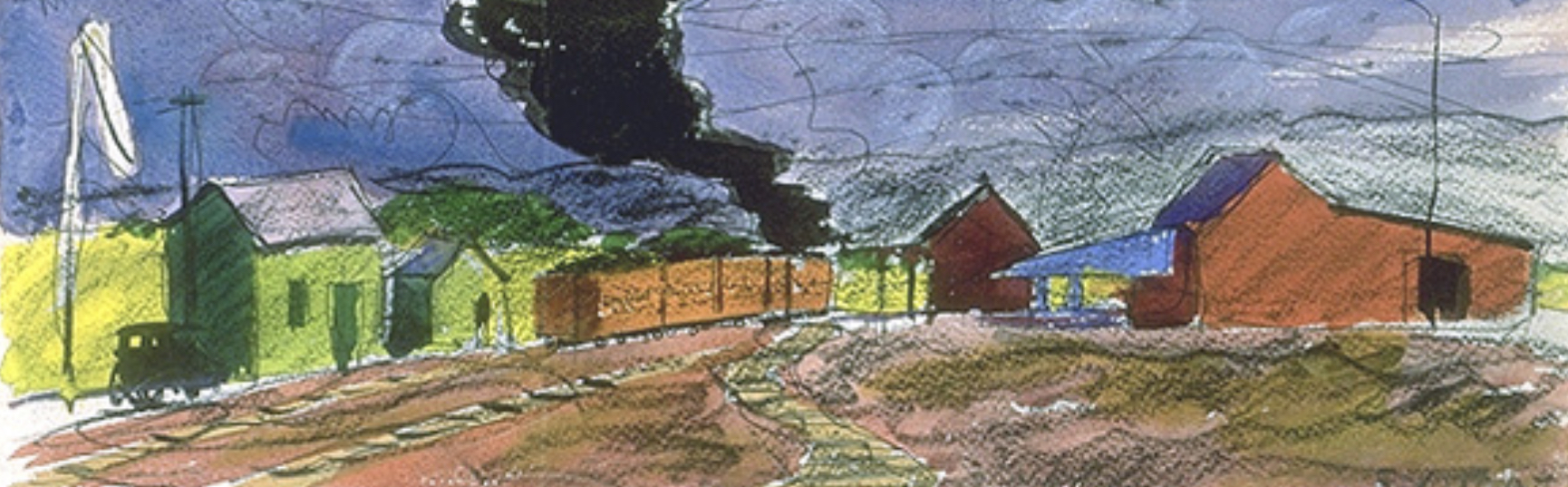
First draft for the cover of Fitzgerald's The Great Gatsby

What makes this work unique, however, is the peculiar collaboration between Fitzgerald and Francis Cugat himself.

Having read only part of the book and taking as inspiration only a few conversations with the author and the title, instead of representing an image taken directly from the text Cugat has created a strongly symbolic one with the eyes of a woman who plays the protagonist, thus transforming a visual work into an abstract representation.

Originally the background was more arid and barren, as in fact in the novel it is the Valley of the Ashes of the second chapter, but at the suggestion of Fitzgerald himself, it was cleverly adapted in the city of New York.

=== Ernest Hemingway's opinion ===
The writer Ernest Hemingway was very close to Fitzgerald, whom he met during his stay in Paris, in the spring of 1925. In his memoirs, published posthumous in 1964, with the title A Moveable Feast, Hemingway recalls his intimate relationship with the writer, and how they had discussed together the book cover that he personally did not appreciate.

Scott brought the book over. It had a garish dust jacket and I remember being embarrassed by the violence, bad taste and slippery look of it. It looked like the book jacket for a book of bad science fiction. Scott told me not to be put off by it, that it had to do with a billboard along a highway in Long Island that was important in the story. I took it off to read the book

— Ernest Hemingway, A Moveable Feast

The relationship between the inspiration for the cover and its correspondence with the text of the novel has been the subject of debate.

==== The billboard ====
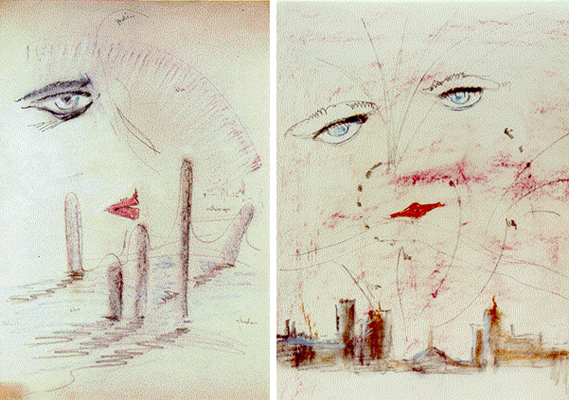
A draft by Cugat; although it almost appears as definitive, with the large celestial eyes already in the foreground, the background appears barren and desolate; it seems to depict the "Valley of Ashes" of the second chapter.

Several critics, according to Hemingway, suggest that the cover represents the eyes of a faded billboard, which appears in the second chapter of the novel, that were inspired by Cugat.

The billboard is located in a barren, desolate area, called the "Valley of the Ashes" near the garage of mechanic George Wilson, and perhaps had been exposed to advertise an ophthalmologist of the Queens, New York, Dr. Eckleburg, but later abandoned.

The description that Fitzgerald performs is very similar to the cover: the gigantic tall eyes still strike at a distance, rest on a nonexistent nose and the city of New York, where he would have had such a study ophthalmologist, is represented in the lower part of the cover.

But above the gray land and the spasms of bleak dust which drift endlessly over it, you perceive, after a moment, the eyes of Doctor T. J. Eckleburg. The eyes of Doctor T. J. Eckleburg are blue and gigantic—their irises are one yard high. They look out of no face, but, instead, from a pair of enormous yellow spectacles which pass over a nonexistent nose. Evidently, some wild wag of an oculist set them there to fatten his practice in the borough of Queens, and then sank down himself into eternal blindness, or forgot them and moved away. But his eyes, dimmed a little by many paintless days, under sun and rain, brood on over the solemn dumping ground.

— Francis Scott Fitzgerald, The Great Gatsby

=== Daisy's portrait ===
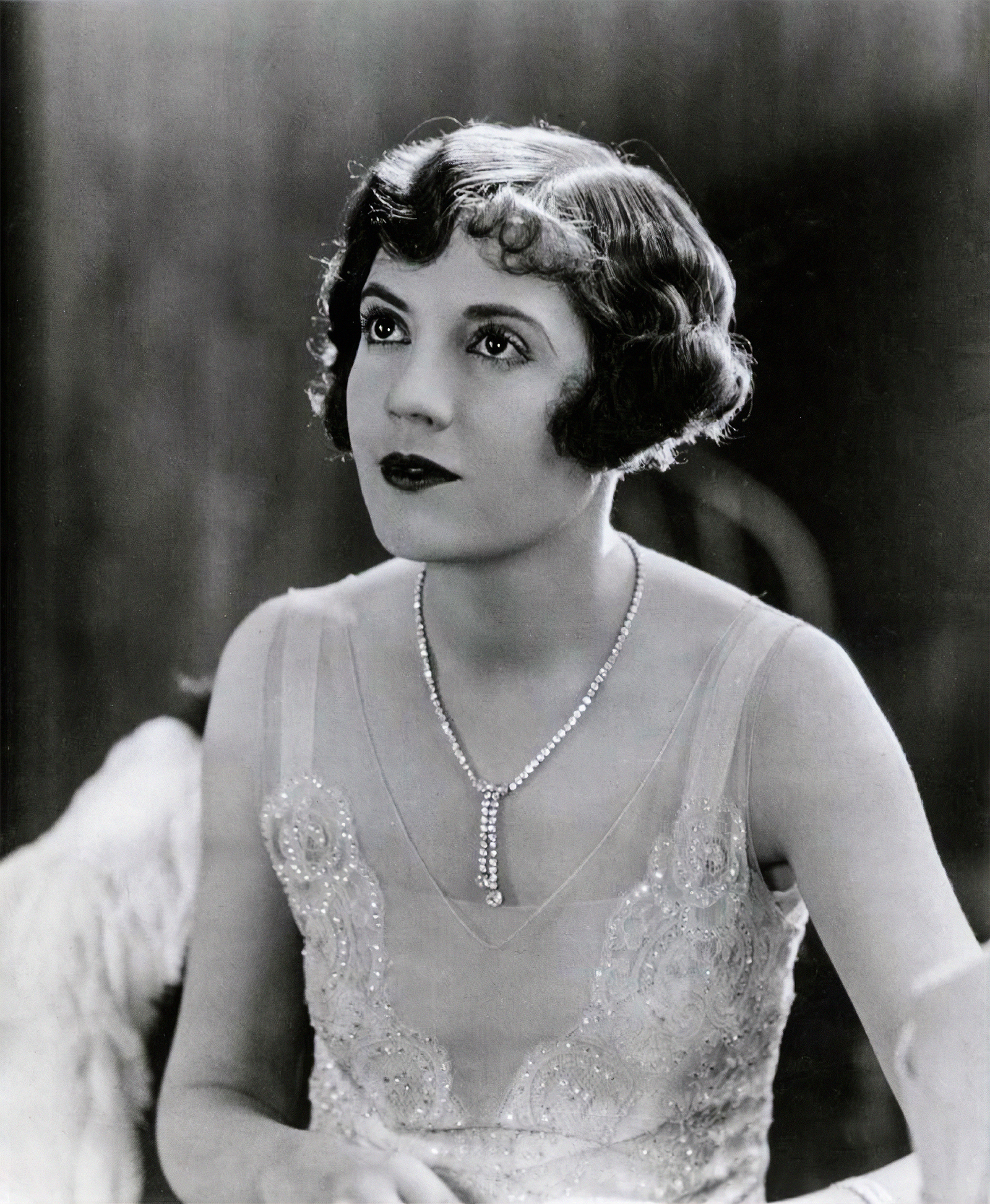
Daisy Buchanan played by Lois Wilson in the 1926 film adaptation.

However, there is also the hypothesis that the cover may have been inspired by the character of Daisy, cousin of the story's narrator, Nick Carraway.

As the most popular girl in Louisville, Kentucky, Daisy had an affair during the 1910s with the then anonymous and penniless James Gatz. But the outbreak of the First World War forces the latter to leave for Europe and, despite the vain promise to return, too much time that has elapsed drives Daisy to marry Tom Buchanan, a wealthy polo player.

The hypothesis is supported by the fact that the lips are certainly feminine as well as the eyebrows and eyes, vaguely afflicted and on the verge of crying. In addition, most of the plot of the novel takes place in New York City.

Her face was sad and lovely with bright things in it, bright eyes and a bright passionate mouth, but there was an excitement in her voice that men who had cared for her found difficult to forget: a singing compulsion, a whispered "Listen," a promise that she had done gay, exciting things just a while since and that there were gay, exciting things hovering in the next hour. [...] Unlike Gatsby and Tom Buchanan, I had no girl whose disembodied face floated along the dark cornices and blinding signs, and so I drew up the girl beside me, tightening my arms. Her wan, scornful mouth smiled, and so I drew her up again closer, this time to my face.

— Francis Scott Fitzgerald, The Great Gatsby

This, on the other hand, would raise the question of how much Fitzgerald and Cugat knew in advance of each other's work.

Correspondence between Fitzgerald and Maxwell Perkins would reveal that the cover had been commissioned in advance, but the writer still delayed the delivery of the novel. Nevertheless, it is evident from the correspondence that Perkins had already read part of the book and would have kept its cover for Fitzgerald.

=== Rediscovery of the painting ===
Charles Scribner's cousin, George Schieffelin, found the sketch in a bin of the publishing house where unused documents were thrown. He preserved the painting, and bequeathed it to the Princeton University Library for the Graphic Arts Collection, where it is still kept today.

== See also ==
- Roaring Twenties
