= F. Scott Fitzgerald bibliography =

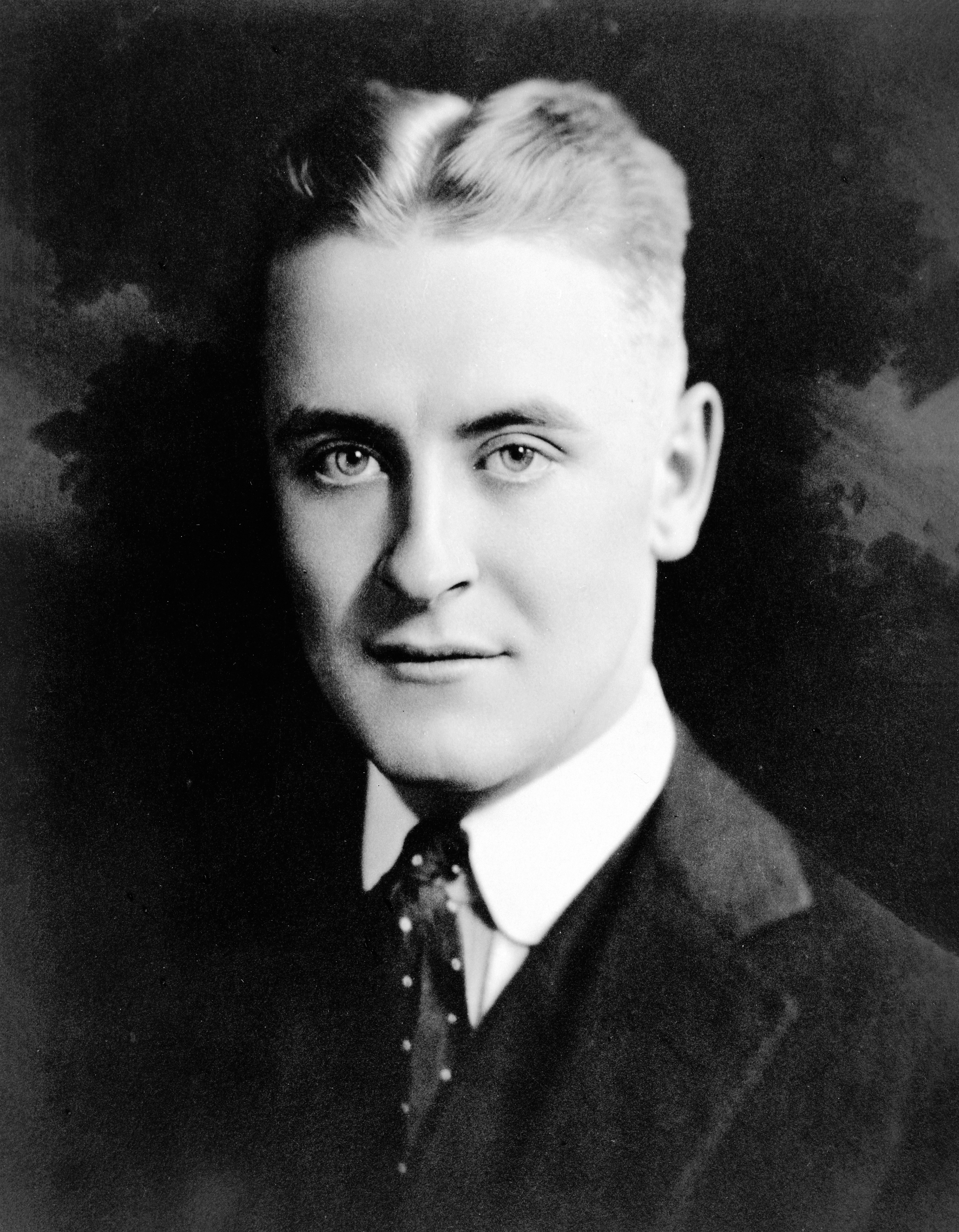
- Novels↙: 5
- Stories↙: 171
- Collections↙: 10
- Poems↙: 25
- Plays↙: 1

Francis Scott Key Fitzgerald (September 24, 1896 – December 21, 1940) was an American author of novels and short stories, whose works are the paradigmatic writings of the Jazz Age. He is widely regarded as one of the greatest American writers of the 20th century. Fitzgerald is considered a member of the "Lost Generation" of the 1920s. He finished four novels: This Side of Paradise, The Beautiful and Damned, The Great Gatsby (his most famous), and Tender Is the Night. A fifth, unfinished novel, The Last Tycoon, was published posthumously. Fitzgerald also wrote many short stories that treat themes of youth and promise along with age and despair.

== Novels ==
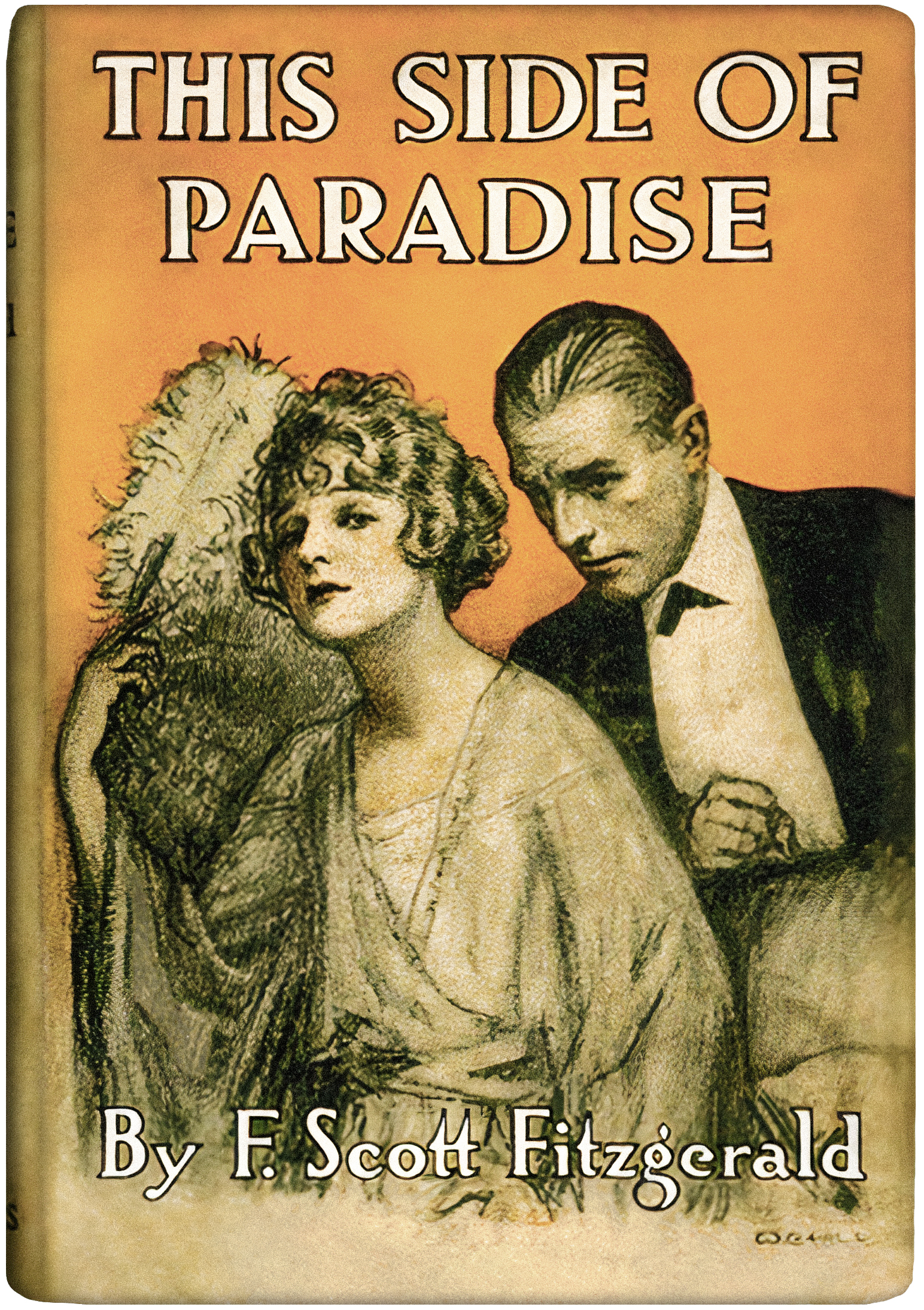
Dust jacket of This Side of Paradise (1920)

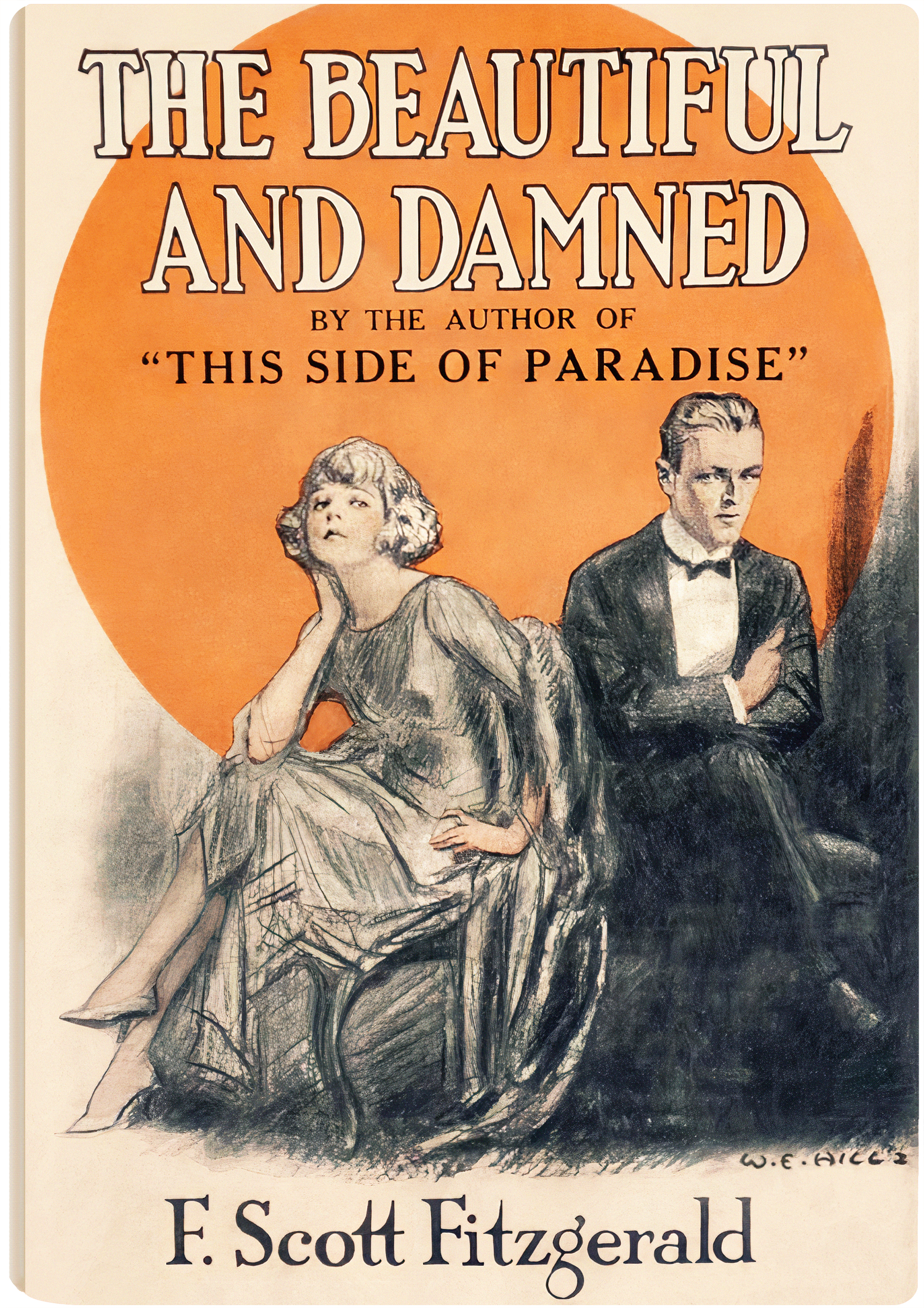
Dust jacket of The Beautiful and Damned (1922)

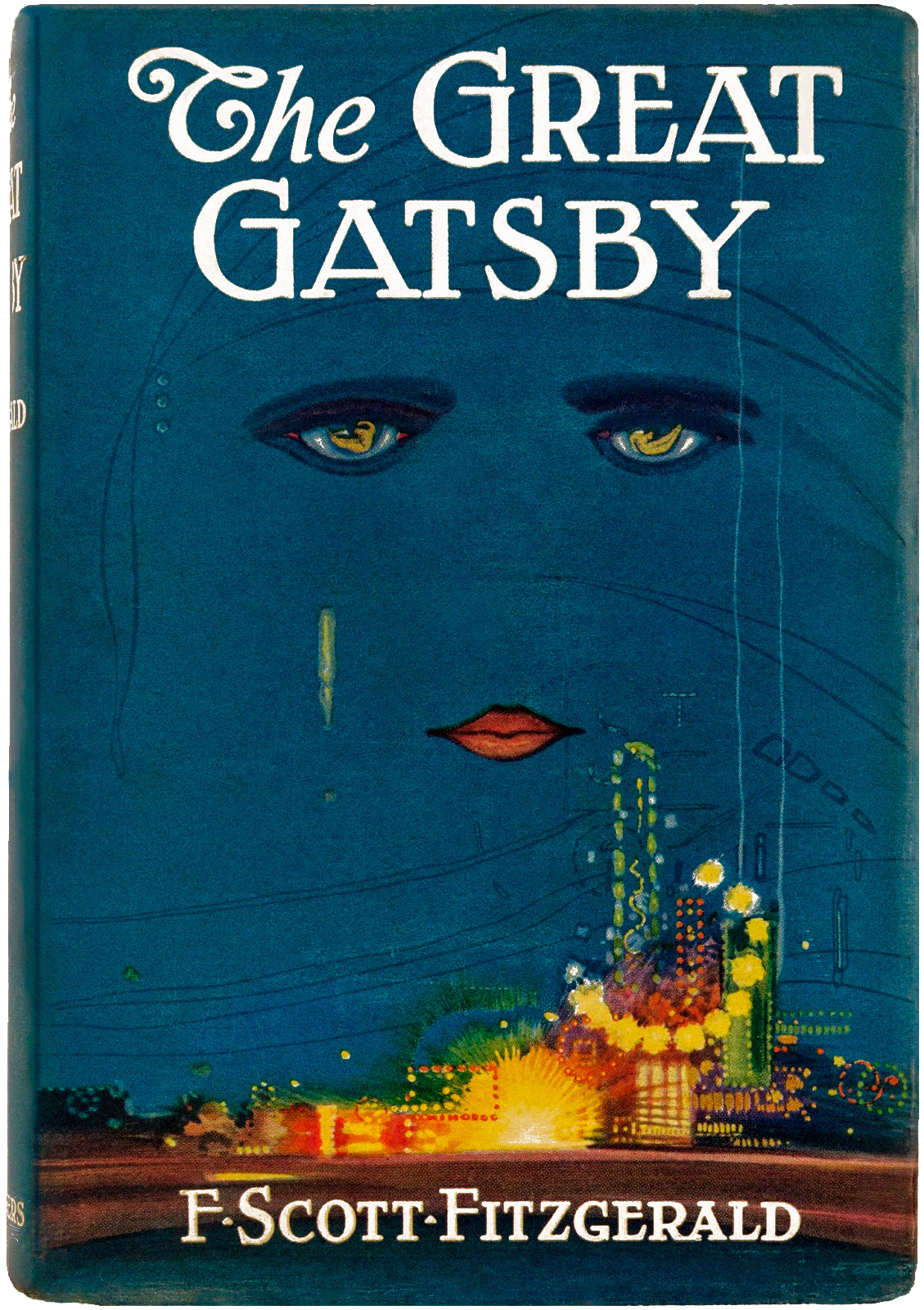
Dust jacket of The Great Gatsby (1925)

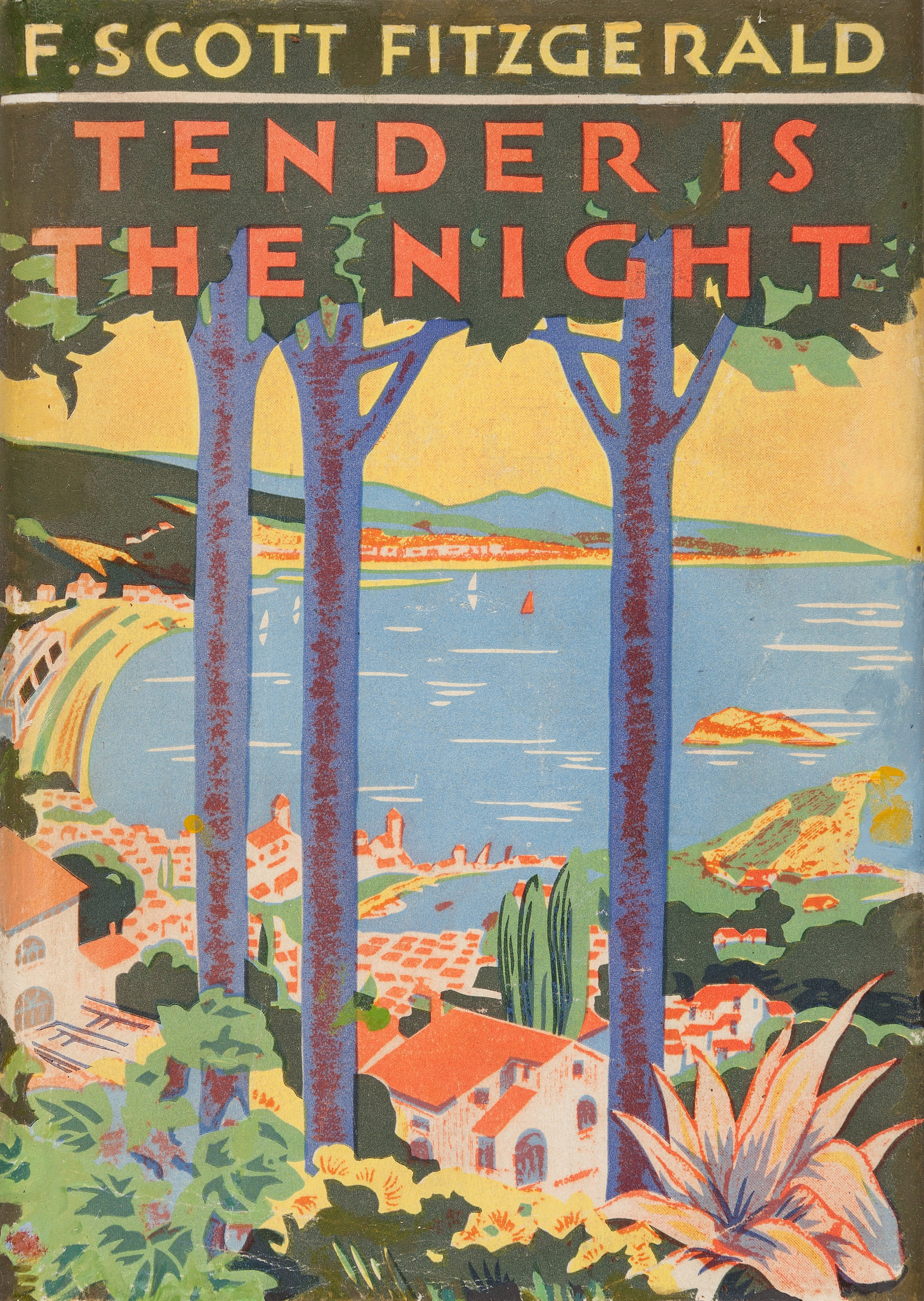
Dust jacket of Tender Is the Night (1934)

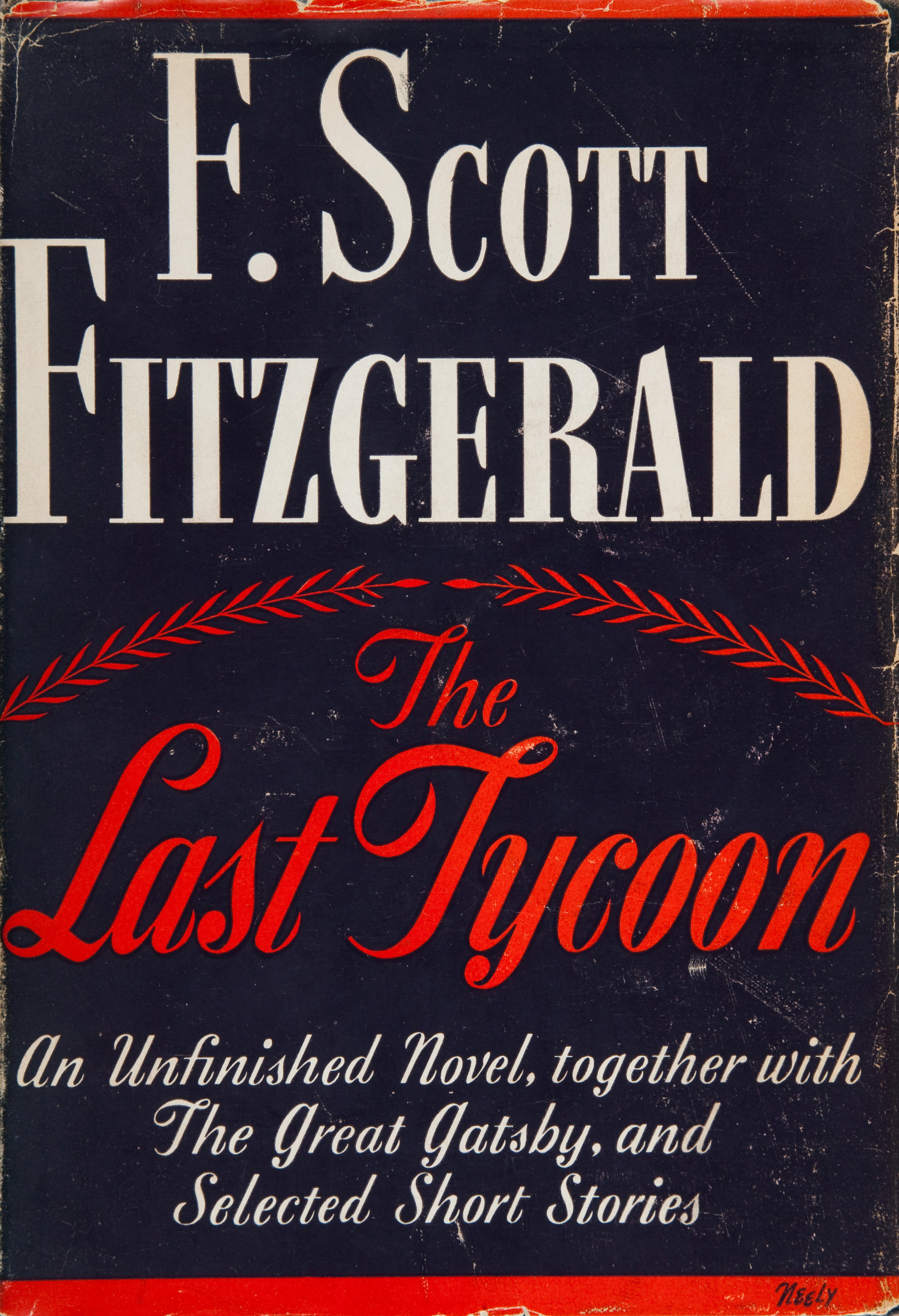
Dust jacket of The Last Tycoon (1941)

Title	Publication	Notes	E-text
This Side of Paradise	Scribners, 1920		Wikisource
The Beautiful and Damned	Scribners, 1922		Wikisource
The Great Gatsby	Scribners, 1925		Wikisource; Read
Tender Is the Night	Scribners, 1934	Original version (1934); Version edited by Malcolm Cowley (1951)	Read
The Last Tycoon (First version); The Love of the Last Tycoon (Second version)	Scribners, 1941; Cambridge University, 1993	Unfinished; published posthumously Version edited by Edmund Wilson (1941); Version edited by Matthew Bruccoli (1993)	Read

== Short story collections ==
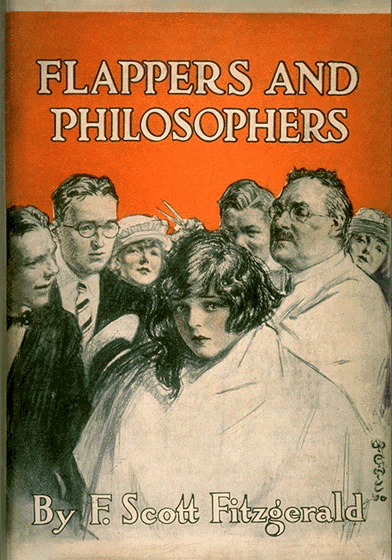
Dust jacket of Flappers and Philosophers (1920)

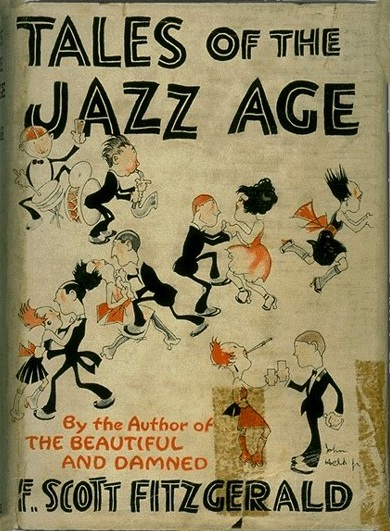
Dust jacket of Tales of the Jazz Age (1922)

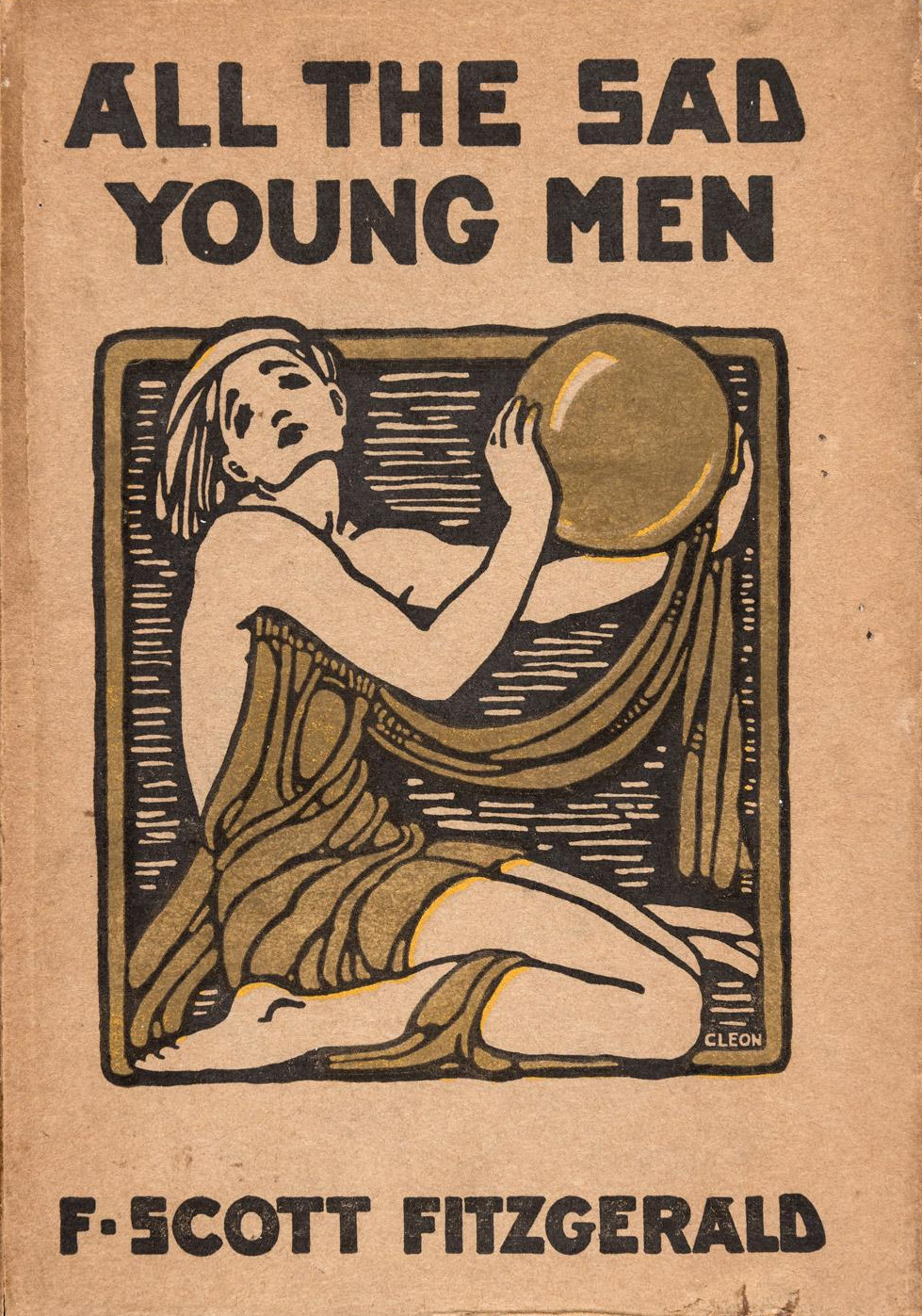
Dust jacket of All the Sad Young Men (1926)

Title	Publication	Contents	E-text
During Fitzgerald lifetime
Flappers and Philosophers	Scribners, 1920	8 short stories: "The Offshore Pirate", "The Ice Palace", "Head and Shoulders", "The Cut-Glass Bowl", "Bernice Bobs Her Hair", "Benediction", "Dalyrimple Goes Wrong", "The Four Fists"	Read; Read
Tales of the Jazz Age	Scribners, 1922	11 short stories: "The Jelly-Bean", "The Camel's Back", "May Day", "Porcelain and Pink", "The Diamond as Big as the Ritz", "The Curious Case of Benjamin Button", "Tarquin of Cheapside", "Oh Russet Witch!", "The Lees of Happiness", "Mr. Icky", "Jemina"	Read; Read
All the Sad Young Men	Scribners, 1926	9 short stories: "The Rich Boy", "Winter Dreams", "The Baby Party", "Absolution", "Rags Martin-Jones and the Pr-nce of W-les", "The Adjuster", "Hot and Cold Blood", "The Sensible Thing", "Gretchen's Forty Winks"	Read
Taps at Reveille	Scribners, 1935	18 short stories; Stories about Basil Duke Lee: "The Scandal Detectives", "The Freshest Boy", "He Thinks He's Wonderful", "The Captured Shadow" and "The Perfect Life"; Stories about Josephine Perry: "First Blood", "A Nice Quiet Place" and "A Woman with a Past"; Others: "Crazy Sunday", "Two Wrongs", "The Night of Chancellorsville", "The Last of the Belles", "Majesty", "Family in the Wind", "A Short Trip Home", "One Interne", "The Fiend", "Babylon Revisited"	
Posthumous
The Stories of F. Scott Fitzgerald	Scribners, 1951	28 short stories, 10 not previously collected and 4 sets of editorial notes Previously uncollected: "Magnetism", "The Rough Crossing", "The Bridal Party", "An Alcoholic Case", "The Long Way Out", "Financing Finnegan", "A Patriotic Short", "Two Old-Timers", "Three Hours Between Planes", "The Lost Decade"	Read
Babylon Revisited and Other Stories	Scribners, 1960	10 short stories; "The Ice Palace", "May Day", "The Diamond as Big as the Ritz", "Winter Dreams", "Absolution", "The Rich Boy", "The Freshest Boy", "Babylon Revisited", "Crazy Sunday", "The Long Way Out"	
The Pat Hobby Stories	Scribners, 1962	All 17 short stories about the fictional screenwriter Pat Hobby	Read
The Apprentice Fiction of F. Scott Fitzgerald	Rutgers University Press, 1965	16 early stories	Read
The Basil and Josephine Stories	Scribners, 1973	14 short stories; 9 about Basil and 5 about Josephine: Stories about Basil Duke Lee: "That Kind of Party", "The Scandal Detectives", "A Night at the Fair", "The Freshest Boy", "He Thinks He's Wonderful", "The Captured Shadow", "The Perfect Life", "Forging Ahead", "Basil and Cleopatra"; Stories about Josephine Perry: "First Blood", "A Nice Quiet Place", "A Woman with a Past", "A Snobbish Story", "Emotional Bankruptcy"	Read
Bits of Paradise	Scribners, 1974	21 stories by Fitzgerald and his wife Zelda by F. Scott: "The Popular Girl", "Love in the Night", "A Penny Spent", "The Dance", "Jacobs Ladder", "The Swimmers", "The Hotel Child", "A New Leaf", "What a Handsome Pair!", "Last Kiss", "Dearly Beloved" by Zelda: "The Original Follies Girl", "Southern Girl", "The Girl the Prince Liked", "The Girl with Talent", "A Millionaire's Girl", "Poor Working Girl", "Miss Ella", "The Continental Angle", "A Couple of Nuts"; Scott and Zelda: "Our Own Movie Queen"	Read
The Price Was High	Harcourt, 1979	50 uncollected stories	
The Short Stories of F. Scott Fitzgerald	Scribners, 1989	all available in earlier collections	
I'd Die For You: And Other Lost Stories	Simon & Schuster, April 2017	18 stories, scenarios and fragments	

== Letters ==
Title	Publication	Contents
Posthumous
The Letters of F. Scott Fitzgerald	Scribners, 1964	Letters from Fitzgerald to: his wife, his daughter, his cousin Cecilia, Hemingway, Perkins, Bishop, Turnbull, Gauss, Ober, Wilson, and Gerald & Shelia Murphy
Dear Scott/Dear Max	Scribners, 1971	Correspondence between Fitzgerald and Maxwell Perkins.
As Ever, Scott Fitz—	J. B. Lippincott & Co., 1972	Correspondence between Fitzgerald and Harold Ober.
Correspondence of F. Scott Fitzgerald	Random House, 1980	
F. Scott Fitzgerald: A Life in Letters	Scribners, 1994	

== Other works ==
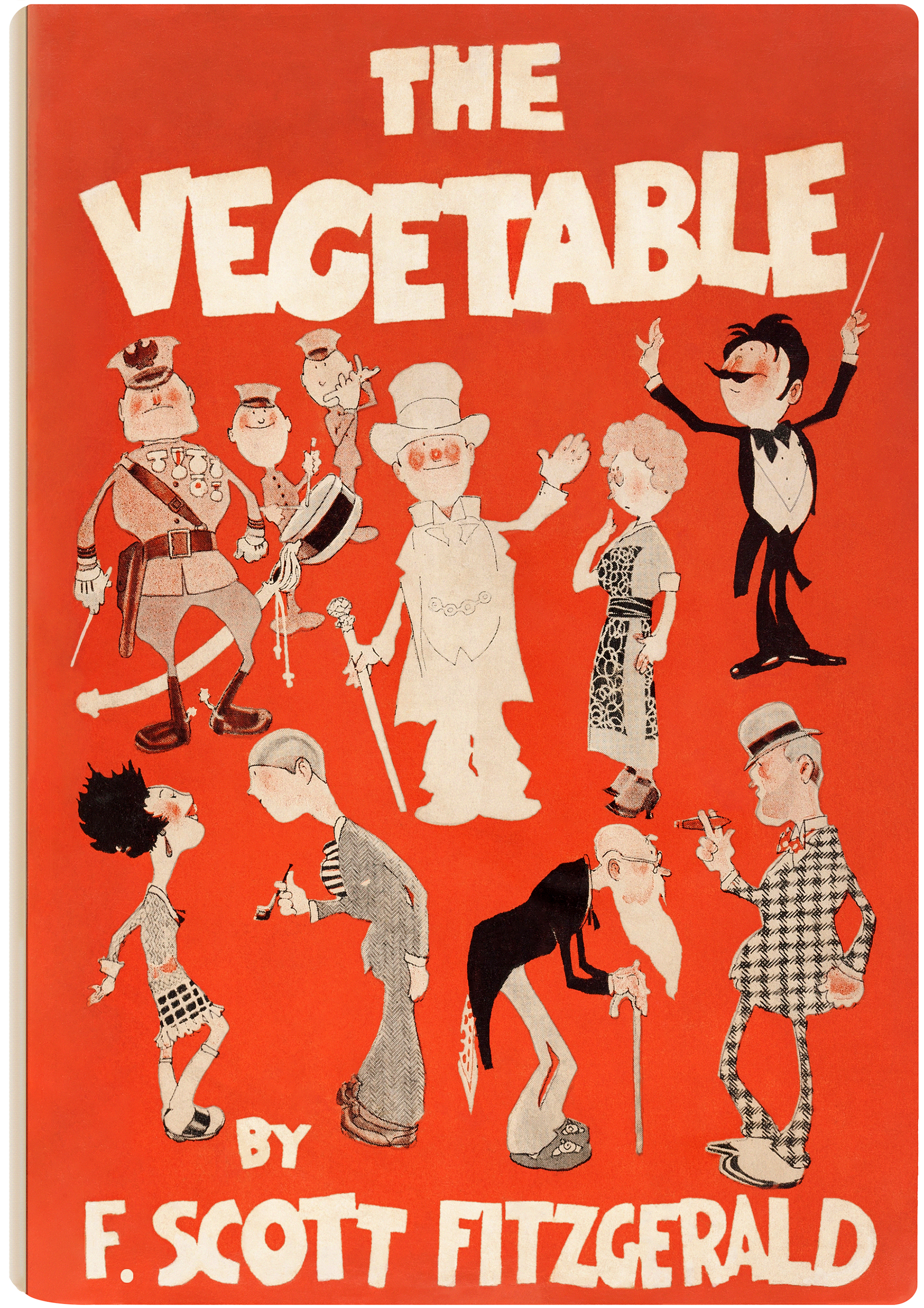
Dust jacket of The Vegetable (New York: Scribners, 1923)

Title	Publication	Contents	E-text
The Vegetable	Scribners, 1923	play	
Posthumous
The Crack-Up	New Directions, 1945	10 essays, selections from the notebooks and letters	
Afternoon of an Author	Scribners, 1958	13 stories and 7 essays, with individual editorial notes	Internet Archive
Poems 1911–1940	S.C.: Bruccoli Clark, 1981	25 poems	
Novels and Stories 1920–1922	Library of America, 2000	This Side of Paradise; Flappers and Philosophers; The Beautiful and Damned; Tales of the Jazz Age	
The Great Gatsby, All the Sad Young Men & Other Writings 1920–1926	Library of America, 2022	The Great Gatsby; All the Sad Young Men; 16 Stories and 9 essays	
Before Gatsby: The First Twenty-Six Stories	University of South Carolina Press, 2001	all available in earlier collections	

== Short stories ==
=== 1909–1919 ===
Title	Publication	Collected in	E-text
"The Mystery of the Raymond Mortgage"	St. Paul Academy Now and Then (Oct 1909)	The Apprentice Fiction of F. Scott Fitzgerald (1965)	
"Reade, Substitute Right Half"	St. Paul Academy Now and Then (Feb 1910)	The Apprentice Fiction of F. Scott Fitzgerald (1965)	
"A Debt of Honor"	St. Paul Academy Now and Then (March 1910)	The Apprentice Fiction of F. Scott Fitzgerald (1965)	
"The Room with the Green Blinds"	St. Paul Academy Now and Then (June 1911)	The Apprentice Fiction of F. Scott Fitzgerald (1965)	
"A Luckless Santa Claus"	Newman News (Dec 24, 1912)	The Apprentice Fiction of F. Scott Fitzgerald (1965)	
"Pain and the Scientist"	Newman News (1913)	The Apprentice Fiction of F. Scott Fitzgerald (1965)	
"The Trail of the Duke"	Newman News (June 1913)	The Apprentice Fiction of F. Scott Fitzgerald (1965)	
"Shadow Laurels"	Nassau Literary Magazine (April 1915)	The Apprentice Fiction of F. Scott Fitzgerald (1965)	
"The Ordeal"	Nassau Literary Magazine (June 1915)	The Apprentice Fiction of F. Scott Fitzgerald (1965)	
"The Débutante"	Nassau Literary Magazine (Jan 1917)	The Apprentice Fiction of F. Scott Fitzgerald (1965)	
"The Spire and the Gargoyle"	Nassau Literary Magazine (Feb 1917)	The Apprentice Fiction of F. Scott Fitzgerald (1965)	
"Tarquin of Cheapside"	Nassau Literary Magazine (April 1917); The Smart Set (Feb 1921)	The Apprentice Fiction of F. Scott Fitzgerald (1965)	Read
"Babes in the Woods"	Nassau Literary Magazine (May 1917)	The Apprentice Fiction of F. Scott Fitzgerald (1965)	
"Sentiment—And the Use of Rouge"	Nassau Literary Magazine (June 1917)	The Apprentice Fiction of F. Scott Fitzgerald (1965)	
"The Pierian Springs and the Last Straw"	Nassau Literary Magazine (Oct 1917)	The Apprentice Fiction of F. Scott Fitzgerald (1965)	

=== 1920–1924 ===
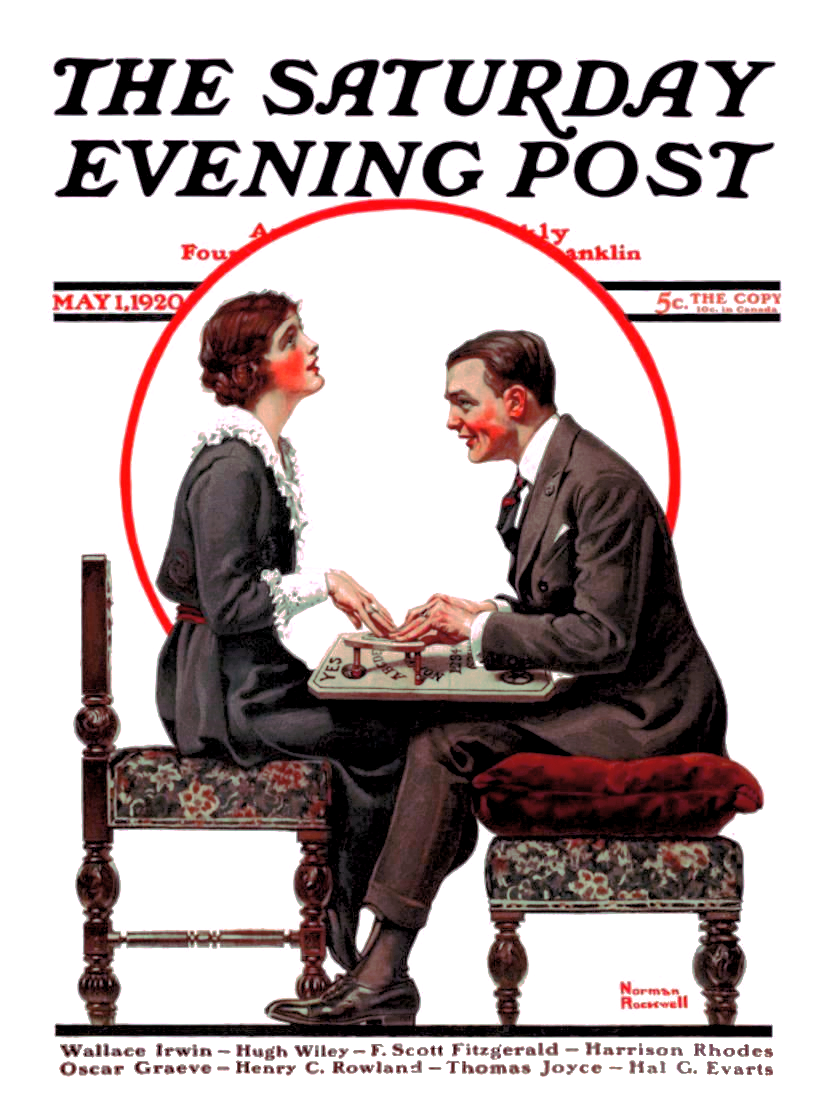
May 1920 cover of Saturday Evening Post containing "Bernice Bobs Her Hair"; Fitzgerald's name appears on the cover.

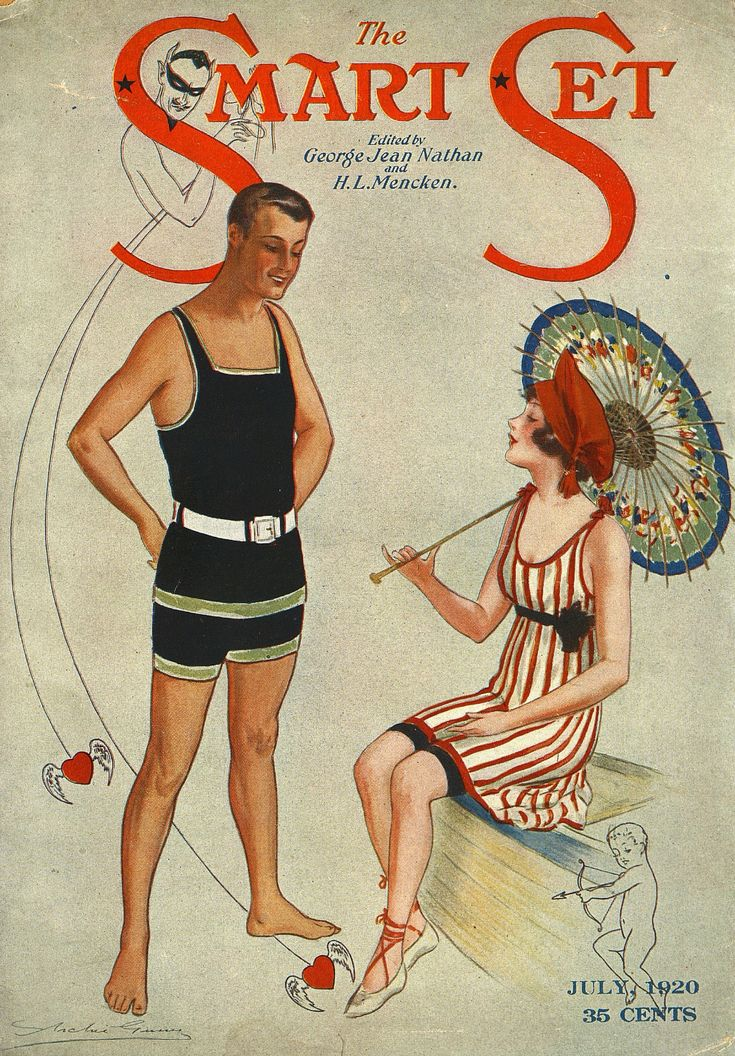
July 1920 cover of The Smart Set containing "May Day".

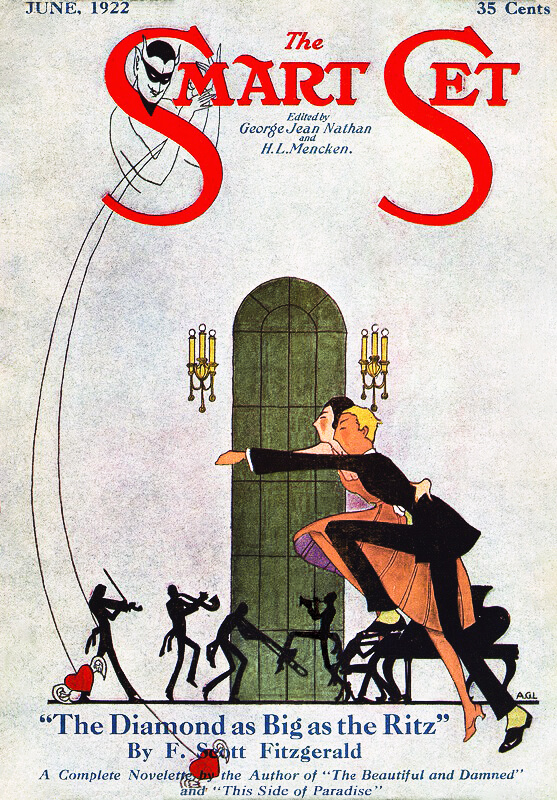
June 1922 cover of The Smart Set containing "The Diamond as Big as the Ritz".

Title	Publication	Collected in	E-text
"Porcelain and Pink"	The Smart Set (Jan 1920)	Tales of the Jazz Age (1922)	Read
"Head and Shoulders"	The Saturday Evening Post (21 Feb 1920)	Flappers and Philosophers (1920)	Read
"Benediction"	The Smart Set (Feb 1920)	Flappers and Philosophers (1920)	Read
"Dalyrimple Goes Wrong"	The Smart Set (Feb 1920)	Flappers and Philosophers (1920)	Read
"Myra Meets His Family"	The Saturday Evening Post (March 20, 1920)	The Price Was High (1979)	
"Mister Icky"	The Smart Set (March 1920)	Tales of the Jazz Age (1922)	Read
"The Camel’s Back"	The Saturday Evening Post (April 24, 1920)	Tales of the Jazz Age (1922)	Read
"Bernice Bobs Her Hair"	The Saturday Evening Post (May 1, 1920)	Flappers and Philosophers (1920)	Read
"The Ice Palace"	The Saturday Evening Post (May 22, 1920)	Flappers and Philosophers (1920)	Read
"The Offshore Pirate"	The Saturday Evening Post (May 29, 1920)	Flappers and Philosophers (1920)	Read
"The Cut-Glass Bowl"	Scribner’s Magazine (May 1920)	Flappers and Philosophers (1920)	Read
"The Four Fists"	Scribner’s Magazine (June 1920)	Flappers and Philosophers (1920)	Read
"The Smilers"	The Smart Set (June 1920)	The Price Was High (1979)	
"May Day"	The Smart Set (July 1920)	Tales of the Jazz Age (1922)	Read
"The Jelly-Bean"	Metropolitan Magazine (Oct 1920)	Tales of the Jazz Age (1922)	Read
"The Lees of Happiness"	Chicago Sunday Tribune (Dec 12, 1920)	Tales of the Jazz Age (1922)	Read
"Jemina"	Vanity Fair (Jan 1921)	Tales of the Jazz Age (1922)	Read
"O Russet Witch!"	Metropolitan Magazine (Feb 1921)	Tales of the Jazz Age (1922)	Read
"The Popular Girl"	The Saturday Evening Post (Feb 11 & 18, 1922)	Bits of Paradise (1974)	
"Two for a Cent"	Metropolitan Magazine (April 1922)	The Price Was High (1979)	
"The Curious Case of Benjamin Button"	Collier’s (May 27, 1922)	Tales of the Jazz Age (1922)	Read
"The Diamond as Big as the Ritz"	The Smart Set (June 1922)	Tales of the Jazz Age (1922)	Read
"Winter Dreams"	Metropolitan Magazine (Dec 1922)	All the Sad Young Men (1926)	Read
"Dice, Brassknuckles & Guitar"	Hearst's International Cosmopolitan (May 1923)	The Price Was High (1979)	Read
"Hot & Cold Blood"	Hearst’s International Cosmopolitan (Aug 1923)	All the Sad Young Men (1926)	
"Gretchen’s Forty Winks"	The Saturday Evening Post (March 15, 1924)	All the Sad Young Men (1926)	
"Diamond Dick and the First Law of Woman"	Hearst’s International Cosmopolitan (April 1924)	The Price Was High (1979)	
"The Third Casket"	The Saturday Evening Post (May 31, 1924)	The Price Was High (1979)	
"Absolution"	The American Mercury (June 1924)	All the Sad Young Men (1926)	
"The Sensible Thing"	Liberty (July 5, 1924)	All the Sad Young Men (1926)	
"The Unspeakable Egg"	The Saturday Evening Post (July 12, 1924)	The Price Was High (1979)	
"John Jackson's Arcady"	The Saturday Evening Post (July 26, 1924)	The Price Was High (1979)	

=== 1925–1929 ===
Title	Publication	Collected in	E-text
"The Baby Party"	Hearst’s International Cosmopolitan (Feb 1925)	All the Sad Young Men (1926)	
"The Pusher-in-the-Face"	Woman’s Home Companion (Feb 1925)	The Price Was High (1979)	
"Love in the Night"	The Saturday Evening Post (March 14, 1925)	Bits of Paradise (1974)	Read
"One of My Oldest Friends"	Woman’s Home Companion (Sep 1925)	The Price Was High (1979)	
"The Adjuster"	The Redbook Magazine (Sep 1925)	All the Sad Young Men (1926)	
"A Penny Spent"	The Saturday Evening Post (Oct 10, 1925)	Bits of Paradise (1974)	
"Not in the Guidebook"	Woman’s Home Companion (Nov 1925)	The Price Was High (1979)	
"The Rich Boy"	The Redbook Magazine (Jan/Feb 1926)	All the Sad Young Men (1926)	
"Presumption"	The Saturday Evening Post (Jan 9, 1926)	The Price Was High (1979)	
"The Adolescent Marriage"	The Saturday Evening Post (March 6, 1926)	The Price Was High (1979)	
"The Dance"	The Redbook Magazine (June 1926)	Bits of Paradise (1974)	
"Rags Martin-Jones and the Pr-nce of W-les"	McCall's (July 1926)	All the Sad Young Men (1926)	
"Your Way and Mine"	Woman’s Home Companion (May 1927)	The Price Was High (1979)	
"Jacob’s Ladder"	The Saturday Evening Post (Aug 20, 1927)	Bits of Paradise (1974)	Read
"The Love Boat"	The Saturday Evening Post (Oct 8, 1927)	The Price Was High (1979)	
"A Short Trip Home"	The Saturday Evening Post (Dec 17, 1927)	Taps at Reveille (1935)	Read
"The Bowl"	The Saturday Evening Post (Jan 21, 1928)	The Price Was High (1979)	Reas
"Magnetism"	The Saturday Evening Post (March 3, 1928)	The Stories of F. Scott Fitzgerald (1951)	Read
"The Scandal Detectives"	The Saturday Evening Post (April 28, 1928)	Taps at Reveille (1935) & The Basil and Josephine Stories (1973)	
"A Night at the Fair"	The Saturday Evening Post (July 21, 1928)	The Basil and Josephine Stories (1973)	Read
"The Freshest Boy"	The Saturday Evening Post (July 28, 1928)	Taps at Reveille (1935) & The Basil and Josephine Stories (1973)	
"He Thinks He's Wonderful"	The Saturday Evening Post (Sep 29, 1928)	Taps at Reveille (1935) & The Basil and Josephine Stories (1973)	
"The Captured Shadow"	The Saturday Evening Post (Dec 29, 1928)	Taps at Reveille (1935) & The Basil and Josephine Stories (1973)	
"Outside the Cabinet-Maker’s"	The Century Magazine (Dec 1928)	Afternoon of an Author (1958)	Read
"The Perfect Life"	The Saturday Evening Post (Jan 5, 1929)	Taps at Reveille (1935) & The Basil and Josephine Stories (1973)	
"The Last of the Belles"	The Saturday Evening Post (March 2, 1929)	Taps at Reveille (1935)	
"Forging Ahead"	The Saturday Evening Post (March 30, 1929)	The Basil and Josephine Stories (1973)	Read
"Basil and Cleopatra"	The Saturday Evening Post (April 27, 1929)	The Basil and Josephine Stories (1973)	Read
"The Rough Crossing"	The Saturday Evening Post (June 8, 1929)	The Stories of F. Scott Fitzgerald (1951)	Read
"Majesty"	The Saturday Evening Post (July 13, 1929)	Taps at Reveille (1935)	
"At Your Age"	The Saturday Evening Post (Aug 17, 1929)	The Price Was High (1979)	Read
"The Swimmers"	The Saturday Evening Post (Oct 19, 1929)	Bits of Paradise (1974)	Read

=== 1930–1934 ===
Title	Publication	Collected in	E-text
"Two Wrongs"	The Saturday Evening Post (Jan 18, 1930)	Taps at Reveille (1935); The Basil and Josephine Stories (1973)	
"First Blood"	The Saturday Evening Post (April 5, 1930)	Taps at Reveille (1935); The Basil and Josephine Stories (1973)	
"A Nice Quiet Place"	The Saturday Evening Post (May 31, 1930)	Taps at Reveille (1935); The Basil and Josephine Stories (1973)	
"The Bridal Party"	The Saturday Evening Post (Aug 9, 1930)	The Stories of F. Scott Fitzgerald	Read
"A Woman with a Past"	The Saturday Evening Post (Sep 6, 1930)	Taps at Reveille (1935); The Basil and Josephine Stories (1973)	
"One Trip Abroad"	The Saturday Evening Post (Oct 11, 1930)	Afternoon of an Author (1958)	Read
"A Snobbish Story"	The Saturday Evening Post (Nov 29, 1930)	The Basil and Josephine Stories (1973)	
"The Hotel Child"	The Saturday Evening Post (Jan 31, 1931)	Bits of Paradise (1974)	Read
"Babylon Revisited"	The Saturday Evening Post, (Feb 21, 1931)	Taps at Reveille (1935)	Read
"Indecision"	The Saturday Evening Post (May 16, 1931)	The Price Was High (1979)	
"A New Leaf"	The Saturday Evening Post (July 4, 1931)	Bits of Paradise (1974)	Read
"Emotional Bankruptcy"	The Saturday Evening Post (Aug 15, 1931)	The Basil and Josephine Stories (1973)	Read
"Between Three and Four"	The Saturday Evening Post (Sep 5, 1931)	The Price Was High (1979)	Read
"A Change of Class"	The Saturday Evening Post (Sep 26, 1931)	The Price Was High (1979)	
"A Freeze-Out"	The Saturday Evening Post (Dec 19, 1931)	The Price Was High (1979)	Read
"Diagnosis"	The Saturday Evening Post (Feb 20, 1932)	The Price Was High (1979)	
"Six of One"	Redbook (Feb 1932)	The Price Was High (1979)	Read
"Flight and Pursuit"	The Saturday Evening Post (May 14, 1932)	The Price Was High (1979)	Read
"Family in the Wind"	The Saturday Evening Post (June 4, 1932)	Taps at Reveille (1935)	
"The Rubber Check"	The Saturday Evening Post (Aug 6, 1932)	The Price Was High (1979)	
"What a Handsome Pair!"	The Saturday Evening Post (Aug 27, 1932)	Bits of Paradise (1974)	Read
"Crazy Sunday"	The American Mercury (Oct 1932)	Taps at Reveille (1935)	
"One Interne"	The Saturday Evening Post (Nov 5, 1932)	Taps at Reveille (1935)	Read
"On Schedule"	The Saturday Evening Post (March 18, 1933)	The Price Was High (1979)	Read
"More Than Just a House"	The Saturday Evening Post (June 24, 1933)	The Price Was High (1979)	Read
"I Got Shoes"	The Saturday Evening Post (Sep 1933)	The Price Was High (1979)	
"The Family Bus"	The Saturday Evening Post (Nov 1933)	The Price Was High (1979)	
"No Flowers"	The Saturday Evening Post (July 1934)	The Price Was High (1979)	
"New Types"	The Saturday Evening Post (Sep 1934)	The Price Was High (1979)	
"In the Darkest Hour"	Redbook (Oct 1934)	The Price Was High (1979)	
"Her Last Case"	The Saturday Evening Post (Nov 1934)	The Price Was High (1979)	

=== 1935–1940 ===
Title	Publication	Collected in	E-text
"The Fiend"	Esquire (Jan 1935)	Taps at Reveille (1935)	Read
"The Night of Chancellorsville"	Esquire (Feb 1935)	Taps at Reveille (1935)	Read
"Shaggy's Morning"	Esquire (May 1935)	Not part of a collection	Read
"The Count of Darkness"	Redbook (June 1935)	Not part of a collection	part of planned Philippe stories
"The Intimate Strangers"	McCall's (June 1935)	The Price Was High (1979)	
"Zone of Accident"	The Saturday Evening Post (July 1935)	The Price Was High (1979)	
"Fate in Her Hands" aka "What You Don't Know"	American Magazine (April 1936)	The Price Was High (1979)	
"Image on the Heart"	McCall's (April 1936)	The Price Was High (1979)	
"Too Cute for Words"	The Saturday Evening Post (April 1936)	The Price Was High (1979)	part of planned Gwen stories
"Three Acts of Music"	Esquire (May 1936)	The Price Was High (1979)	
"Inside the House"	The Saturday Evening Post (June 1936)	The Price Was High (1979)	part of planned Gwen stories
"An Author's Mother"	Esquire (Sep 1936)	The Price Was High (1979)	
"'Trouble'"	The Saturday Evening Post (March 1937)	The Price Was High (1979)	part of planned Trouble stories
"The Guest in Room Nineteen"	Esquire (Oct 1937)	The Price Was High (1979)	
"In the Holidays"	Esquire (Dec 1937)	The Price Was High (1979)	
"The End of Hate"	Collier’s (June 22, 1940)	The Price Was High (1979)	
"The Kingdom in the Dark"	Redbook (Aug 1935)	Not part of a collection	part of planned Philippe stories
"The Ants at Princeton"	Esquire (June 1, 1936)	Not part of a collection	Read
"Author's House"	Esquire (July 1936)	Afternoon of an Author (1958)	
"Afternoon of an Author"	Esquire (Aug 1936)	Afternoon of an Author (1958)	Read
"I Didn't Get Over"	Esquire (Oct 1936)	Afternoon of an Author (1958)	Read
"Design in Plaster"	Esquire (Nov 1939)	Afternoon of an Author (1958)	Read
"An Alcoholic Case"	Esquire (Feb 1937)	The Stories of F. Scott Fitzgerald (1951)	Read
"The Long Way Out"	Esquire (Sep 1937)	The Stories of F. Scott Fitzgerald (1951)	Read
"Financing Finnegan"	Esquire (Jan 1938)	The Stories of F. Scott Fitzgerald (1951)	Read
"The Lost Decade"	Esquire (Dec 1939)	The Stories of F. Scott Fitzgerald (1951)	Read
"Strange Sanctuary"	Liberty (Dec 1939)	Not part of a collection	written in 1936 as "Make Yourself at Home". part of planned Gwen stories. Read
"Pat Hobby’s Christmas Wish"	Esquire (Jan 1940)	The Pat Hobby Stories (1962)	Read
"A Man in the Way"	Esquire (Feb 1940)	The Pat Hobby Stories (1962)	Read
"‘Boil Some Water - Lots of It’"	Esquire (March 1940)	The Pat Hobby Stories (1962)	Read
"Teamed with Genius"	Esquire (April 1940)	The Pat Hobby Stories (1962)	Read
"Pat Hobby and Orson Welles"	Esquire (May 1940)	The Pat Hobby Stories (1962)	Read
"Pat Hobby’s Secret"	Esquire (June 1940)	The Pat Hobby Stories (1962)	Read
"Pat Hobby, Putative Father"	Esquire (July 1940)	The Pat Hobby Stories (1962)	Read
"The Homes of the Stars"	Esquire (Aug 1940)	The Pat Hobby Stories (1962)	Read
"Pat Hobby Does His Bit"	Esquire (Sep 1940)	The Pat Hobby Stories (1962)	Read
"Pat Hobby’s Preview"	Esquire (Oct 1940)	The Pat Hobby Stories (1962)	Read
"No Harm Trying"	Esquire (Nov 1940)	The Pat Hobby Stories (1962)	Read
"A Patriotic Short"	Esquire (Dec 1, 1940)	The Pat Hobby Stories (1962)	Read

=== Posthumously ===
Title	Publication	Collected in	E-text / Note
"Three Hours Between Planes"	Esquire (July 1, 1941)	The Stories of F. Scott Fitzgerald (1951)	Read
"News of Paris — Fifteen Years Ago"	Furioso (Winter 1947)	Afternoon of an Author (1958)	written in 1940
"On the Trail of Pat Hobby"	Esquire (Jan 1, 1941)	The Pat Hobby Stories (1962)	Read
"Fun in an Artist’s Studio"	Esquire (Feb 1, 1941)	The Pat Hobby Stories (1962)	Read
"Two Old-Timers"	Esquire (March 1, 1941)	The Pat Hobby Stories (1962)	Read
"Mightier than the Sword"	Esquire (April 1, 1941)	The Pat Hobby Stories (1962)	Read
"Pat Hobby’s College Days"	Esquire (May 1, 1941)	The Pat Hobby Stories (1962)	Read
"That Kind of Party"	The Princeton University Library Chronicle (Summer 1951)	The Basil and Josephine Stories (1973)	
"Last Kiss"	Collier's (April 16, 1949)	Bits of Paradise (1974)	written in 1940
"Dearly Beloved"	Fitzgerald / Hemingway Annual (Jan 1, 1969)	Bits of Paradise (1974)	written in 1940
"On an Ocean Wave"	Esquire (Feb 1, 1941)	The Price Was High (1979)	written as Paul Elgin
"The Woman from Twenty-One"	Esquire (June 1, 1941)	1. Birmingham, Frederic A., ed. (1953). The girls from Esquire. London: Arthur Barker.; 2. The Price Was High (1979)	
"Discard"	Harper’s Bazaar (Jan 1948)	The Price Was High (1979)	written in July 1939 as "Director's Special"
"Lo, the Poor Peacock"	Esquire (Sep 1, 1971)	The Price Was High (1979)	written in 1935; declined by Saturday Evening Post. part of planned Gwen stories.
"On Your Own"	Esquire (Jan 30, 1979)	The Price Was High (1979)	written in 1931
"Gods of Darkness"	Redbook (Nov 1941)	Not part of a collection	written in 1934, part of planned Philippe stories
"The Broadcast We Almost Heard Last September"	Furioso (Fall 1947)	Not part of a collection	
"The World’s Fair"	The Kenyon Review (Autumn 1948)	Not part of a collection	
"A Full Life"	The Princeton University Library Chronicle (Winter 1988)	Not part of a collection	
"Thank You for the Light"	The New Yorker (August 6, 2012)	I'd Die For You (2017)	written in 1936; declined by The New Yorker; Read
"The Women in the House" (1936; original version) "Temperature" (2015: short version with a new title)	The Strand Magazine (July-Sept 2015)	I'd Die For You (2017)	
"The I.O.U."	The New Yorker (March 20, 2017)	I'd Die For You (2017)	written 1920; declined by Harper's Bazaar; Read
"The Couple"	Never published	I'd Die For You (2017)	written between Apr 1920 and Oct 1922
"Nightmare" aka "Fantasy in Black"	Never published	I'd Die For You (2017)	written in 1932; parts used for Tender is the Night
"What to Do About It"	Never published	I'd Die For You (2017)	written 1933; declined by Saturday Evening Post
"Travel Together"	Never published	I'd Die For You (2017)	written in 1934
"Gracie at Sea"	Never published	I'd Die For You (2017)	written in 1934; movie treatment with Robert Spafford
"I'd Die for You" aka "The Legend of Lake Lure"	Never published	I'd Die For You (2017)	written in 1935
"The Pearl and the Fur"	Never published	I'd Die For You (2017)	written in 1935; declined by Saturday Evening Post. part of planned Gwen stories.
"Day off from Love"	Never published	I'd Die For You (2017)	written between 1935 and 1936; fragment
"Cyclone in Silent Land"	Never published	I'd Die For You (2017)	written in 1936; declined by Saturday Evening Post
"Thumbs Up"	Never published	I'd Die For You (2017)	written in 1936; early version of "The End of Hate" 1940
"Dentist Appointment"	Never published	I'd Die For You (2017)	written in 1937; another version of "The End of Hate" 1940
"Offside Play" aka "Athletic Interval"	Never published	I'd Die For You (2017)	written in 1937; declined by Saturday Evening Post
"Ballet Shoes" aka "Ballet Slippers"	Fitzgerald / Hemingway Annual (Jan 1, 1976)	I'd Die For You (2017)	written in 1936; movie treatment
"Salute to Lucy and Elsie"	Never published	I'd Die For You (2017)	written in 1939; declined by Esquire
"Love is a Pain"	Never published	I'd Die For You (2017)	written in 1939/40; screenplay
"Double Time for Pat Hobby"	The New Yorker (July 17, 2025)	Not part of a collection	written in 1940; part of Pat Hobby stories Read

== Cambridge Edition ==
Cambridge University Press published the complete works of F. Scott Fitzgerald in annotated editions.

=== The Great Gatsby ===
1. The Great Gatsby (1991) | ISBN 978-0-521-40230-9
2. Trimalchio: An Early Version of The Great Gatsby (2000) | ISBN 978-0-521-40237-8
3. The Great Gatsby: An Edition of the Manuscript (2018) | ISBN 978-1-108-42680-0
4. The Great Gatsby: A Variorum Edition (2019) | ISBN 978-0-521-76620-3

=== Other books ===
- The Love of the Last Tycoon: A Western (1993) | ISBN 978-0-521-40231-6
- This Side of Paradise (1996) 978-0-521-40234-7
- Flappers and Philosophers (1999) | ISBN 978-0-521-40236-1
- Tales of the Jazz Age (2002) | ISBN 978-0-521-40238-5
- My Lost City: Personal Essays, 1920–1940 (2005) | ISBN 978-0-521-40239-2
- All The Sad Young Men (2007) | ISBN 978-0-521-40240-8
- The Beautiful and Damned (2008) | ISBN 978-0-521-88366-5
- The Lost Decade: Short Stories from Esquire, 1936–1941 (2008) | ISBN 978-0-521-88530-0
- The Basil, Josephine, and Gwen Stories (2009) | ISBN 978-0-521-76973-0
- Spires and Gargoyles: Early Writings, 1909–1919 (2010) | ISBN 978-0-521-76592-3
- Tender Is the Night (2012) | ISBN 978-0-521-40232-3
- Taps at Reveille (2014) | ISBN 978-0-521-76603-6
- A Change of Class (2016) | ISBN 978-0-521-40235-4
- Last Kiss (2017) | ISBN 978-0-521-76613-5

== Adaptations ==
Film

- 1922: The Beautiful and Damned, with Marie Prevost and Kenneth Harlan. The silent film is considered as lost.
- 1926: The Great Gatsby, with Warner Baxter, Lois Wilson, Neil Hamilton, Hale Hamilton, William Powell, Georgia Hale, and Carmelita Geraghty. The silent film is considered as lost.
- 1949: The Great Gatsby, with Alan Ladd, Betty Field, Macdonald Carey, Barry Sullivan, Howard Da Silva, Shelley Winters, and Ruth Hussey.
- 1962: Tender Is the Night, with Jennifer Jones, Jason Robards, Jr., Joan Fontaine, and Tom Ewell. The film was nominated for an Academy Awards.
- 1974: The Great Gatsby, with Robert Redford, Mia Farrow, Sam Waterston, Bruce Dern, Scott Wilson, Karen Black, and Lois Chiles. The film won two Academy Awards.
- 1976: The Last Tycoon, with Robert de Niro, Tony Curtis, Robert Mitchum, Jack Nicholson, Donald Pleasence, Jeanne Moreau, Theresa Russell, and Ingrid Boulting. The film was nominated for an Academy Award for Best Art Direction.
- 2008: The Curious Case of Benjamin Button, with Brad Pitt, Cate Blanchett, Taraji P. Henson, Mahershala Ali, and Tilda Swinton. The film received thirteen Academy Award nominations, the most of the 81st Academy Awards, including for Best Picture. It won three Academy Award.
- 2013: The Great Gatsby, with Leonardo DiCaprio, Carey Mulligan, Tobey Maguire, Joel Edgerton, Jason Clarke, Isla Fisher, Elizabeth Debicki, and Amitabh Bachchan. The film won two Academy Awards.

Television

- 1955: The Diamond as Big as the Ritz, a television film, broadcast on Kraft Theatre, with Lee Remick and Elizabeth Montgomery.
- 1957: The Last Tycoon, an episode of the anthology series Playhouse 90, with Peter Strauss, Mary Steenburgen, and Sean Young.
- 1985: Tender Is the Night, a television series, with Mary Steenburgen and Peter Strauss.
- 2000: The Great Gatsby, a television film, broadcast on the BBC, with Toby Stephens, Mira Sorvino, Paul Rudd, Martin Donovan, Bill Camp, Heather Goldenhersh, and Francie Swift.
- 2016–2017: The Last Tycoon, a television series, with Matt Bomer, Kelsey Grammer, Lily Collins, Dominique McElligott, Enzo Cilenti, Koen De Bouw, Mark O'Brien, and Rosemarie DeWitt. The series was nominated for three Primetime Emmy Awards.

Opera

- 1999: The Great Gatsby, composed by John Harbison.

=== Lost manuscripts ===
In 2004, the University of South Carolina purchased a newly discovered cache of 2,000 pages of screenplay work that Fitzgerald wrote for MGM while in Hollywood. The cache demonstrates that Fitzgerald put considerable effort into his attempts at screenwriting during his final years. He approached each screenplay assignment by MGM as if it were a novel, and he wrote extensive back-stories for every character before typing a single word of dialogue. Despite these herculean efforts, the studio nonetheless found his work unsatisfactory and chose not to renew his contract.

In 2015, The Strand Magazine published an 8,000-word lost manuscript by Fitzgerald entitled "Temperature", dated July 1939. Long thought lost, the manuscript was found by a researcher in Princeton's archives. The story recounts the illness and decline of an alcoholic writer among Hollywood idols in Los Angeles while suffering lingering fevers and indulging in light-hearted romance with a Hollywood actress. Two years later, Scribner's published a rediscovered cache of Fitzgerald's short stories in a collection titled I'd Die For You.

In 2018, a new story featuring Pat Hobby was found in the Fitzgerald Papers at Princeton University by Anne Margaret Daniel. This typescript was untitled and undated, but it presumably was written in the summer of 1940; it was published in 2025 in The New Yorker with the title "Double Time For Pat Hobby".

== Works cited ==
- Begley, Sarah (July 31, 2015), "Newly Discovered F. Scott Fitzgerald Story Published", Time, New York City
- McAlpin, Heller (April 30, 2017), "'I'd Die For You' Gives A Glimpse Into F. Scott Fitzgerald's Writing Life", NPR, Washington, D.C.: National Public Radio
- McGrath, Charles (April 22, 2004), "Fitzgerald as Screenwriter: No Hollywood Ending", The New York Times, New York City
- Miller, Laura (August 4, 2015), "Fitzgerald the Pro: A lost short story reminds us that even at the end of his life, F. Scott Fitzgerald could craft a tale", Slate, Washington, D.C.
