= The Short Stories of F. Scott Fitzgerald =

Compilation of short stories

The Short Stories of F. Scott Fitzgerald is a compilation of 43 short stories by F. Scott Fitzgerald. It was edited by Matthew J. Bruccoli and published by Charles Scribner's Sons in 1989. It begins with a foreword by Charles Scribner II and a preface written by Bruccoli, after which the stories follow in chronological order of publication.

== List of stories included ==
- Head and Shoulders (Feb. 1920)
- Bernice Bobs Her Hair (May 1920)
- The Ice Palace (May 1920)
- The Offshore Pirate (May 1920)
- May Day (July 1920)
- The Jelly-Bean (Oct. 1920)
- The Curious Case of Benjamin Button (May 1922)
- The Diamond as Big as the Ritz (June 1922)
- Winter Dreams (Dec. 1922)
- Dice, Brassknuckles, & Guitar (May 1923)
- Absolution (June 1924)
- Rags Martin-Jones and the Pr-nce of W-les (July 1924)
- The Sensible Thing (July 1924)
- Love in the Night (Mar. 1925)
- The Rich Boy (Feb 1926)
- Jacob's Ladder (Aug. 1927)
- A Short Trip Home (Dec. 1927)
- The Bowl (Jan. 1928)
- The Captured Shadow (Dec 1928)
- Basil and Cleopatra (Apr. 1929)
- The Last of the Belles (Mar. 1929)
- Majesty (July 1929)
- At Your Age (Aug. 1929)
- The Swimmers (Oct. 1929)
- Two Wrongs (Jan. 1930)
- First Blood (Apr. 1930)
- Emotional Bankruptcy (Aug. 1931)
- The Bridal Party (Aug. 1930)
- One Trip Abroad (Oct. 1930)
- The Hotel Child (Jan. 1931)
- Babylon Revisited (Feb. 1931)
- A New Leaf (short story) (July 1931)
- A Freeze-Out (Dec. 1931)
- Six of One- (Feb. 1932)
- What a Handsome Pair! (Aug. 1932)
- Crazy Sunday (Oct. 1932)
- More Than Just a House (June 1933)
- Afternoon of an Author (Aug. 1936)
- Financing Finnegan (Jan. 1938)
- The Lost Decade (Dec. 1939)
- "Boil Some Water- Lots of It" (March 1940)
- Last Kiss (Apr. 1949)
- Dearly Beloved (1969)

== Additional short stories not in this collection include ==
- Gretchen's Forty Winks (March 1924)
- Offside Play aka Athletic Interval (1937; unpublished)
- Gods of Darkness
