= The Price Was High =

1979 story collection by F. Scott Fitzgerald

The Price Was High: Fifty Uncollected Stories by F. Scott Fitzgerald
- First edition
- Author: F. Scott Fitzgerald
- Language: English
- Genre: Short stories
- Publisher: Harcourt Brace Jovanovich
- Publication date: 1979
- Publication place: United States
- Media type: Print (hardback)
- Pages: 808
- ISBN: 978-0704322332

The Price Was High: Fifty Uncollected Stories by F. Scott Fitzgerald is a volume of short fiction by F. Scott Fitzgerald published by Harcourt Brace & Company in 1979.

The volume comprises stories originally appearing in popular literary journals, but never authorized for collection by Fitzgerald during his lifetime.

== Stories ==
The stories in the collection are presented here chronologically by the date they were first published.

- "The Smilers" (The Smart Set, June 1920)
- "Myra Meets His Family" (The Saturday Evening Post, March 20, 1920)
- "Two For a Cent" (Metropolitan Magazine, April 1922)
- "Dice, Brassknuckles & Guitar" (Hearst’s International Magazine, May 1923)
- "Diamond Dick and the First Law of Women" (Hearst’s International Magazine, April 1924)
- "The Third Casket" (The Saturday Evening Post, May 31, 1924)
- "The Pusher-in-the-Face" (Woman’s Home Companion, February 1925)
- "One of My Oldest Friends" (Woman’s Home Companion, September 1925)
- "The Unspeakable Egg" (The Saturday Evening Post, July 12, 1924)
- "John Jackson’s Arcady" (The Saturday Evening Post, July 26, 1924)
- "Not in the Guidebook" (Woman’s Home Companion, November 1925)
- "Presumption" (The Saturday Evening Post, January 9, 1926)
- "Adolescent Marriage" (The Saturday Evening Post, March 6, 1926)
- "Your Way and Mine" (Woman’s Home Companion, May 1927)
- "The Love Boat" (The Saturday Evening Post, October 8, 1927)
- "The Bowl" (The Saturday Evening Post, January 21, 1928)
- "At Your Age" (The Saturday Evening Post, August 17, 1929)
- "Indecision" (The Saturday Evening Post, May 16, 1931)
- "Flight and Pursuit" (The Saturday Evening Post, May 14, 1932)
- "On Your Own" (Unpublished, spring 1931)
- "Between Three and Four" (The Saturday Evening Post, September 15, 1931)
- "A Change of Class" (The Saturday Evening Post, September 26, 1931)
- "Six of One—" (Redbook, February 1932)
- "A Freeze Out" (The Saturday Evening Post, December 19, 1931)
- "Diagnosis" (The Saturday Evening Post, February 20, 1932)
- "The Rubber Check" (The Saturday Evening Post, August 6, 1932)
- "On Schedule" (The Saturday Evening Post, March 18, 1933)
- "More Than Just a House" (The Saturday Evening Post, June 24, 1933)
- "I Got Shoes" (The Saturday Evening Post, September 23, 1933)
- "The Family Bus" (The Saturday Evening Post, November 4, 1933)
- "In the Darkest Hour" (Redbook, October 1935)
- "No Flowers" (The Saturday Evening Post, July 21, 1934)
- "New Types" (The Saturday Evening Post, September 22, 1934)
- "The Last Case" (The Saturday Evening Post, November 3, 1934)
- "Lo, the Poor Peacock!" (Esquire, September 1971)
- "The Intimate Strangers" (McCall’s, June 1935)
- "Zone of Accident" (The Saturday Evening Post, July 13, 1935)
- "Fate in His Hands" (The American Magazine, April 1936)
- "Image on the Heart" (McCall’s, April 1936)
- "Too Cute for Words" (The Saturday Evening Post, April 18, 1936)
- "Inside the House" (The Saturday Evening Post, June 13, 1936)
- "Three Acts of Music" (Esquire, May 1936)
- "‘Trouble’" (The Saturday Evening Post, March 6, 1937)
- "An Author’s Mother" (Esquire, September 1936)
- "In the Holidays" (Esquire, December 1937)
- "The Guest in Room Nineteen" (Esquire, October 1937)
- "The End of Hate" (Collier's, June 22, 1940)
- "On an Ocean Wave by Paul Elgin" (Esquire, February 1941)
- "The Woman From Twenty-One" (Esquire, June 1941)
- "Discard [Director’s Special]" (Harper’s Bazaar, January 1948)

== Background ==
“I have asked a lot of my emotions—one hundred and twenty stories. The price was high, right up with Kipling, because there was one little drop of something not blood, not a tear, not my seed, but me more intimately than these, in every story, it was the extra I had. Now it is gone and I am just like you now.” — “Our April Letter” from The Notebooks of F. Scott Fitzgerald (1978)

During Fitzgerald’s professional career he sold 164 of his stories to popular literary journals of the 1920s and 30s, the so-called "slicks." Forty-six of these stories were collected in four volumes: Flappers and Philosophers (1920), Tales of the Jazz Age (1922), All the Sad Young Men (1926), and Taps at Reveille (1935).

After Fitzgerald’s death in 1940, six more volumes of as yet uncollected short fiction appeared: The Stories of F. Scott Fitzgerald (1951), Afternoon of an Author (1957), The Pat Hobby Stories (1962), The Apprenticeship Fiction of F. Scott Fitzgerald (1965), The Basil and Josephine Stories (1973), and Bits of Paradise (1974).

The Price Was High represents a selection of 49 of the remaining 57 previously uncollected works first published in magazines. Eight stories remain uncollected at the behest of Fitzgerald’s daughter Scottie Fitzgerald Smith, deemed too undistinguished for inclusion. The volume adds a single piece, "On Your Own," one of nine stories never published so as to make The Price Was High an even fifty stories. Biographer Matthew J. Bruccoli, editor of The Price Was High, acknowledges that these stories lack the "facility" that characterize Fitzgerald's most outstanding short fiction: "The stories in this volume are not Fitzgerald’s best."

== Reception ==
Kirkus Reviews questions the judgment of editor Matthew J. Bruccoli in publishing works that Fitzgerald declined to collect in his own lifetime: "[N]ot a single one of these stories takes the time to stand back and really achieve the pause, gravity, and sweetness of Fitzgerald's best work."

Literary critic Aaron Latham of The Washington Post considers the stories in The Price Was High to be "bootleg" magazine fiction: "The best of Fitzgerald’s magazine work, of course, had been published from long ago." Latham argues that Fitzgerald would have benefited from writing less short fiction and finishing The Last Tycoon (1941), which remained uncompleted when he died in 1940.

Literary critic Malcolm Cowley in The New York Times, after reading all 50 stories, found merit in a number of them, writing: "almost all of them contain something to surprise us, if only a sentence or a passing observation…" Cowley adds this caveat:

The sad fact remains that three-fourths of the stories in "The Price Was High" are below his usual level of achievement. In general they depend too much on coincidence, melodramatic turns of plot and information withheld from the reader until the last moment so as to end the story with an O. Henry twist.

== Critical appraisal ==
Fitzgerald approached his short stories as a means of financing his primary creative endeavor: to write novels. As his short fiction was "written for money", he often despaired at his commercial relationship with The Saturday Evening Post and other "slick" journals. Writing to editor H. L. Menken in 1925, he complained that "my trash for the Post grows worse and worse as there is less and less heart in it...People don’t seem to realize that to an intelligent man writing down is about the hardest thing in the world."

In a 1929 note to fellow writer Ernest Hemingway, Fitzgerald identified himself with a sexual prostitute: "The Post now pays the old whore $4000 a screw. But now it’s because she’s mastered the 40 positions—in her youth, one was enough."

Bruccoli notes that despite Fitzgerald’s doubts as to the value of much of his short fiction, "he expended a major part of his talent on them".

Matthew J. Bruccoli, who edited the collection, reminds readers that Fitzgerald was fastidious about the work that was included in his collections and argues that the fact that the material in The Price Was High only appeared posthumously is a measure of his discrimination. Bruccoli writes: "Fitzgerald maintained a distinction between magazine and book publication, insisting that inclusion of a story in one of his collections gave it permanence and literary standing.} Bruccoli reminds readers that, during the Roaring Twenties, Fitzgerald was widely regarded as "a radical writer who announced the existence of new social values and new sexual roles." With respect to women during the era of the Flapper, Bruccoli writes:

Fitzgerald’s girls are not dumb dolls. At their best they are courageous and self-reliant, determined to make the best of their assets in a man’s world. They are frankly sensual, though chaste—warm and promising. At an extreme there are man-eating women who dominate or destroy men, though this condition is unusual in his short stories.

That Fitzgerald was fully aware of the cultural prohibitions concerning popular literature in the United States, and as a social conservation, was not unduly thwarted by these strictures. As to whether he "compromised or diluted his stories" to make them suitable for publication, this "remains an open question" according to Bruccoli.

== Sources ==
- Bruccoli, Matthew J. 1979. Introductions to the stories in The Price Was High: Fifty Uncollected Stories by F. Scott Fitzgerald. MJF Books, New York. ISBN 1-56731-106-7
- Bruccoli, Matthew J. 1998. Preface to The Short Stories of F. Scott Fitzgerald. Simon & Schuster, Scribner Classics Edition. Matthew J. Bruccoli, editor. ISBN 0-684-84250-5
- Cowley, Malcom. 1979. "A Book of Last Things" The New York Times, March 4, 1979. A Book of Last Things Retrieved 19 January 2024.
- Kirkus Reviews. 1978. THE PRICE WAS HIGH: The Last Uncollected Stories of F. Scott Fitzgerald. Kirkus Reviews. Book Reviews, Sites, Romance, Fantasy, Fiction Retrieved 19 January 2024.
- Latham, Aaron. 1979. "Slick Fiction From F. Scott Fitzgerald" The Washington Post, February 11, 1979. https://www.washingtonpost.com/archive/entertainment/books/1979/02/11/slick-fiction-from-f-scott-fitzgerald/32a291b1-c066-40c6-a629-e94019416a47/ Retrieved 19 January 2024.
