= The Adjuster (short story) =

1926 short story by F. Scott Fitzgerald

- Short story by F. Scott Fitzgerald
- Country: United States
- Language: English
- Genre: Short story

Publication
- Publication date: February 1926

"The Adjuster" is a short story written by American author F. Scott Fitzgerald. The story appears in Fitzgerald's third collection of short stories All the Sad Young Men, published by Scribners in February 1926. The story depicts the troubled relationship of married couple Luella and Charles Hemple, living in New York City in 1925.

== Background ==
"The Adjuster" is the sixth story in the collection. All the Sad Young Men was published a year after his third and most celebrated novel, The Great Gatsby, and contains 9 stories.

Fitzgerald wrote "The Adjuster" writing at the height of his career but also during a time of disillusionment. He was in financial difficulty, his wife Zelda Fitzgerald was sick, and he believed she was romantically involved with another man. His play The Vegetable had been a failure.

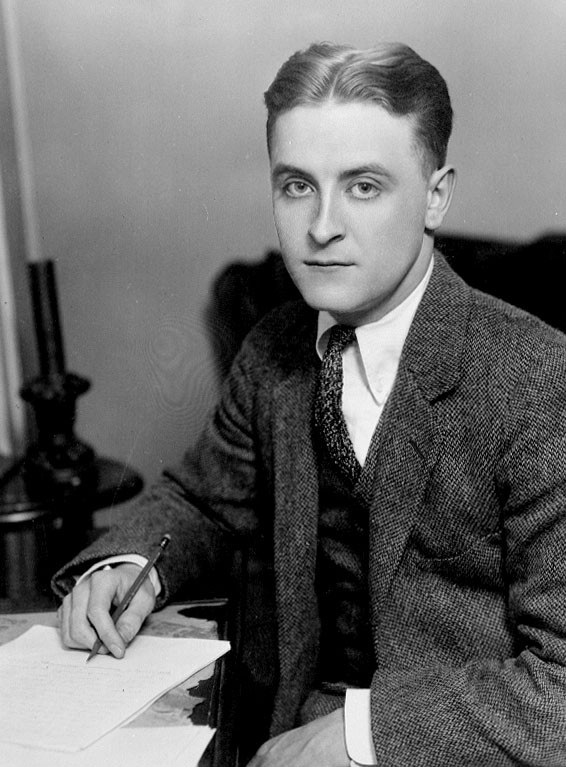

One author states that All the Sad Young Men contained some of his most profound, if not most widely known, short stories, stating that "'The Adjuster' looks at the ramifications of a woman's decision to marry for money and what happens when her husband and child fall ill, and she has to assume responsibility she never imagined."

== Reception ==
Many of the stories praised in Fitzgerald's lifetime for their artistic brilliance have shown to be more carefully conceived and artfully crafted than they had been thought by Fitzgerald's contemporaries to be. Alice Petry highlights layers of complexity in "The Adjuster", which she describes as well known, but less often examined.

Under the headline "Stories by Scott Fitzgerald, Some Good, Others Please Remit", the reviewer of All The Sad Young Men on 13 March 1926 approved of three of them, including "The Adjuster".

== Critical analysis ==
"The Adjuster" centers around themes of dissatisfaction and disillusionment, the difficulties of marriage, and the weight of psychological and emotional pressure. "The Adjuster" portrays Charles and Luella Hemple, a couple living in New York City in 1920.

"They were of that enormous American class who wander over Europe every summer, sneering rather pathetically and wistfully at the customs and traditions and pastimes of other countries, because they have no customs or tradition or pastimes of their own. It is a class sprung yesterday from fathers and mothers who might just as well have lived two hundred years ago."

These ideas, mirroring Fitzgerald's disillusionment with the American Dream – life, liberty and the pursuit of happiness – in the context of the hedonistic Jazz Age, are exhibited through "The Adjuster" and synonymous with Fitzgerald's entire works.

According to Ronald Berman, "Fitzgerald's protagonists are judged by contemporary psychological standards… If we look at Fitzgerald's protagonists in the 1920s, it is fairly plain that they are intensely self-conscious. They try to explain themselves to themselves – and also, without much success, to others. They try to remake themselves." Luella Hample, as the protagonist of "The Adjuster", embodies Fitzgerald's exploration of psychoanalytical and behavioral tendencies.

"She paused, brooding. 'I'm so sorry for him I don’t know what to do, Ede—but if we sat home, I'd just be sorry for myself. And to tell you another true thing, I'd rather that he'd be unhappy than me…Luella was not so much stating a case as thinking aloud. She considered that she was being very fair."

Stories from this collection, including "The Adjuster", explore themes of the decadent lifestyle of the Jazz Age, as well as the anxieties and difficulties of relationships and post-war depression. "The Adjuster" portrays themes of disenchantment, responsibility, fulfillment within relationships and marriage, and is analogous to Fitzgerald's relationship with his wife, Zelda.
