= The Cut-Glass Bowl =

1920 short story by F. Scott Fitzgerald

- Short story by F. Scott Fitzgerald
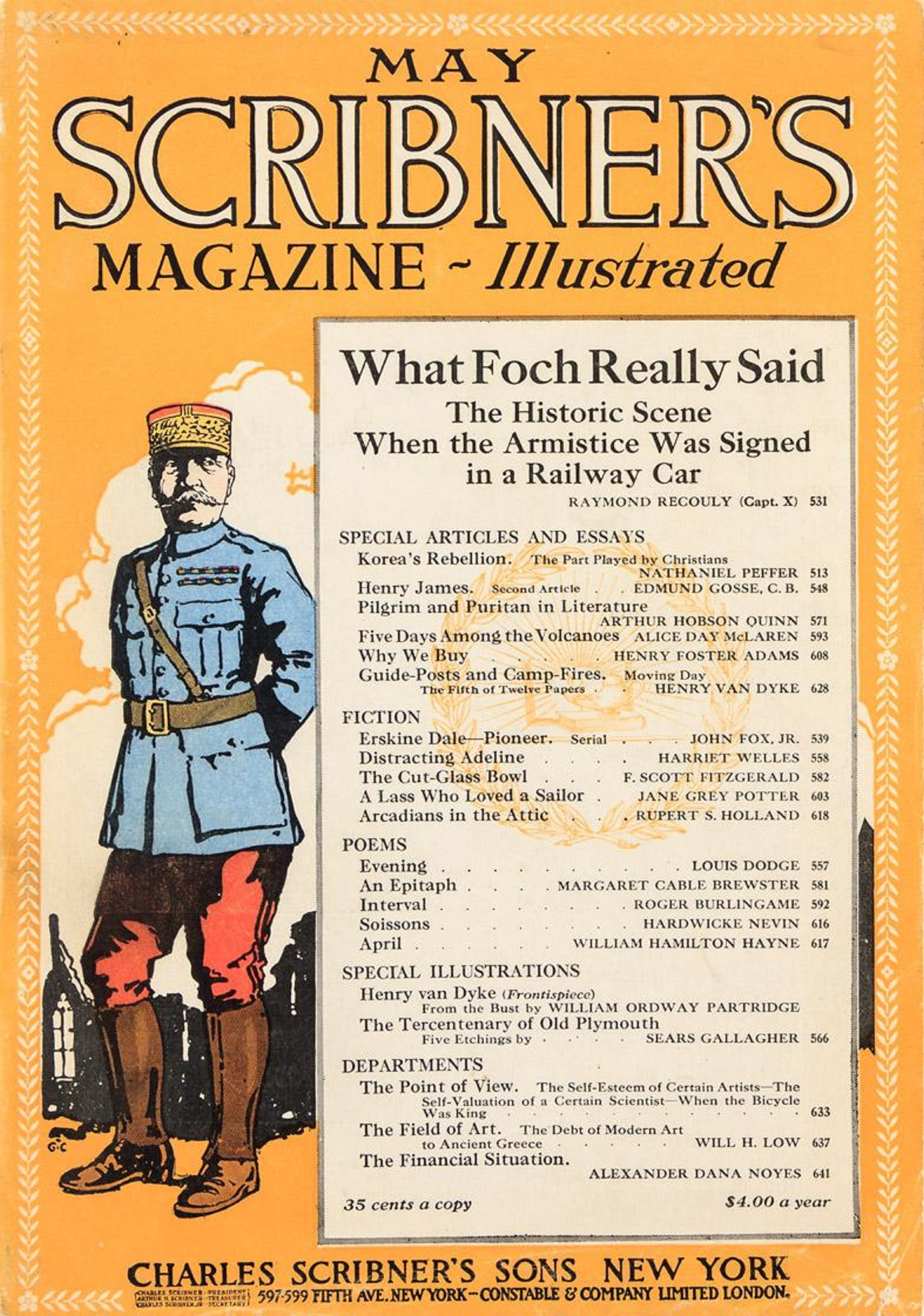
- The story was first published in the May 1920 issue of Scribner's Magazine

Text available at Wikisource
- Country: United States
- Language: English
- Genre: Short story

Publication
- Published in: Scribner's Magazine
- Publication type: Periodical
- Publisher: Charles Scribner's Sons
- Media type: Print (Magazine, Hardback & Paperback)
- Publication date: May 1, 1920

"The Cut-Glass Bowl" is a short story by American author F. Scott Fitzgerald, first published in the May 1920 issue of Scribner's Magazine, and included later that year in his first short story collection Flappers and Philosophers. The story follows the lives of a married couple, Evylyn and Harold Piper, through difficult or tragic events that involve a cut glass bowl they received as a wedding gift. In a copy of Flappers and Philosophers given to literary critic H. L. Mencken, Fitzgerald wrote that he deemed the story "worth reading" in contrast to others in the volume which he dismissed as either "amusing" or "trash."

== Plot summary ==
Mrs. Roger Fairboalt, an elderly gossip, visits the younger Evylyn Piper at her home. The older woman is a snoop who is curious about Mrs. Piper and her rumored affair with Freddy Gedney. They discuss the furnishings in the house, including the china. Mrs. Fairboalt focuses on a large cut-glass bowl. Evelyn explains that it was a wedding gift from a friend, someone she saw socially before she married. When he gave it to her, he exclaimed: "Evylyn, I'm going to give a present that's as hard as you are and as beautiful and as empty and as easy to see through."

After Mrs. Fairboalt's departure, Freddy Gedney surreptitiously approaches the house, and Evylyn informs him that she is ending their extramarital affair. Her husband Harold Piper arrives home early. She conceals Freddy, but he hits the cut-glass bowl, revealing his presence to Harold. Following the discovery of Evylyn's adultery, the marriage becomes strained, and Evylyn focuses on raising their two children. She begins to noticeably age.

On Evylyn's thirty-fifth birthday, her alcoholic husband Harold calls and tells her they are having guests for dinner—a business dinner with a potential partner and his wife to discuss a merger of their companies. Harold insists on using the cut-glass bowl for the punch. Harold becomes inebriated at dinner, and Evylyn's daughter cuts her hand on the bowl and develops blood poisoning. Her hand is amputated.

After this incident, Evylyn receives a letter with news of her son's death in World War I, which the maid has placed in the bowl. She reads the letter while seated next to the bowl. In grief and despair, she takes the bowl outside the house to destroy it, but as she descends the stairs, she falls, and the bowl shatters into pieces. The reader is left to assume that she is killed in the fall.

== List of characters ==
- Evylyn Piper – A beautiful young housewife in the early 1900s.
- Harold Piper – Evylyn's husband, a prosperous wholesale hardware house owner.
- Freddy Gedney – Evylyn's love affair.
- Donald and Julie – Children of Evylyn and Harold.
- Milton Piper – Harold's younger brother and partner.
- Jessie Lowrie – Harold's first cousin (née Jessie Piper).
- Tom Lowrie – Jessie's husband.
- Irene Piper – Harold's unmarried sister.
- Joe Ambler – "A confirmed bachelor and Irene's perennial beau".
- Mrs Roger Fairboalt – Old friend of Evylyn.
- Carleton Canby – Old friend of Evylyn, the one who gives her the cut-glass bowl, back in 1890s.
- Clarence Ahearn – A potential partner of Harold and Milton in the hardware business.
- Mrs Ahearn – Clarence's wife.
- Hilda and Martha – Maids.
- Dr Martin and Dr Foulke – Physicians.
- Bijou – Evylyn's pony when a young girl.

== Critical analysis ==
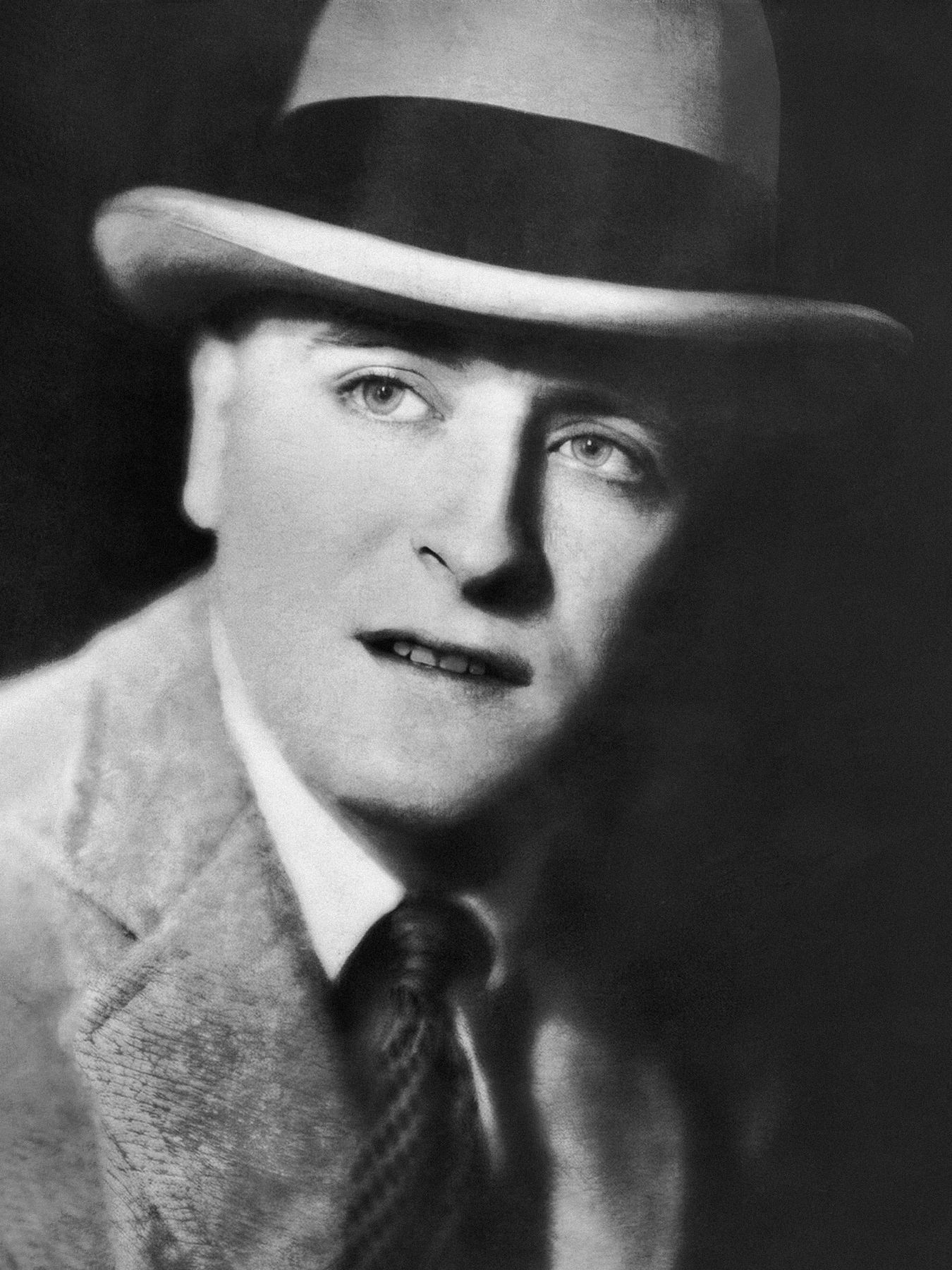
F. Scott Fitzgerald

Fitzgerald wrote the story in October 1919. Although ostensibly an analysis of the role played by an enormous glass punch bowl in the destruction of the life of Evylyn Piper, much of the short story traces the deterioration of Evylyn's marriage to a prosperous hardware dealer whose business declines over several years.

According to literary critic John Kuehl, the cut-glass bowl of the title symbolizes the fate of protagonist Mrs. Evylyn "Evie" Piper. Unfolding sequentially in the chronology of Evylyn's life, the immense cut-glass bowl inflicts its curse upon her four times, culminating in her demise.

The bowl enters her life when presented as a wedding gift by a jilted suitor, accompanied by an ominous remark characterizing the decorative item: "[A]s hard as you are and as beautiful and as empty and as easy to see through." The bowl is instrumental in exposing Evie's affair with a local man early in her marriage when she still possessed her youthful good looks. As she approaches middle age, the bowl is at the center of a drunken quarrel between her husband and a prospective business partner, threatening their middle-class lifestyle.

When Evie's youngest child Julie accidentally cuts her hand on the glass bowl, the child's wound becomes seriously infected, requiring amputation. Evie is notified that her son has been killed serving overseas during World War I: she discovers the telegram in the cut-glass bowl. Finally recognizing the malignant nature of the glass object, she attempts to smash it and dies in the attempt.

In the climax of the story, the cut-glass bowl is personified, and as such delivers its verdict just before destroying the protagonist:

You see, I am fate…and stronger than your puny plans; and I am how-things-turn-out and I am different from your little dreams, and I am the flight of time and the end of beauty and unfulfilled desire.

The second and final Fitzgerald story featured in Scribner's Magazine, Matthew J. Bruccoli and Judith S. Baughman note that "this moralizing tale appealed to the taste of Robert Bridges, editor of that magazine."
