= The Baby Party =

Short story by F. Scott Fitzgerald

- Short story by F. Scott Fitzgerald
- Country: United States
- Language: English
- Genre: Short story

Publication
- Publication date: February 1925

"The Baby Party" is a short story published by F. Scott Fitzgerald in Hearst's International Cosmopolitan in February 1925.

== Plot ==
The story centers on a young couple, John and Edith Andros. They are the parents of Ede, their two-and-half-year-old daughter. Although the prospect of having a child to continue his name and livelihood appeals to the father, the day-to-day realities soon irritate him. Early on it is apparent this creates discord among the couple.

The daughter is invited to a baby party next door. John looks forward to attending after work, thinking that so many babies and mothers together would be entertaining. After Ede injures one of the other children, he ends up in a fistfight with another father. At the close of the story, he insists his wife apologize for the mess, and he holds his daughter while she falls asleep in his arms.

In the story the children have characteristics of adults while the adults act like children.

== Background ==
"The Baby Party" was written while Fitzgerald was in his infamous period of financial hardship. He was completing the final proof stage for The Great Gatsby and needed to support himself financially. It was later collected in All the Sad Young Men.
