= The Freshest Boy =

Short story by F. Scott Fitzgerald

- Short story by F. Scott Fitzgerald
- Country: United States
- Language: English
- Genre: Short story

Publication
- Published in: The Saturday Evening Post collected in Taps at Reveille
- Publication type: Magazine; Short story collection
- Publisher: Scribner (book)
- Media type: Print
- Publication date: July 28, 1928
- Series: The Basil and Josephine Stories

"The Freshest Boy" is a short story by American writer F. Scott Fitzgerald. It was first published in the July 28, 1928 issue of The Saturday Evening Post, and was reprinted in Fitzgerald's 1935 collection, Taps at Reveille.

== Plot ==
The story centers around a boy and his discouragement while attending a preparatory school. The boy, Basil Duke Lee, is characterized as naive and dreamy. As a result, he is treated as an outcast among his peers and by the school's administrators.

Lee's naivete is contrasted with the experienced perspective of an upperclassman, Lewis Crum. Crum resents Lee's carefree nature and his lack of commitment to tradition. The two boys develop a competitive relationship, and it becomes clear that Lee is internally adjusted to the environment while outwardly aloof and unhappy. Unlike Lee, however, Crum comes from wealth, which gives him a palpable advantage at the school.

The school's headmaster castigates Lee for his low grades. As the story progresses, it becomes evident that Lee's family is not wealthy; he is one of the "poorest boys in a rich school." This causes him obvious shame, and the story's focus shifts to his hopes for an off–campus excursion to New York City. Instead, he ventures out to a suburb and interacts with a boy who seems to have some type of emotional disability.

Escaping the stifling atmosphere of the school, Lee finally goes to New York City and has lunch at the Manhattan Hotel; while there, he reads a letter from his mother. The theme of homesickness is evident throughout the work. The letter informs Lee that he will be going abroad and will therefore no longer attend the school. Initially, he is elated by the news.

The last section of the story takes place within the theater as Lee's thoughts turn to his future. He feels that, like actors following the course of a play, he has a destiny. Although he seeks to escape the preparatory school's turgid atmosphere, he also believes he must fulfill his fate, including college. After the play, the school official who accompanies him becomes intoxicated and falls asleep. When he returns to the school, Lee is called a nickname, but he is not ashamed or mortified by the prospect of being an outcast any longer. He realizes he is accepted, to the point that it serves his needs, and falls asleep satisfied.

== History ==
Fitzgerald wrote the story when he was arguably at the height of his creative powers. It is part of The Basil and Josephine Stories, and was composed during the period when he was also writing his novel Tender is the Night. Some details of Basil Duke Lee resemble Fitzgerald's own, including growing up in the Midwest. Like many of Fitzgerald's stories at the time, it was well received by readers.

== Collections ==
"The Freshest Boy" was reprinted in Fitzgerald's 1935 collection Taps at Reveille. It was also collected in The Basil and Josephine Stories, as well as Malcolm Cowley's The Stories of F. Scott Fitzgerald and in Matthew J. Bruccoli's The Short Stories of F. Scott Fitzgerald.

== Reception ==
In The New York Times' review of Taps at Reveille, critic Edith Walton wrote, "Poignant as well as amusing [is] the longer sequence of stories which deals with a pre-war boy in his middle teens. Though his method is different from Booth Tarkington's, Mr. Fitzgerald approaches at times the same startling veracity. Basil Duke Lee is a bright, sensitive, likable boy, constantly betrayed by a fatal tendency to brag and boss. He knows his failing, especially after the minor hell of his first year at boarding school, but again and again he is impelled to ruin an initial good impression. Two of the Basil stories—'He Thinks He's Wonderful', and 'The Perfect Life'—are small masterpieces of humor and perception, and Mr. Fitzgerald is always miraculously adept at describing adolescent love affairs and adolescent swagger."
