= The Rich Boy =

1926 short story by F. Scott Fitzgerald

- Short story by F. Scott Fitzgerald
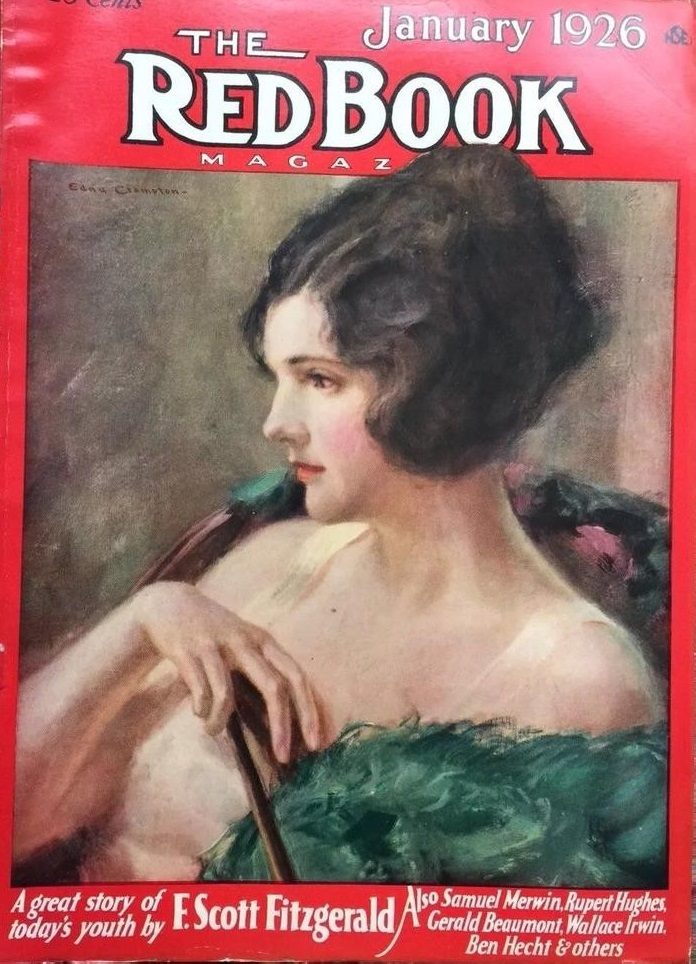
- Country: United States
- Language: English
- Genre: Short story

Publication
- Published in: Redbook Magazine; All the Sad Young Men
- Publication type: Magazine; Short Story Collection
- Publisher: Scribner (book)
- Media type: Print
- Publication date: January/February 1926

"The Rich Boy" is a short story by American writer F. Scott Fitzgerald. It was included in his 1926 collection All the Sad Young Men. "The Rich Boy" originally appeared in two parts, in the January and February 1926 issues of Redbook. In the January installment, the story is described on the front cover as: "A great story of today's youth by F. Scott Fitzgerald".

== Plot summary ==
F. Scott Fitzgerald's "The Rich Boy" is a short story about Anson Hunter, a very affluent young man. Anson was born rich and has always enjoyed a life of privilege, including being tutored by a British nanny in the hopes that her accent and manner of speaking might rub off.

== Background and composition ==
Fitzgerald wrote "The Rich Boy" in 1924, in Capri, while awaiting publication of The Great Gatsby. He revised it in his apartment at 14 Rue de Tilsitt in Paris the following spring, during what he described as a period of "1000 parties and no work." By May 28, 1925, he wrote his literary agent, Harold Ober, that the story was "at the typist." Five weeks later, he sent his editor Max Perkins a proposed list of stories for his third collection, describing "The Rich Boy": "Just finished—serious story and very good."

The Fitzgerald scholar Matthew Bruccoli describes the story as "an extension of The Great Gatsby, enlarging the examination of the effects of wealth on character." The story of Anson Hunter and his love for the "dark, serious beauty" Paula Legendre, Fitzgerald modeled the Rich Boy of his title on Princeton classmate Ludlow Fowler, who'd stood as best man at Fitzgerald's wedding.

Fitzgerald sent Fowler the story before publication and wrote that "I have written a 15,000 word story about you called 'The Rich Boy'—it is so disguised that no one except you and me and maybe two of the girls concerned would recognize, unless you give it away, but it is in large measure the story of your life, toned down here and there and simplified. Also many gaps had to come out of my imagination. It is frank, unsparing but sympathetic and I think you will like it—it is one of the best things I have ever done." Fowler requested excisions that Fitzgerald made before the story was collected in All the Sad Young Men the following year.

Fitzgerald's friend the writer Ring Lardner—dedicee of All the Sad Young Men—was such an admirer he told Fitzgerald he wished he could have expanded the story to novel length. Fitzgerald explained to Max Perkins that this "it would have been absolutely impossible for me to have stretched 'The Rich Boy' into anything bigger than a novelette."

== Critical reception ==
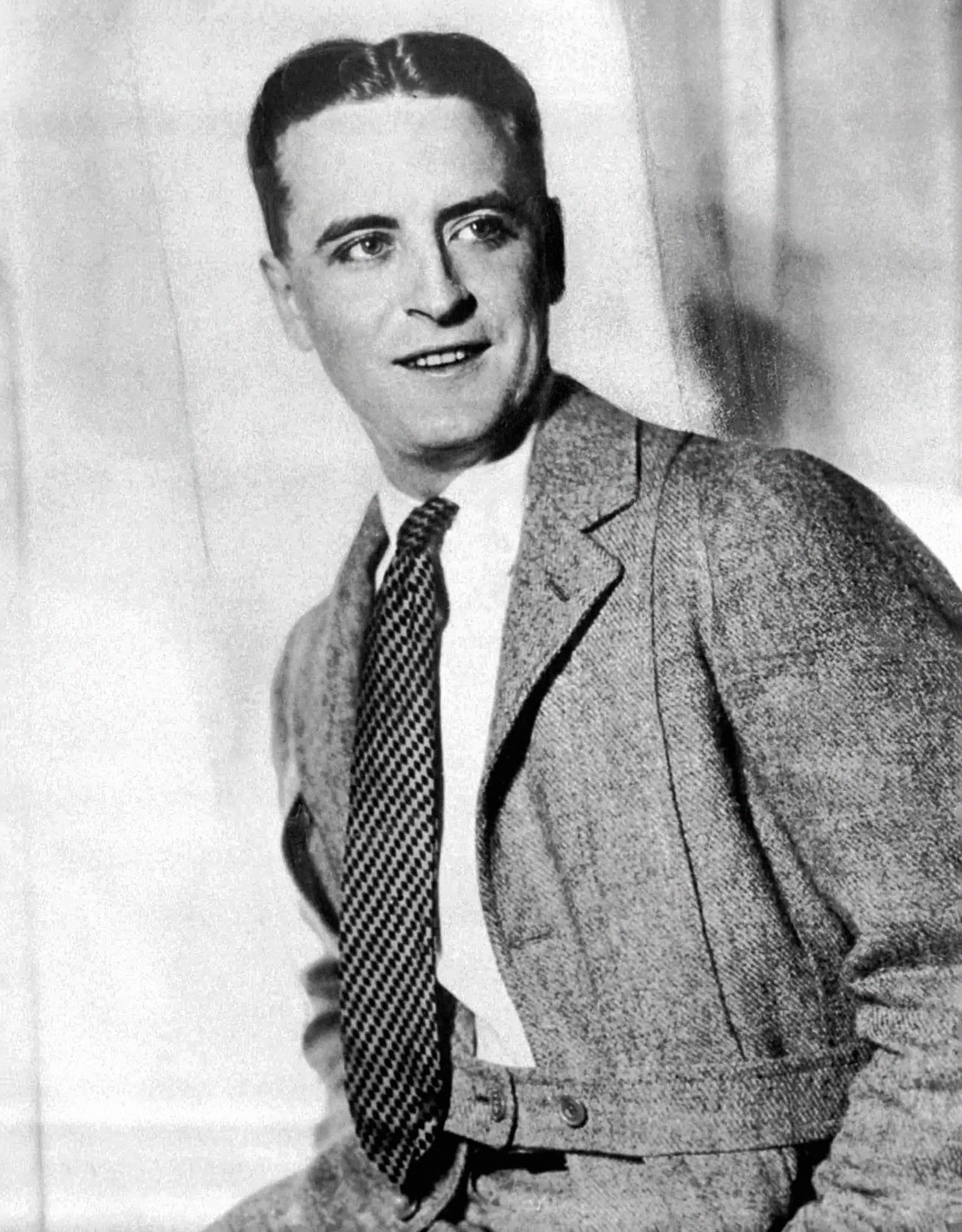
F. Scott Fitzgerald

Fitzgerald scholar Matthew J. Bruccoli hailed the short story as "Fitzgerald's most important novelette," and "one of Fitzgerald's major stories." In his biography, Bruccoli continues:

"'The Rich Boy' is a key document for understanding Fitzgerald's much-discussed and much-misunderstood attitudes toward the rich. He was not an envious admirer of the rich, who believed they possessed a special quality. In 1938 he observed: 'That was always my experience—a poor boy in a rich town; a poor boy in a rich boy's school; a poor boy in a rich man's club at Princeton...I have never been able to forgive the rich for being rich, and it has colored my entire life and works.' He knew the lives of the rich had great possibilities, but he recognized that they mostly failed to use those possibilities fully. He also perceived that money corrupts the will to excellence. Believing that work is the only dignity, he condemned the self-indulgent rich for wasting their freedom."

Bruccoli also notes the story contains Fitzgerald's "most promiscuously misquoted sentence: 'They are different from you and me.'" Fitzgerald's actual passage runs:

Let me tell you about the very rich. They are different from you and me. They possess and enjoy early, and it does something to them, makes them soft where we are hard, and cynical where we are trustful, in a way that, unless you were born rich, it is very difficult to understand. They think, deep in their hearts, that they are better than we are because we had to discover the compensations and refuges of life for ourselves.

The story's first lines are also, as Bruccoli points out, among the author's most famous:

Begin with an individual, and before you know it you find that you have created a type; begin with a type, and you find that you have created—nothing. That is because we are all queer fish, queerer behind our faces and voices than we want any one to know or than we know ourselves. When I hear a man proclaiming himself an 'average, honest, open fellow,' I feel pretty sure that he has some definite and perhaps terrible abnormality which he has agreed to conceal.
