= The Basil and Josephine Stories =

Collection of two separate short stories collections by F. Scott Fitzgerald

First edition (publ. Scribner)

The Basil and Josephine Stories is a collection of two separate short stories collections (one about Basil Duke Lee, the other about Josephine Perry) by F. Scott Fitzgerald which initially ran serially in The Saturday Evening Post. Some of them were later collected in Taps at Reveille and posthumous short story collections. The title characters were intended by Fitzgerald to meet each other, but this never happened in his literature. Basil Duke Lee, who was a fictionalized version of F. Scott Fitzgerald's younger self. Scott draws from his own experiences as a child and an adolescent.

On the hand, Josephine, was a fictional character based on real life stories of a young woman whom allegedly, Scott had been in love with in his youth.

In various correspondences Fitzgerald expressed admiration for the Lee stories, based on a young man's life in the Midwest. Josephine is a sultry character who is presented as a headstrong woman. Some critics have theorized she is based on Ginevra King, the celebrated Chicago debutante who was Fitzgerald's "first love".

== Stories ==
Basil

- "That Kind of Party" (The Princeton University Library Chronicle, Summer 1951)
- "The Scandal Detectives" (Saturday Evening Post, April 28, 1928)
- "A Night at the Fair" (Saturday Evening Post, July 21, 1928)
- "The Freshest Boy" (Saturday Evening Post, July 28, 1928)
- "He Thinks He's Wonderful" (Saturday Evening Post, September 29, 1928)
- "The Captured Shadow" (Saturday Evening Post, December 29, 1928)
- "The Perfect Life" (Saturday Evening Post, January 25, 1929)
- "Forging Ahead" (Saturday Evening Post, March 30, 1929)
- "Basil and Cleopatra" (Saturday Evening Post, April 27, 1929)

Josephine

- "First Blood" (Saturday Evening Post, April 5, 1930)
- "A Nice Quiet Place" (Saturday Evening Post, May 31, 1930)
- "A Woman with a Past" (Saturday Evening Post, September 6, 1930)
- "A Snobbish Story" (Saturday Evening Post, November 29, 1930)
- "Emotional Bankruptcy" (Saturday Evening Post, August 15, 1931)

The Basil stories detail the emotional growth of a character named Basil Lee who starts as a young man living in the Midwest and ends up, by the age of 17, ready to enter the world of Yale. Throughout the stories he is unaware of his potential until the moment he is about to lose it. Josephine Perry is described as a "Chicago Girl" whose family has a prominent role in society. This allows her to make decisions without fear of consequences. For example, when she is expelled from school she is reinstated because of her father's influence. Unlike other rebellious teenagers, such as Holden Caulfield, Josephine understands her academic problems will sort themselves out on their own.

Both characters find true love is alluring but fleeting and both stories detail the evolution of each particular character's destiny, whether they like it or not.

== History ==
Fitzgerald wrote these stories circa 1928, when he was bucking the pressure to write a sequel to The Great Gatsby. Toiling over Tender is the Night, he wrote these stories while reflecting on his youth in the Midwest. The Saturday Evening Post published the bulk of both the Basil and Josephine stories providing Fitzgerald with an ample regular paycheck. He noted that the characters typified what he called "emotional bankruptcy" and it was during this time he also wanted to claim a part of his past he once cherished, while resenting the nefarious influence of class distinctions and sell-outs in the world.
