= One Trip Abroad =

1930 short story by F. Scott Fitzgerald

- Short story by F. Scott Fitzgerald
- Country: United States
- Language: English
- Genre: Short story

Publication
- Publication date: October 11, 1930

"One Trip Abroad" is a short story by F. Scott Fitzgerald. The story first appeared in the Saturday Evening Post on October 11, 1930. Some of the story's content was later re-used by Fitzgerald in his 1934 novel Tender Is the Night.

== Plot ==
The story consists of two characters, Nelson and Nicole Kelly, two wealthy American expatriates who travel through Europe. Unlike much 1920s literature in which European residence is adventurous and cosmopolitan, the two experience both moral and physical decline in their marriage and in their bodies, symbolized by the Doppelgängers whom they encounter at the end of the short story.
