= Crazy Sunday =

1932 short story by F. Scott Fitzgerald

- Short story by F. Scott Fitzgerald
- Country: United States
- Language: English
- Genre: Short story

Publication
- Publication date: October 1932

"Crazy Sunday" is a short story by F. Scott Fitzgerald, originally published in the October 1932 issue of American Mercury.

Fitzgerald's story is set in the Hollywood of the great studios of the 1930s. The protagonist, Joel Coles, is a screenwriter. The story is under 6,400 words, but takes place over several days and locations. It is organised around a series of Sundays in Coles's life.

== Plot ==
Sketch of writer F. Scott Fitzgerald circa 1925

Screenwriter Joel Coles spends his Sundays working — at the moment he is rewriting a Eugene O'Neill play in which a famous actress is to play the lead. He is "twenty-eight and not yet broken by Hollywood" after his first six months there. But on this Sunday, he is invited to tea by the director Miles Calman: a big step up for a writer.

Stella, Calman's neglected wife, presses highballs on Joel — he had promised himself not to drink, especially as the director is loudly opposed to alcoholism — and flirts with him. He chats with the director's mother. Overjoyed by the success he is making, he offers to do his party piece, just as people are leaving. Unfortunately, it is a mocking imitation of an independent producer, Dave Silverstein. You don't mock producers in Hollywood, and the audience, including a famous actress, disassociate themselves silently from his act. "The faces surrounding him in the gently molded light were intent and curious, but there was no ghost of a smile anywhere; directly in front the Great Lover of the screen glared at him with an eye as keen as the eye of a potato." Joel realises that he has not only made a fool of himself, but been irreparably damaged among people on whom his career depends.

Next morning, he writes a horrified, crawling note of apology to Miles Calman. He slinks around the set, so furtive that a security man demands sight of his pass. His buddy Nat Keogh — the archetypal heavy drinker of Hollywood — tries to laugh him out of it, but it is not until next morning he gets a kind telegram from Stella Calman inviting him to a buffet supper that he is comforted.

"Crazy Sunday again", and Joel lunches alone on "trout, avocado salad and a pint of California wine" before dressing carefully for Mrs Calman's sister's supper. In a brief leap from the third-person-subjective mode in which he writes most of the story into third-person-omniscient, Fitzgerald writes: "Miles and Stella arrived in riding clothes — they had been quarrelling fiercely most of the afternoon on all the dirt roads back of Beverly Hills".

Only now does Fitzgerald describe the director: "Miles Calman, tall, nervous, with a desperate humor and the unhappiest eyes Joel ever saw". The problem between the couple is her discovery of an affair Miles Calman is having with an actress, Eva Goebel, his wife's best friend. Husband and wife — separately and together — confide in Joel, then the husband invites him home with them. At home they continue to squabble, using Joel as an intermediary. He realises he is falling in love with her.

Back in the studio during the week, Joel phones Miles but Stella answers; she invites him to a dinner and theatre party because her husband will be flying to a big Notre Dame game. Joel cautiously mentions the invitation to Miles, who dithers jealously then decides to take Stella himself, but on a whim invites Joel too.

"Joel could not get to the dinner. Self-conscious in his silk hat against the unemployment, he waited for the others in front of the Hollywood Theatre and watched the evening parade: obscure replicas of bright, particular picture stars, spavined men in polo coats…" Stella appears, stunning in a sparkling ice-blue dress; Miles had decided to fly to the game after all, and she's just got a telegram to say he's starting back. Afterwards — paranoid that the crazily jealous Miles might be watching her in secret — she invites Joel home. He goes, flirts with her, but is confused — "I have a strange feeling that I'm a sort of pawn in a spite game you're playing against Miles" — she continues to get emotionally blackmailing "I love you" telegrams from Miles — it is implied that Joel and Stella have sex. He is preparing to go — the phone rings with another telegram and Stella answers — the clock strikes midnight as she holds the receiver to her ear, and she falls senseless to the floor — "The telephone mouthpiece was still grinding and he put it to his ear. '—the plane fell just this side of Kansas City. The body of Miles Calman has been identified and—' He hung up the receiver."

"Joel thought of Miles, his sad and desperate face in the office two days before. In the awful silence of his death all was clear about him. He was the only American-born director with both an interesting temperament and an artistic conscience." But now, as Stella desperately tries to make Joel stay with her, he realises that he is her only link with Miles, and if he does stay, he is doomed to be a surrogate for the man she loved.

== Background ==
The short story is noteworthy because although Fitzgerald commanded respectable compensation and respect for his work, "Crazy Sunday" was turned down by nearly a dozen magazines before its eventual acceptance by American Mercury.

Fitzgerald is said to have refused all requests to revise the story as suggested, and later mandated, by editors. Thus, the story retained the original length and content, despite any risk of controversy. The story is reportedly based on Fitzgerald's own experiences at a similar party hosted by Norma Shearer and Irving Thalberg during the time Fitzgerald was working in Hollywood. Thalberg, a genius of film who was born with a congenital heart defect and died aged 37 of a heart attack, was the subject of The Last Tycoon, the novel Fitzgerald almost completed when he died. The story also illustrates Fitzgerald's attitude to alcoholism.

The story's plot may have been inspired by the March 31, 1931 inflight breakup of a Transcontinental & Western Air airliner, en route from Kansas City to Wichita, which killed Knute Rockne.
