= The Bridal Party =

Short story by F. Scott Fitzgerald

- Short story by F. Scott Fitzgerald
- Country: United States
- Language: English language

Publication
- Published in: Saturday Evening Post
- Publication type: newspaper
- Publication date: 1930

The Bridal Party is a short story written by F. Scott Fitzgerald and featured in the Saturday Evening Post on August 9, 1930. The story is based on Ludlow Fowler's brother, Powell Fowler, May 1930 Paris wedding. It is Fitzgerald's first story dealing with the stock market crash and celebrates the end of the period when wealthy Americans colonized Paris.

== Summary ==
The story begins in Normandy, sometime around May. The main character, Mike Curly, is introduced, along with the news that his ex-girlfriend, Caroline Dandy, whom he dated for two years, is engaged and will be getting married in Paris. It explains that the two broke up because of Michael's lack of money. He was devastated and could not let go, evident by his insecurity and the fact that he carried around photographs of her. He also stayed away from other girls, that she would do the same with men. One day outside of a shop, he encounters Caroline and her fiancé, Hamilton Rutherford. Rutherford invites Michael to a string of events, including his bachelor dinner, a party, and tea. As they talk, his feelings for her resurge. As they parted ways, Michael feels he will never be happy again. At his hotel, the concierge delivers a telegram, which states that his grandfather died and that he would be inheriting a quarter of a million dollars. Because of his newly found fortune he seemingly out of nowhere inherited a sum of confidence, so he decides he will try to win Caroline back.

When he attends one of the parties, he meets Hamilton's father, and as more people arrive, he feels increasingly inadequate. When he finds Caroline, he is reluctant to tell her about his inheritance. They eventually dance together, and she explains how she is over him and that he should do the same. She says she feels sorry for him, and that she needs someone like Hamilton to make all the decisions. Gathering enough nerve, Michael writes to Hamilton to confront him about his intentions and asks him to meet in the bar of a hotel. Michael arrives and overhears Hamilton talking to another man about how easy it is to control a woman, and that you cannot stand for any nonsense—adding, that there hardly any men who possess their wives anymore and that he is going to be one of them. Michael becomes outraged and questions his out-of-date attitude. Hamilton strikes back, saying that Michael is too soft. Eventually, Hamilton says goodbye and leaves.

Michael rolls up at the next party with new clothing. A woman, Marjorie Collins, shows up and demands to speak to Hamilton, threatening to cause a scene. Michael avoids the drama and goes to see Caroline at her hotel. They argue about how Hamilton treats her, and Michael eventually confesses his love for her. He tries to explain to her he has money now that his love for her is true and that he can't survive without her. Caroline does not seem to care and she notices he has new, expensive clothes. At this point, Michael tells her about his inheritance. "I have the money, my grandfather left me about a quarter of a million dollars." quoted Michael. "How perfectly well! I can't tell you how glad I am... you were always a person who ought to have money." quoted Caroline.

Hamilton returns from the party and explains that the woman who tried to blackmail him gave him a secret code to a telegram. As he opens a telegram, he discovers that all of his fortunes are gone, because he had stuck with a mistake for too long. At the point when Caroline could decide to stay with Hamilton or leave him for a newly rich Michael, she surprisingly chooses Hamilton. Michael attends the ceremony, and he learns from an acquaintance, George Packman, that a man had offered Hamilton a substantial salaried job right before the wedding. As the reception carries on, Michael realizes that he has not thought of Caroline for hours and that he was cured from his inability to move on. He is no longer bitter, and the story concludes with him wondering which bridesmaid he has made a date with for that night.

=== Historical parts ===
The Jazz Age represented a break with tradition, due to the feeling of disconnect created by modernity. It was the "decade of prosperity, excess and abandon, which began after the end of World War I and ended with the 1929 stock market crash." Fitzgerald was included in the Lost Generation, a group of U.S. writers who grew up during the war and created their literary reputations in the 1920s. They were "lost" because in the postwar world, the values that were passed on to them seemed irrelevant. They possessed a spiritual alienation from a country that appeared to be "provincial, materialistic and emotionally barren." As James L. West, Penn State Fitzgerald scholar, said, "He [Fitzgerald] saw with considerable accuracy, the excesses and gaudiness of American society in the modern era—but he saw the great willingness of the heart that's also deeply American."

== Criticism ==
One life event relatable to "The Bridal Party" occurred when his then-fiancée, Zelda Sayre, broke off their engagement because of Fitzgerald's poor economic status. After his novel This Side of Paradise was published, it provided him with almost instant success, and a week later he married Zelda. Around 1930, he was drinking "heavily when Powell Fowler was married in Paris—there was a round of parties from which he never sobered up." Like his life at that time, The Bridal Party focuses on themes such as the Great Depression, and whether one should marry for love or money. Although this was one of the earliest examples of biographical correlations found in Fitzgerald's work, his novels This Side of Paradise, Tender is the night, and many others contain more similarities to his life—particularly the tumultuous relationship he had with his schizophrenic wife Zelda.

Growing up during the Great Depression and between world wars, Fitzgerald provides a romantic and economic parallel in "The Bridal Party". Michael Curly's statement, "I don't want to live—I used to dream about our home, our children," accurately reflects the mindset of American people during and after the stock market crash of 1929. For those who lost their homes, life savings and notions of the American dream, it was hard to find a way out of their predicament. The turning point for the protagonist in this story can be seen as the sunlit door from which his newlywed ex-girlfriend exits, "forward to the future."

"The Bridal Party" is Fitzgerald's first story that touches on the dramatic effects of such a devastating event as the stock market crash. Though other themes are evident throughout the story, such as the effects of wealth on society, and excessive parties set in the Roaring Twenties, the relationship between Mr. Curly and his ex, Caroline can easily be compared to the stock market crash. The news of her engagement delivers a sudden grim reality to Michael, much like the Great Depression itself. It is assumed that Michael and his ex-girlfriend had a great relationship before their separation, but the reader finds that he "lost her slowly, tragically, uselessly, because he had no money." This must have been how stock traders on Wall Street felt as they watched the value of stocks decline and tried to sell them in a panic on Black Thursday, October 24, 1929. When he discovers that she is going to marry another, richer, man he pessimistically thought, "I will never be happy at all anymore." It is obvious that he is overreacting to horrible news and does not know what to think about the situation. Even Michael's view of Caroline's appearance as "strained and tired—shadows under her eyes" is reminiscent of Dorothea Lange's documentary photographs from the Great Depression. Her subjects, like those seen in Migrant Mother, are abandoned and desperate with little hope in their faces. Caroline later says that she feels sorry for the way they were, but she was over him, and he should move on as well. His depression was intensified by feelings of inadequacy, due to a lack of money. Seeing his ex with another man only made his misery worse. His situation is similar to that of Americans during that time because neither had experienced such widespread economic failure.

As pompous and misogynistic as her fiancé was, he rightfully says, "Your affair was founded on sorrow, it seems to me that a marriage ought to be based on hope." Perhaps the same hope that people needed during the thirties to recover from the Great Depression. Luckily, Franklin D. Roosevelt's plans for a New Deal and the economic resurgence provided by World War II pulled the country out of its rut. After Michael "floats in an abyss of helplessness", he finally gains the ability to let go. A simple change in his attitude causes the "bitterness to melt out of him," and he is finally able to move on. Though Michael is initially heartbroken, his "New Deal" is finding inner peace by realizing how happy the two are and that he would not be able to have a good future by dwelling on the negative past. While this story possesses significant ties to the stock market crash and the Great Depression, it is relevant today because of the current concerns about recession.
