= A New Leaf (short story) =

1931 short story by F. Scott Fitzgerald

- Short story by F. Scott Fitzgerald
- Country: United States
- Language: English
- Genres: Fiction, short story

Publication
- Published in: The Saturday Evening Post
- Publication date: July 4, 1931

"A New Leaf" is a short story by F. Scott Fitzgerald that published in July 1931 in The Saturday Evening Post.

== Synopsis ==
The story of four young Americans in Paris. Includes the betrayal of "true love."
