= The Vegetable =

1923 short story by F. Scott Fitzgerald

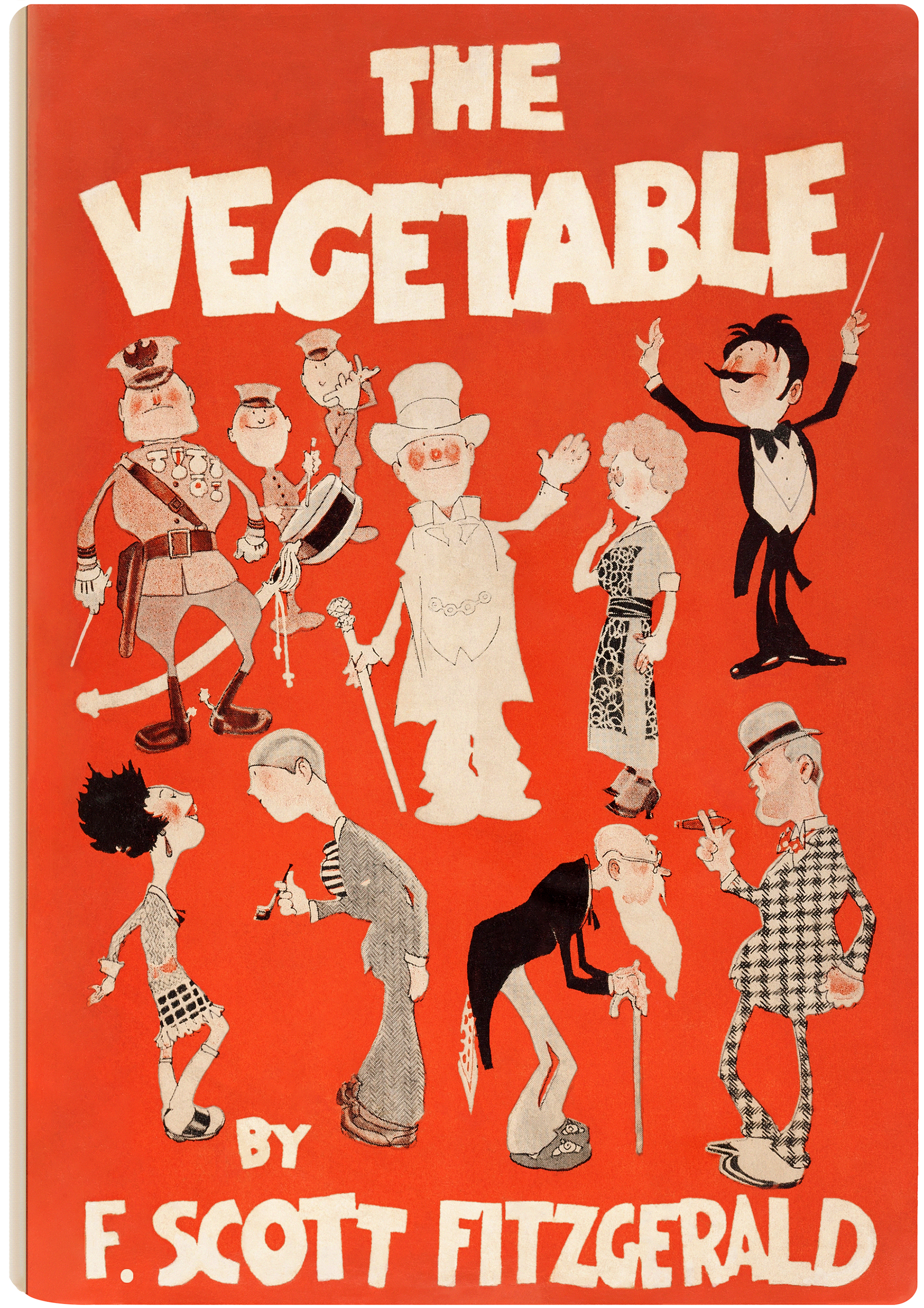
- First edition cover for the 1923 Scriber's publication
- Original language: English
- Written by: F. Scott Fitzgerald
- Based on: a short story by F. Scott Fitzgerald
- Characters: Jerry Frost; Charlotte Frost
- Genre: Comedy; Political satire

Premiere
- Date: November 19, 1923
- Place: Nixon's Apollo Theatre, Atlantic City, New Jersey

The Vegetable or From President to Postman, more commonly known simply as The Vegetable, is a 1923 play by American writer F. Scott Fitzgerald. It is his only play and is based on one of his short stories.

== Background ==
In the original publication of The Vegetable, or From President to Postman (1923), F. Scott Fitzgerald included the following quotation on the title page: “Any man who doesn’t want to get on in the world, to make a million dollars, and maybe even park his toothbrush in the White House, hasn’t got as much to him as a good dog has—he’s nothing more or less than a vegetable.” Fitzgerald used this quotation, which he claimed came “from a current magazine,” as a springboard for his only published play. This comic romp satirizes the ambitions of an ordinary man who wants to be president of the United States—that is, if he cannot make it as a postman.

== Plot ==
The play concerns the misadventures of the middle-class striver Jerry Frost. He is a 35-year-old "clerk for the railroad at $3,000 a year. He possesses no eyebrows, but nevertheless he constantly tries to knit them." He is constantly criticized by his wife Charlotte, and their marriage is dull. We learn in the first act that Jerry wanted to be a postman, but that he somehow blames his wife for missing on this ambition.

== History ==
Following The Beautiful and Damned, Fitzgerald hoped to secure financial wealth for him and his wife. The play's text was published in book form by Scribners on April 27, 1923 in a print run of 7,650 copies, each sold for $1.50.

In his youth, Fitzgerald had written and acted in plays (cf. The Captured Shadow), and his work was generally recognized for qualities that should have translated to the stage: "he wrote commercially successful stories; he knew how to frame a scene; and his dialogue, at least in his best fiction, was smart, sophisticated, evocative."

However, according to some critics, the play lacked focus. Its premiere, in a single preview (Nov. 19, 1923) at Nixon's Apollo Theatre in Atlantic City, New Jersey, was widely regarded as a disaster. Zelda Fitzgerald later wrote in a letter that the audience were “so obviously bored” and some walked out during the second act. Fitzgerald wrote that "I wanted to stop the show and say it was all a mistake but the actors struggled heroically on." During the second intermission, Fitzgerald and Ring Lardner asked the lead actor Ernest Truex, "Are you going to stay and do the last act?" The actor replied that he was, at which the pair of writers retorted that they were heading to a bar down the street.

Although it is sometimes claimed that the play ran for only one performance, newspaper ads from November 1923 show that Truex and the company of the play finished the week's run at the Apollo. The production then traveled to Wilmington, Delaware, where it ran for another week at the Playhouse Theatre. On November 30th and December 1st, it was performed at the Stamford Theatre in Connecticut. But at that point, the producers announced that the show was not going to Broadway, and the play was being with withdrawn for further revisions.

While Fitzgerald claimed to be proud of the work and had hoped it would succeed, the critical and public reaction to the play left the author in a deep depression, followed by a drinking binge.

It was, however, revived years later and produced by Lenox Hill Players, Inc. at the Cherry Lane Theatre in New York City on April 10, 1929. It ran for 13 performances.

As a work first published in 1923, The Vegetable entered the public domain in the United States on January 1, 2019.
