= All the Sad Young Men =

1926 story collection by F. Scott Fitzgerald

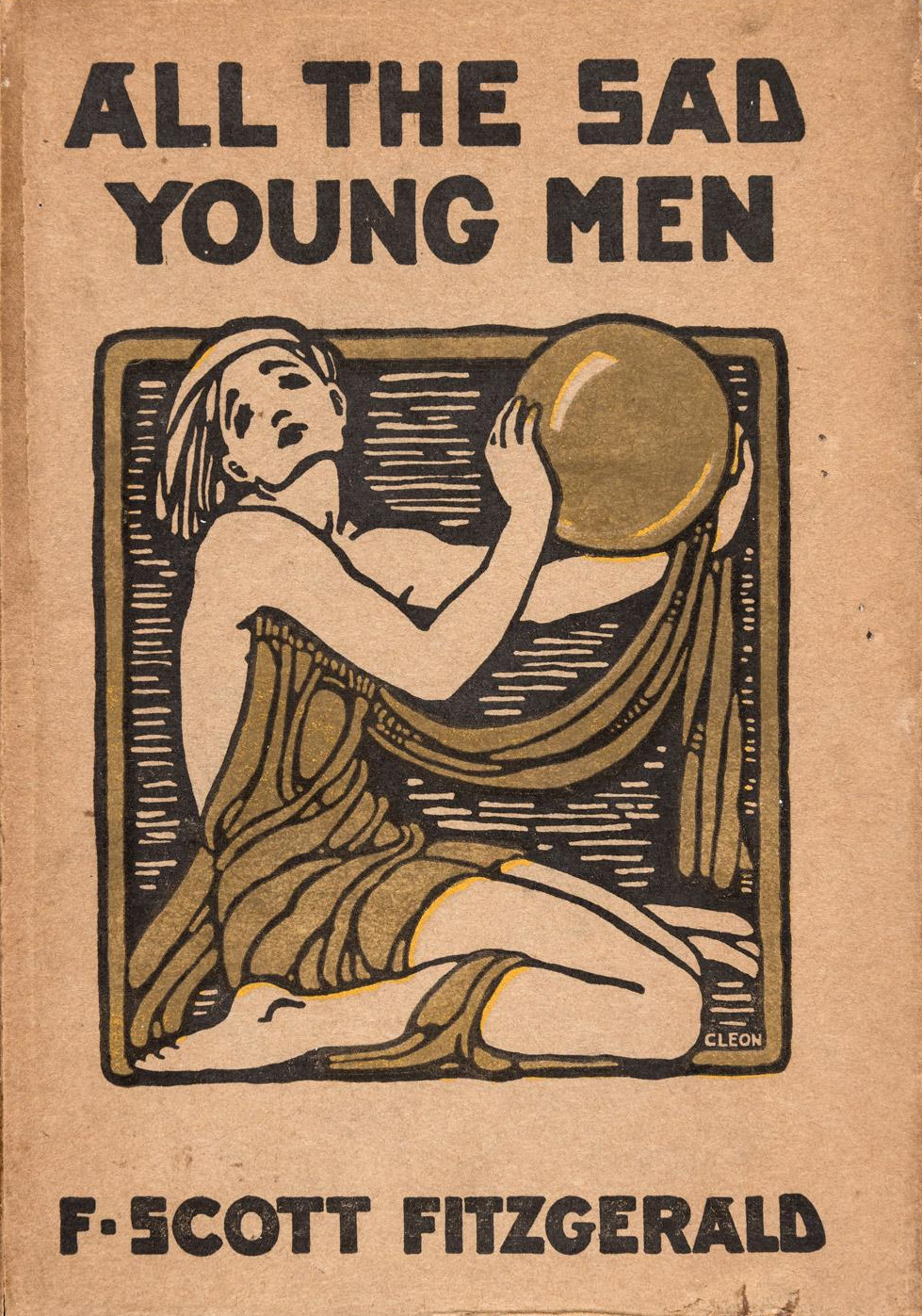
- First edition
- Author: F. Scott Fitzgerald
- Cover artist: Cleo Damianakes
- Language: English
- Publisher: Charles Scribner's Sons
- Publication date: February 1926
- Publication place: United States
- Media type: Print (hardback)

All the Sad Young Men is a collection of short fiction by American writer F. Scott Fitzgerald. The stories originally appeared independently in popular literary journals and were first collected in February 1926 by Charles Scribner's Sons.

== Stories ==
The original periodical publication and date are indicated below.

- "The Rich Boy" (Redbook, January/February 1926)
- "Winter Dreams" (Metropolitan, December 1922)
- "The Baby Party" (Hearst's International Cosmopolitan, February 1925)
- "Absolution" (American Mercury, June 1924)
- "Rags Martin-Jones and the Pr-nce of W-les" (McCall's, July 1924)
- "The Adjuster" (American Mercury, 1926)
- "Hot and Cold Blood" (Hearst's International Cosmopolitan, August, 1923)
- "The Sensible Thing" (Liberty, July 15, 1924)
- "Gretchen's Forty Winks" (The Saturday Evening Post, March 15, 1924)

== Background ==
In a letter to Scribner editor-in-chief Maxwell Perkins, Fitzgerald wrote that "seven of the stories deal with young men of my generation in rather unhappy moods" to justify the title of the collection. Biographer Kenneth Eble notes that the volume's title reflects with precision the final years of Fitzgerald's youth in the late 1920s: "All the Sad Young Men captures in a phrase the feeling he had in losing the most vibrant experiences of his life before age took them away."

Fitzgerald wrote the stories at a time of disillusionment. He was in financial difficulty, he believed his wife Zelda to be romantically involved with another man, she had suffered a series of physical illnesses, and his play The Vegetable had been a failure.

== Reception ==
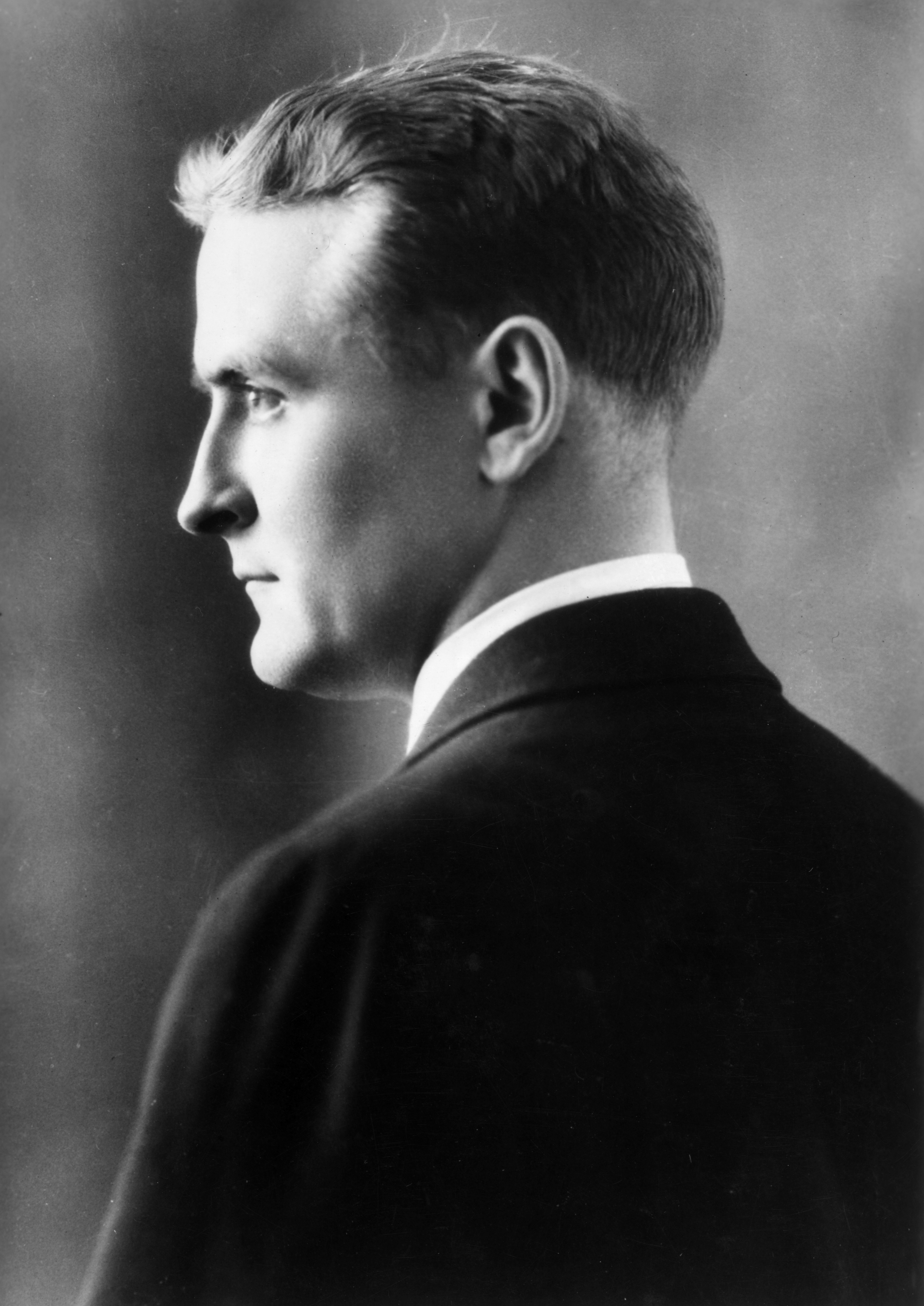
F. Scott Fitzgerald

Upon publication—and somewhat belying the notion that Fitzgerald's most famous novel had not been enthusiastically received—The New York Times wrote, "The publication of this volume of short stories might easily have been an anti-climax after the perfection and success of The Great Gatsby of last Spring. A novel so widely praised — by people whose recognition counts — is stiff competition. It is even something of a problem for a reviewer to find new and different words to properly grace the occasion. It must be said that the collection as a whole is not sustained to the high excellence of The Great Gatsby, but it has stories of fine insight and finished craft."

Ironically, in a letter nine months earlier, Fitzgerald had advised his editor Max Perkins against publicizing the book through the newspaper. "Rather not use advertising appropriation in Times—people who read Times Book Review won't be interested in me."

== Critical appraisal ==
In a letter to Scribner's editor-in-chief Maxwell Perkins, Fitzgerald explained that "seven of the stories deal with young men of my generation in rather unhappy moods" to justify his choice for the collections' title. Biographer John Kuehl notes that the volume's title reflects with precision the final years of Fitzgerald's youth in the late 1920s: "All the Sad Young Men captures in a phrase the feeling he had in losing the most vibrant experiences of his life before age took them away."

Biographer Kenneth Eble ranks three stories—"The Rich Boy," "Winter Dreams," and "Absolution"—as "worth including" in the collection and "among the better ones in all his short fiction." The other selections are reminiscent of Fitzgerald's "contrived magazine fiction." According to Eble, the author himself characterized some of the short fiction as "cheap and without the spontaneity of my first work."
