= The Boy Detective Fails =

The Boy Detective Fails is the fourth novel by Chicago author Joe Meno, released by Punk Planet Books in 2006.

== Plot summary ==
In the twilight of a childhood full of wonder, Billy Argo, boy detective, is brokenhearted to find his young sister and crime-solving partner, Caroline, has committed suicide. Ten years later, Billy, age thirty, returns from an extended stay at Shady Glens Facility for Mental Competence to discover a world full of unimaginable strangeness: office buildings vanish without reason, small animals turn up without their heads, and cruel villains ride city buses to complete their evil schemes.

Lost within this unwelcoming place, Billy finds the companionship of two lonely children, Effie and Gus Mumford—one a science fair genius, the other a charming, silent bully. With a nearly forgotten bravery, Billy confronts the monotony of his job in telephone sales, the awkward beauty of a desperate pickpocket named Penny Maple, and the seemingly impossible solution to the mystery of his sister's death. Along a path laden with hidden clues and codes that dare to be deciphered, the boy detective may learn the greatest secret of all: the necessity of the unknown.

== Musical ==
Author Joe Meno collaborated with composer and lyricist Adam Gwon to adapt the novel into a musical of the same name, which premiered in August–October 2011 at the Signature Theatre (Arlington, Virginia).

Nine years after the run at Signature Theatre, director/playwright Aaron Posner directed a new version of the musical at American University's Greenberg Theatre for a four-show run from February 13–15, 2020. This new version was developed in workshop with Joe Meno and Adam Gwon, and featured cuts, edits, new songs, and an adjusted plot/storyline.

== Musical characters ==
Note: These are characters that appear only in the musical version, and are listed as so from the Characters section of the script.

=== Character list ===
- Billy Argo
- Caroline Argo
- Fenton Mills
- Professor Von Golum
- Penny / Ensemble
- Larry / Mr. Mammoth / Ensemble
- Detective Brown / Ensemble
- Dale Hardly / Ensemble
- Violet Dew / Ensemble
- Therapist / Ensemble (Female)
- Nurse Eloise / Ensemble
- Ensemble

== Cast ==
Character:	Signature Theater Original Cast	American University Workshop Cast
Billy Argo	Stephen Gregory Smith	Spencer Coben
Caroline Argo	Margo Seibert	Emma Wallach
Fenton Mills	James Gardiner	Patrick Donoughe
Professor Von Golum	Thomas Adrian Simpson	Ally Baca
Penny / Ensemble	Anika Larsen	Madison Greene
Larry / Mr. Mammoth / Ensemble	Harry A. Winter	Ross Bollinger
Detective Brown / Ensemble	Russell Simpson	Janie Goheen
Dale Hardly / Ensemble	Evan Casey	Graciela Rey
Violet Dew / Ensemble	Tracy Lynn Olivera	Bekah Zornosa
Nurse Eloise / Ensemble	Tracy Lynn Olivera	Kacy Sullivan
Therapist / Ensemble	Sherri L. Edelen	Sultana Qureshi
Ensemble		Dominic Brunaccioni, Zach Dore, Daniella Ignacio, Natasha Sookrah, Kelsey Walker

== Musical numbers ==
Act 1

- "Prologue" – Company
- "Billy Argo, Boy Detective" – Company
- "Caroline" – Billy, Ensemble
- "Amazing" – Larry, Billy, Ensemble
- "Out of My Mind" – Von Golum, Billy, Ensemble
- "Old Tree House" – Billy, Caroline, Fenton, Ensemble
- "As Long As You Are Here" – Penny, Billy, Ensemble
- "Evil" – Von Golum, Billy, Ensemble
- "Haunted Mansion" – Billy, Caroline, Fenton, Ensemble
- "I Like (The Secret Song)" – Billy, Penny
- "After Secrets/Haunted" – Billy, Ensemble

Act 2

- "Entr'act" – Company
- "That's All" – Billy, Dale, Violet, Ensemble
- "Little Mysteries" – Penny, Billy
- "Amazing (Reprise)" – Larry, Billy, Ensemble
- "Billy Argo, Boy Detective (Reprise)" – Ensemble
- "Always" – Von Golum, Billy
- "Let Me Save You" – Billy, Ensemble
- "Finale" – Company
