= Adam Gwon =

American composer and lyricist

- Education: NYU Tisch School of the Arts
- Occupations: Composer; lyricist
- Notable work: Ordinary Days
- Website: adamgwon.com

Adam Gwon is an American composer and lyricist living in New York City.

== Personal life ==
Gwon was born in Boston, and spent his childhood in Baltimore before attending New York University Tisch School of the Arts. While studying acting at NYU, Gwon was encouraged to pursue writing by a teacher, David Bucknam, and was later mentored by the musical theater writing team of Lynn Ahrens and Stephen Flaherty. Gwon is of Chinese-American and Jewish descent.

== Professional life ==
Gwon made his off-Broadway debut in 2009 with Ordinary Days, the first musical production in Roundabout Theatre Company's black box space, Roundabout Underground. In 2011, Signature Theatre in Arlington, Virginia, premiered Gwon's musical The Boy Detective Fails, based on the novel by Joe Meno, as part of their American Musical Voices Project. South Coast Repertory commissioned and premiered his musical Cloudlands, written with Octavio Solis, in 2012.

In 2015, Gwon had two simultaneous world premieres, both co-written with Julia Jordan: Bernice Bobs Her Hair, adapted from the F. Scott Fitzgerald short story, at the Lyric Theatre of Oklahoma, and Cake Off at Signature Theatre in Arlington, Virginia. Cake Off received a Helen Hayes Award nomination for Outstanding Original Play or Musical Adaptation.

Village Theatre in Issaquah, Washington, produced the world premiere of Gwon's musical String, with a book by Sarah Hammond, in 2018.

Gwon's Ordinary Days was preserved on a cast album and has been produced in London's West End and around the world from Paris to Rio de Janeiro. A 2018 revival by the Keen Company was nominated for a Drama League Award for Best Revival of a Broadway or Off-Broadway Musical.

Gwon's song "I'll Be Here" was recorded by Audra McDonald on her album Go Back Home. McDonald has performed the song in concert, including at Carnegie Hall and Lincoln Center. It aired on PBS's Live from Lincoln Center in 2013.

He served a three-year term on the Tony Awards Nominating Committee, beginning in 2015.

Gwon's musical Scotland, PA, with book by Michael Mitnick, adapted from the cult 2001 film, premiered at Roundabout Theatre Company's Laura Pels Theatre in 2019.

Gwon's musical All the World's a Stage premiered at Keen Company in 2025, and subsequently released a cast recording.

== Honors ==
In 2008, Gwon was the fourth annual recipient of the Fred Ebb Foundation Award, presented to aspiring composer/lyricists.

In 2011, Gwon received the Kleban Prize for most promising musical theater lyricist. The award included a $100,000 cash prize.

== Musicals ==
| Year | Title | Music | Lyrics | Book | Notes | Ref. |
|---|---|---|---|---|---|---|
| 2009 | Ordinary Days | Adam Gwon | | | | |
| 2011 | The Boy Detective Fails | Adam Gwon | | Joe Meno | based on the novel by Joe Meno | |
| 2012 | Cloudlands | Adam Gwon | Adam Gwon & Octavio Solis | Octavio Solis | | |
| 2015 | Bernice Bobs Her Hair | Adam Gwon | Adam Gwon & Julia Jordan | Julia Jordan | based on the short story by F. Scott Fitzgerald | |
| 2015 | Cake Off | Adam Gwon | Adam Gwon & Julia Jordan | Julia Jordan & Sheri Wilner | based on the play Bake Off by Sheri Wilner | |
| 2018 | String | Adam Gwon | | Sarah Hammond | | |
| 2019 | Scotland, PA | Adam Gwon | | Michael Mitnick | based on the film by Billy Morrissette | |
| 2022 | Witnesses | Jordan Beck & Gerald Sternback, Carmel Dean & Mindi Dickstein, Matt Gould, Adam Gwon, and Anna K. Jacobs | | Robert L. Freedman | | |
| 2025 | All the World's a Stage | Adam Gwon | | | | |

== Discography ==
- Ordinary Days
- Go Back Home
- The Essential Liz Callaway
- Because
- 16 Stories
- String
- All the World's a Stage
