= Bernice Bobs Her Hair =

1920 short story by F. Scott Fitzgerald

- Short story by F. Scott Fitzgerald
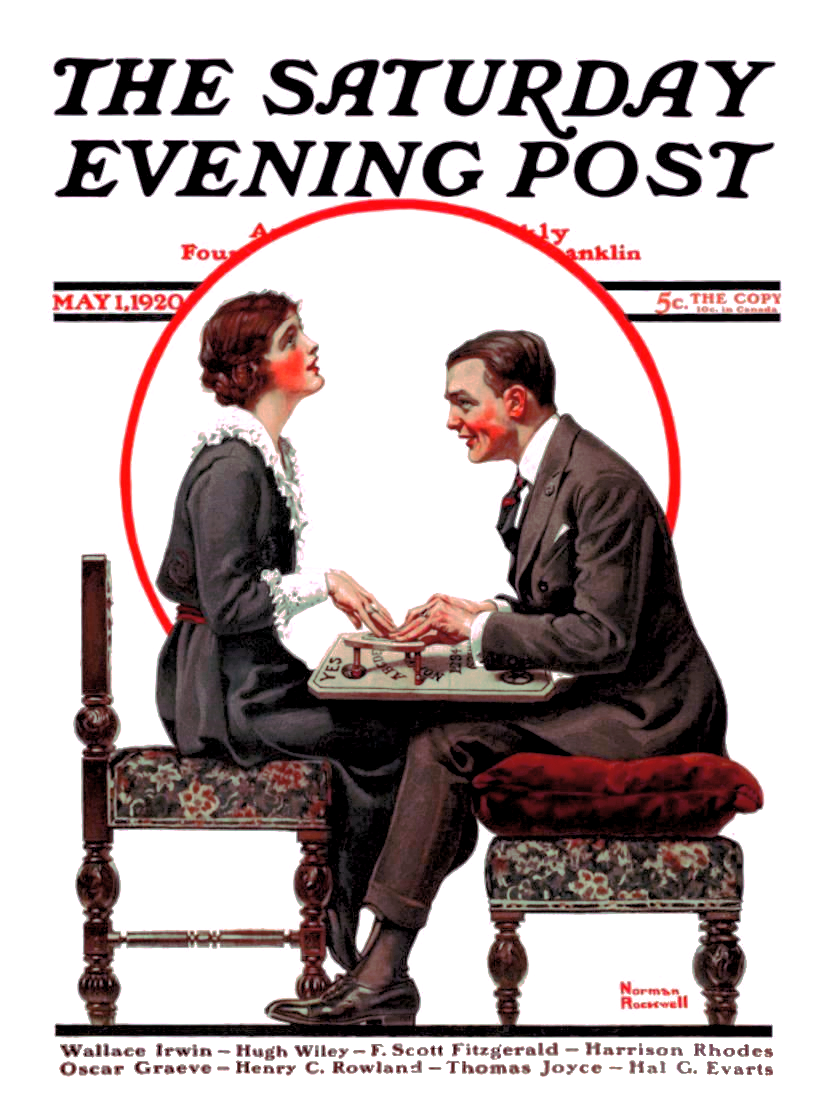
- The May 1, 1920, issue of The Saturday Evening Post with "Bernice Bobs Her Hair".

Text available at Wikisource
- Country: United States
- Language: English
- Genre: Short story

Publication
- Published in: The Saturday Evening Post; Flappers and Philosophers
- Publication type: Magazine; Short Story Collection
- Media type: Print
- Publication date: May 1, 1920 (as short story); September 10, 1920 (in collection)

"Bernice Bobs Her Hair" is a 1920 short story by American writer F. Scott Fitzgerald. Fitzgerald's story follows the plight of a mixed-race Native American girl named Bernice from rural Eau Claire, Wisconsin. Bernice visits her sophisticated white cousin Marjorie in the city, presumably Saint Paul, Minnesota. Initially socially awkward, Bernice's popularity soon eclipses her cousin. Seeking to sabotage her reputation, Marjorie tricks Bernice into going through with her declaration to bob her hair.

First published in May 1920 in The Saturday Evening Post with illustrations by May Wilson Preston, "Bernice Bobs Her Hair" became Fitzgerald's first short story to achieve national attention. The issue marked the first time Fitzgerald's name appeared on the magazine's cover. The work appeared in the September 1920 short story collection Flappers and Philosophers published by Charles Scribner's Sons and inspired the cover illustration by W. E. Hill for its dust jacket.

In 1951, decades after its publication, critic Orville Prescott of The New York Times hailed Fitzgerald's story as a landmark in American literature that defined the social standards for the Jazz Age generation by examining the mystique of popularity. In recent decades, scholarship often focuses on the story's racial aspects, particularly Bernice's mixed-race character attempting to pass in white society.

== Background ==
In 1915, while attending Princeton University, a 19-year-old F. Scott Fitzgerald received a letter from his 14-year-old sister Annabel seeking advice on becoming socially popular. His lengthy reply offered guidance on improving her social skills and detailed strategies to achieve popularity. This ten-page letter to Annabel provided advice on poise, carriage, conversation, dancing and other subjects.

Four years later, Fitzgerald drew upon this letter for the basis of a short story about a socially awkward young woman. He cut nearly 3,000 words from the original draft and altered the ending to make the story more saleable to slick magazines such as The Saturday Evening Post.

Fitzgerald likely named the title character Bernice as a reference to Berenice II of Egypt, the wife of Ptolemy III. According to legend, Berenice sacrificed her most beloved possession—her tresses—to ensure victory in warfare during the Third Syrian War. For this act, the gods bestowed on her a great honor: they placed her tresses in the heavens as the constellation Coma Berenices.

== Plot summary ==
"Bernice Bobs Her Hair" illustrations by artist May Wilson Preston, May 1920

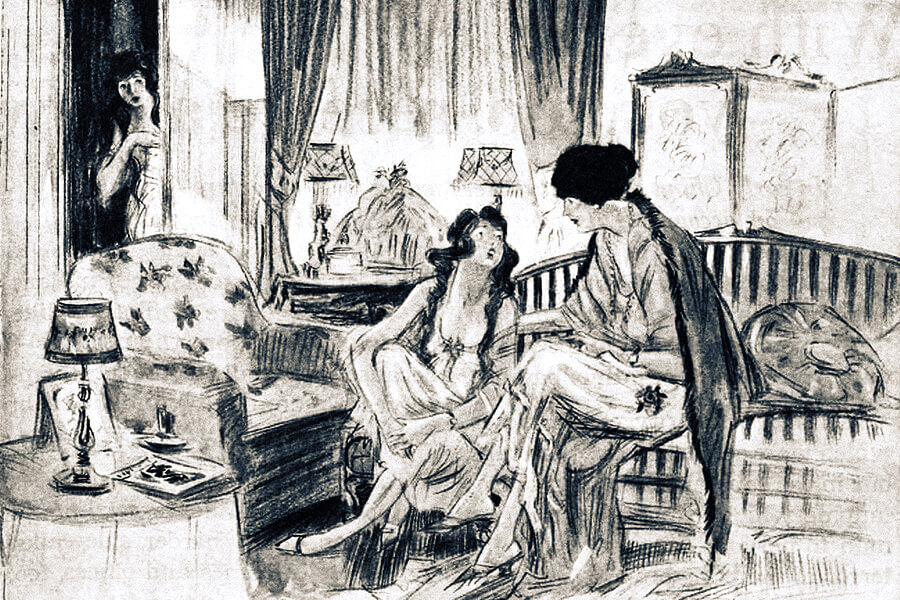
"Well," said Marjorie, "No girl can permanently bolster up a lame-duck visitor, because these days it's every girl for herself."

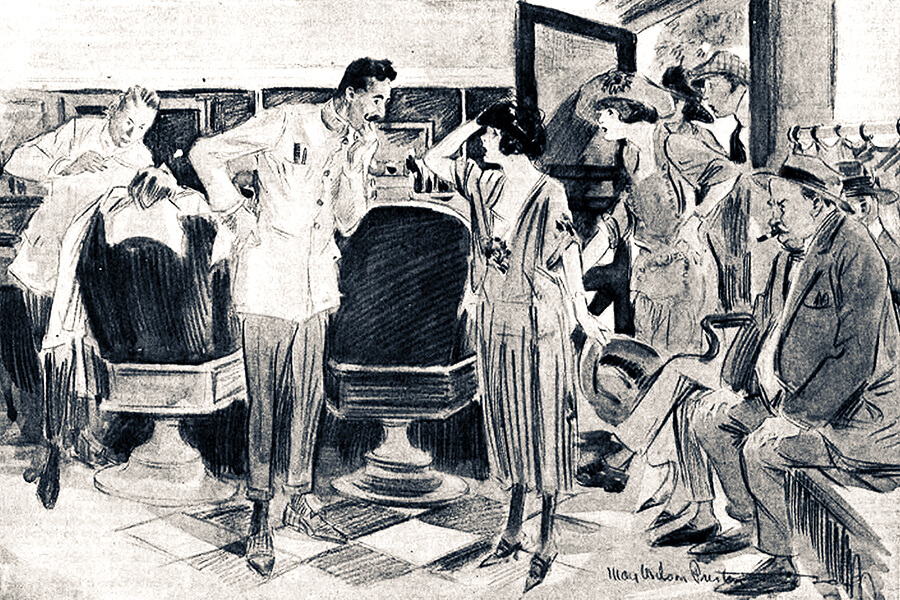
"My hair—bob it!"

Bernice, a mixed-race girl from rural Eau Claire, Wisconsin, visits her sophisticated white cousin Marjorie Harvey in the city for the month of August. At a Saturday night dance, none of the young men wish to interact with Bernice, with Bernice's conversation with Warren going poorly, and Marjorie deems Bernice to be a drag on her social life.

That evening, after having gone to her room, Bernice overhears a conversation between Marjorie and Marjorie's mother, Josephine, where Marjorie ascribes Bernice's social awkwardness and taciturn nature to Bernice's Native American ancestry, and she declares Bernice to be socially hopeless; while her mother tells her to "Go to bed, you silly child". Marjorie's comments hurt Bernice.

The next morning, Bernice threatens to leave town. Indifferent to her threat, which she calls as a bluff, Marjorie persuades Bernice to let her transform her into a society girl. She teaches Bernice how to flirt and dance with boys to make herself seem more socially desirable. At the next party, Bernice teases the boys with the idea that she will soon bob her hair—a controversial act—which the boys will get to watch.

Bernice becomes popular with the boys, especially Warren McIntyre who lives across the street. Although Warren has been in love with Marjorie since childhood, Marjorie neglects Warren. When Marjorie realizes that Warren likes Bernice, she plots to humiliate Bernice by tricking her into bobbing her hair.

Marjorie announces to various boys that Bernice never intended to bob her hair. To prove Marjorie wrong, Bernice reluctantly consents to go to a barbershop with Warren, Marjorie and a coterie of admirers. After Bernice bobs her hair, the boys abruptly lose interest in her and she realizes Marjorie tricked her.

Marjorie's mother fears Bernice's flapper haircut will provoke a scandal at a party in Marjorie's honor, to be held the next day. Bernice, deciding to return home before the party, packs her trunk in the middle of the night and plans to leave by train after midnight. Before she leaves, Bernice sneaks into Marjorie's bedroom and cuts off her sleeping cousin's hair braids.

While leaving the house, Bernice notices Warren's house across the street. Realizing she still holds Marjorie's braids, Bernice tosses them onto Warren's front porch and shouts, "Scalp the selfish thing!" Picking up her luggage, Bernice runs down the moonlit street to the train station.

== Critical analysis ==
"I think it's that crazy Indian blood in Bernice," remarks Marjorie. "Maybe she's a reversion to type. Indian women all just sat round and never said anything."

— F. Scott Fitzgerald, "Bernice Bobs Her Hair"

In May 1951, over ten years after Fitzgerald's death and three decades after the story's publication in The Saturday Evening Post, critic Orville Prescott of The New York Times hailed Fitzgerald's short story as a landmark in American literature "that set social standards for a generation of young Americans, that revealed secrets of popularity and gave wonderful examples of what to say at a dinner table or on the dance floor."

In more recent decades, scholarship often focuses on the story's underlying racial tensions and climax, interpreting Bernice's behavior as a mixed-race Native American girl attempting to pass in white society. Scholars Robert Roulston, Susan Beegel, Nikhil Gupta, and others interpret the story through this racial lens. These analyses focus on scenes in Fitzgerald's story where Marjorie, Bernice's white cousin, attributes Bernice's unpopularity and submissive nature to her "crazy Indian blood", as well as the climax in which Bernice wishes to scalp her white cousin.

== Adaptations ==
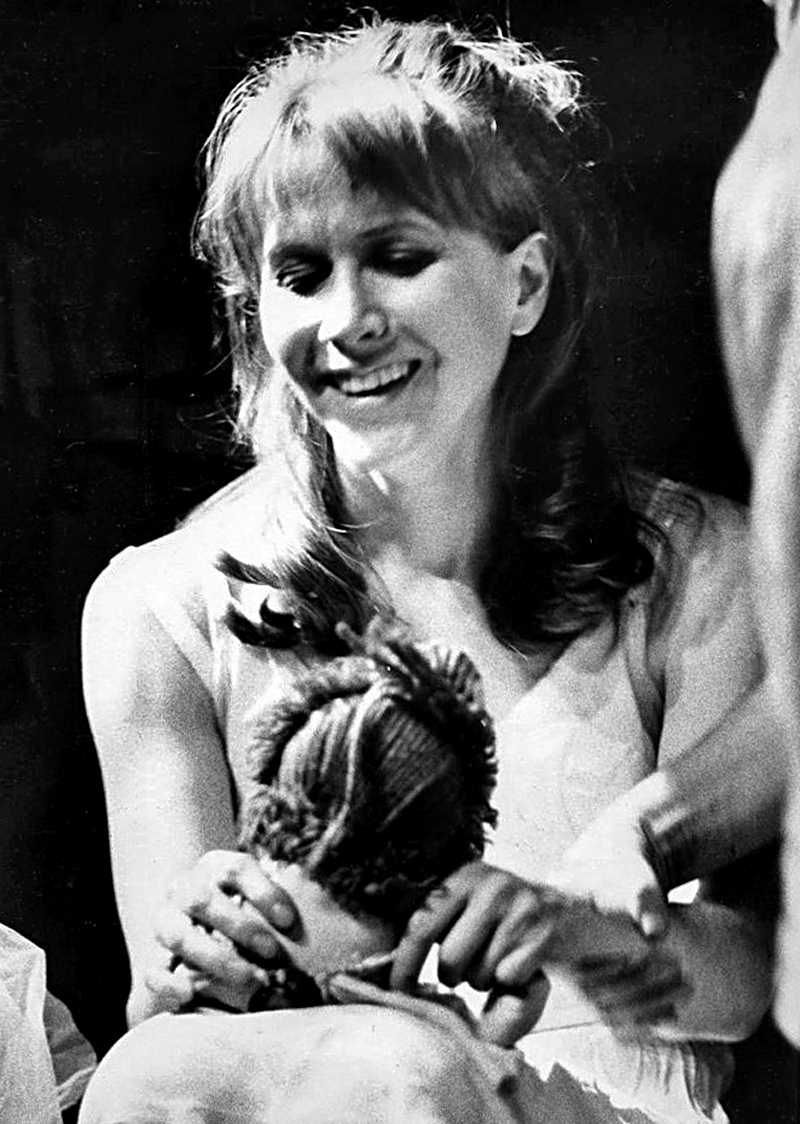
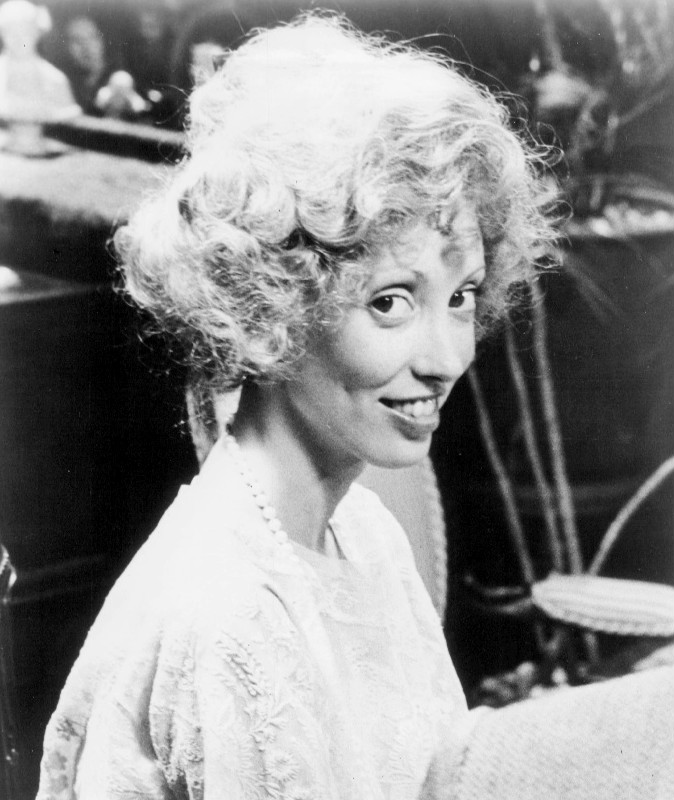
Julie Harris starred in a 1951 television adaption. Shelley Duvall starred in a 1976 adaptation.

"Bernice Bobs Her Hair" has been adapted twice for television. In 1951, CBS adapted the story for a Starlight Theatre episode starring 26-year-old Julie Harris as the pretty but boring Bernice, Mary Sinclair as Bernice's spiteful cousin Marjorie, and Jerry Paris as Otis. Novelist Anita Loos, the author of the 1925 novel Gentlemen Prefer Blondes, appeared in a cameo as herself.

In 1976, Joan Micklin Silver directed a television production created for the PBS series The American Short Story. The production starred Shelley Duvall as Bernice, Veronica Cartwright as Marjorie, and Bud Cort as Warren. Patrick Reynolds, using the stage name Patrick Byrne, played Draycott Deyo and Polly Holliday played Marjorie's mother and Bernice's aunt.

In 1982, D. D. Brooke adapted the work into a one-act play by The Dramatic Publishing Company. It was adapted into a 2015 musical by composer Adam Gwon and playwright Julia Jordan. The Northern Irish baroque pop group The Divine Comedy turned the story into a song on their 1993 album Liberation.
