= Hairstyles of the Damned =

2004 novel by Joe Meno

- First edition cover
- Author: Joe Meno
- Publisher: Punk Planet
- Publication date: September 2004
- ISBN: 1-888451-70-X

Hairstyles of the Damned is a coming-of-age novel and the third book by Chicago author Joe Meno. Released by Punk Planet Books in 2004, it has sold over 80,000 copies in ten printings. It has been optioned for film by Focus Features.

== Plot summary ==
The novel follows Brian Oswald, a typical high school outcast, through his sophomore and junior year of Catholic high school. Brian and his friends, Gretchen and Kim, were geeky misfits in middle school but the explosion of the punk music scene allowed them to craft new, tough attitudes to protect themselves against the world. Brian is hopelessly in love with his best friend Gretchen, a foul-mouthed fat girl with a penchant for getting into fights. Unfortunately for him, Gretchen is in love with a handsome Neo-Nazi named Tony Degan.

Brian attempts to get advice on how to woo Gretchen from his friends Bobby B., a handsome stoner who cheats on Kim regularly; and Rod, a quiet African-American nerd with a huge music collection. Brian makes a mixtape for Gretchen to express his love but she rebuffs his advances. Embarrassed, the two drift apart as Brian becomes friends with Mike Madden, a pot head skater, when they pair up for a class project. Meanwhile, his parents go through a divorce and Brian feels disconnected from his father, whom he previously had a close relationship with. Through Mike, Brian meets Dorie Spitzer, who eventually becomes his new girlfriend. Brain falls in love with her, but Dorie reveals she was cheating on her boyfriend with Brian. Brian attempts to convince her to break up with her boyfriend, but Dorie refuses and leaves him. Heartbroken, Brian shaves his head as an act of mourning and becomes friends with Gretchen again, who was also dumped by Tony Degan. He rejoins the punk scene as well.

An introspective person, Brian becomes increasingly aware of the class differences and racism in his town when the junior prom becomes segregated as the black and white students can't agree on the theme song. Gretchen and Kim make fun of the black students for pitching a fit but Brian defends them, saying that as outsiders, they are just doing what punks are doing: creating their own space where they can be happy. Brian becomes friends with another skater named Nick and the two spend their free time breaking into cars and scamming people to make money. Brian's feelings for Gretchen return but she turns him down again. After a disastrous date at prom, Brian picks Gretchen up with his rented limo and the two grab breakfast, as friends.

In the last few months of school, a fight breaks out between rival schools and Bobby B. is expelled for hitting another student with a weapon, much to the disappointment of his friends.

The final part of the book takes place at a Halloween party where Brian looks at the party goers and realizes that regardless of the categories they are put into (black, white, jock, punk, etc.), they are all trying to figure out their identity in the world. Brian kisses a girl at the party, but later ditches her in favor leaving the party with Gretchen when the cops come. Even though he still loves Gretchen, he is happy to sit with her as her friend.

== Reception ==
Donna Seaman, writing for Booklist, called Hairstyles of the Damned "a funny, hard-rocking first-person tale of teenage angst and discovery" and highlighted how Meno "revels in the massive confusion and helpless bravado of adolescence". Publishers Weekly similarly discussed how "Meno ably explores Brian's emotional uncertainty and his poignant youthful search for meaning". They described Brian as a "a sympathetic narrator and a prime example of awkward adolescence".

Despite an overall positive review, Seaman noted that "Meno fails to dig deeply". Conversely, Publishers Weekly found that Meno "deals honestly with teenage violence—though Gretchen's fights have a certain slapstick quality, Brian's occasional bouts of anger and destruction seem very real". However, they noted that the book "doesn't have much of a plot".
