= Dan Sinker =

American journalist (born 1975)

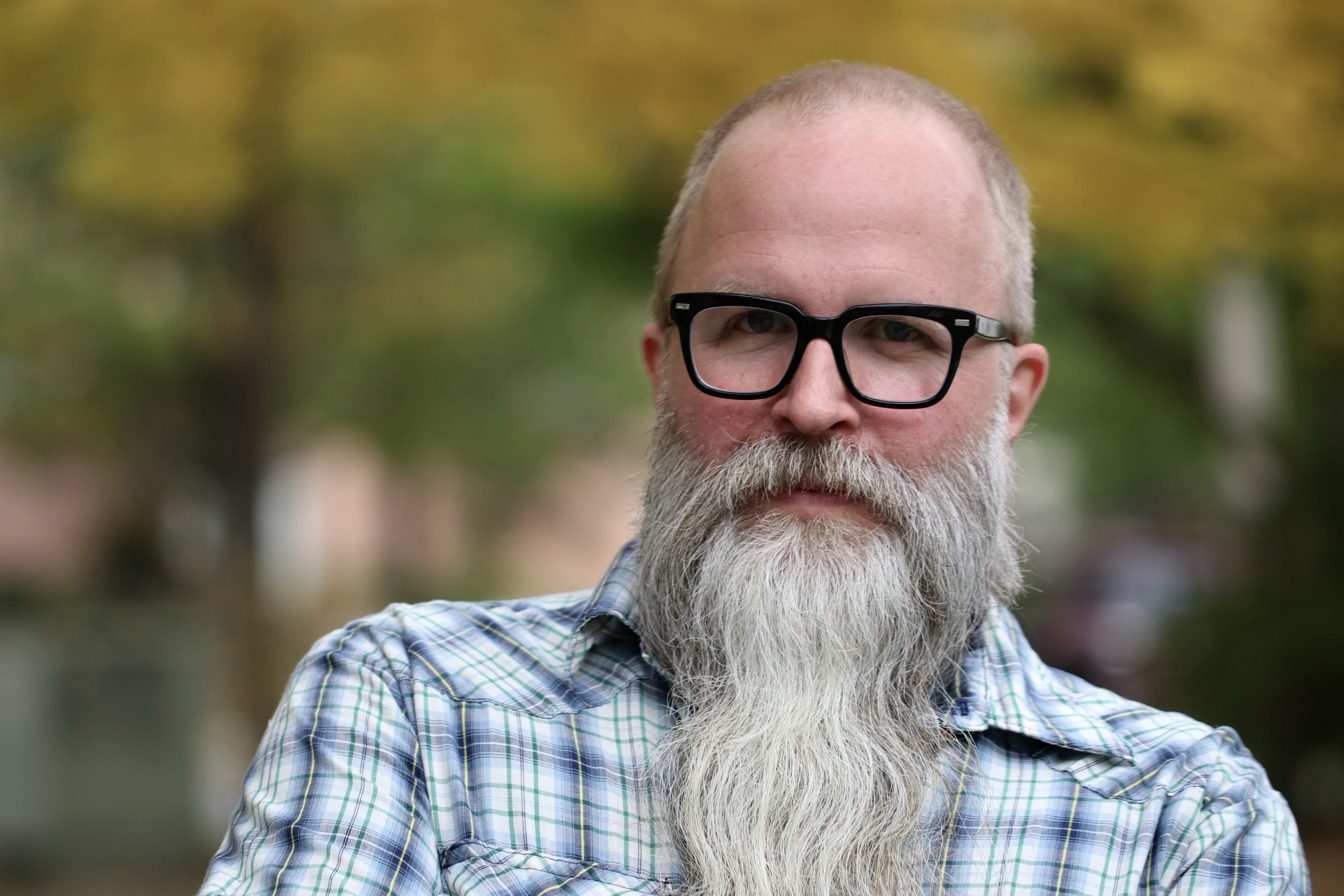
- Sinker in 2018
- Born: November 14, 1975 (age 50); London
- Education: School of the Art Institute of Chicago
- Occupations: Journalist; writer; podcaster
- Years active: 1994–present
- Website: dansinker.com

Daniel Sinker (born November 14, 1975) is an American journalist known for creating Punk Planet, a punk rock zine which ran from 1994 to 2007. He has written for Esquire, and his pieces have appeared in publications such as The New York Times, The Atlantic and Slate.

Sinker founded Punk Planet in 1994. During its eighty-issue run, he co-edited the small but influential publication, which had articles on music and politics, with Elizabeth Moore. Sinker received media attention in 2011 after revealing himself as the author of @MayorEmanuel, a popular Twitter account which satirized politician Rahm Emanuel.

From 2008 to 2011, he taught journalism full-time at Columbia College Chicago. He directed the journalism organization OpenNews from 2011 to 2018.

Sinker co-hosts the Says Who? and The Hitch podcasts.

== Personal life ==
Daniel Sinker was born on November 14, 1975. He was raised in Evanston, Illinois, He still lives in Evanston, Illinois his wife and two children. In 1996, Sinker graduated from the School of the Art Institute of Chicago with a Bachelor of Fine Arts in video art.

== Punk Planet and other work (1994-2011) ==
In 1994, at the age of 19, Sinker founded Punk Planet, an independent music, politics and culture magazine that helped to document the independent music and art scenes of the 1990s and 2000s.

From 2004 to 2011, Sinker was an assistant professor in the Journalism Department at Columbia College. In 2008, Sinker was a John S. Knight Journalism Fellowships at Stanford.

In 2010 and 2011, Sinker was the author of the @MayorEmanuel Twitter account.

== Later career (2011, on) ==
In 2011, Dan Sinker led the Knight-Mozilla News Technology Partnership of the Mozilla Foundation, which was spun out as Open News in 2017.

In September 2016, he began co-hosting the podcast Says Who? alongside young adult author Maureen Johnson. Self-described as a coping strategy, Says Who? was originally conceived as an eight-week project in which Johnson and Sinker would talk with political experts about how they were surviving news coverage of the 2016 Presidential Election. The podcast has since continued past the results of the election, switching to a biweekly, then weekly, and then, for a time, daily format in which the hosts attempt to humorously discuss the news of the day, and more personally, share how they are coping as citizens.

Since 2018, he has been an independent author and entrepreneur.

== Books ==
- We Owe You Nothing, Punk Planet: The Collected Interviews, 2001
- We Owe You Nothing: Expanded Edition: Punk Planet: The Collected Interviews (Punk Planet Books), 2007
- The F***ing Epic Twitter Quest of @MayorEmanuel, Scribner, 2011
- How I Resist (contributor), 2018
- Arte Agora: Art made, sold, or placed in the public way (foreword)
