= Flappers and Philosophers =

1920 short story collection by F. Scott Fitzgerald

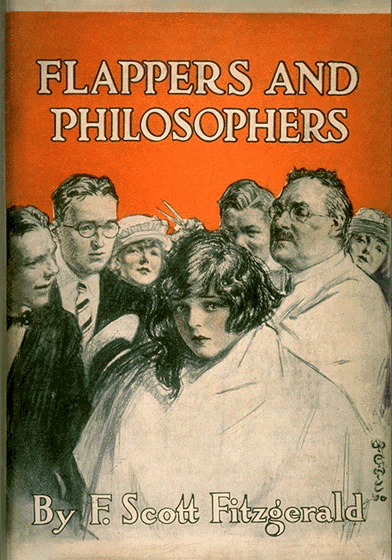
- The cover of the 1920 first edition
- Author: F. Scott Fitzgerald
- Cover artist: W. E. Hill
- Language: English
- Genre: Short stories
- Publication date: September 1920
- Publication place: United States
- Media type: Print (hardcover & paperback)
- ISBN: 978-1406509564

Flappers and Philosophers is a collection of eight short stories by American writer F. Scott Fitzgerald, published in September 1920 by Charles Scribner's Sons. Each of the stories had originally appeared, independently, in either The Saturday Evening Post, Scribner's Magazine, or The Smart Set.

The volume includes "The Ice Palace", regarded as one of Fitzgerald's finest short works.

== Stories ==
The original periodical publication and date are indicated.

- "The Offshore Pirate" (The Saturday Evening Post, May 1, 1920)
- "The Ice Palace"(The Saturday Evening Post, May 22, 1920)
- "Head and Shoulders" (The Saturday Evening Post), February 19, 1920
- "The Cut-Glass Bowl" (Scribner's Magazine), May 1920
- "Bernice Bobs Her Hair" (The Saturday Evening Post), May 1, 1920)
- "Benediction" (The Smart Set, February 1920)
- "Dalyrimple Goes Wrong" (The Smart Set, February 1920)
- "The Four Fists" (Scribner's Magazine, June 1920)

== Background ==
The stories published in the Nassau Literary Review while Fitzgerald was attending Princeton University, as well as those that comprise Flappers and Philosophers, may be placed among his "apprenticeship fiction."

In November 1919, Fitzgerald engaged Harold Ober as his literary agent. By early 1920, Ober had negotiated the sale of six of Fitzgerald's stories to The Saturday Evening Post, one of several "high-paying mass-circulation slick-paper magazines". Fitzgerald was paid $400 for each story. Fitzgerald's short fiction became identified with the Post in the following years, to whom he would sell sixty-five of his stories—"40 percent of his output."

Literary critic and biographer Matthew J. Bruccoli notes that "during his lifetime, Fitzgerald was far better known and more widely read as a short story writer than as a novelist."

== Reception ==
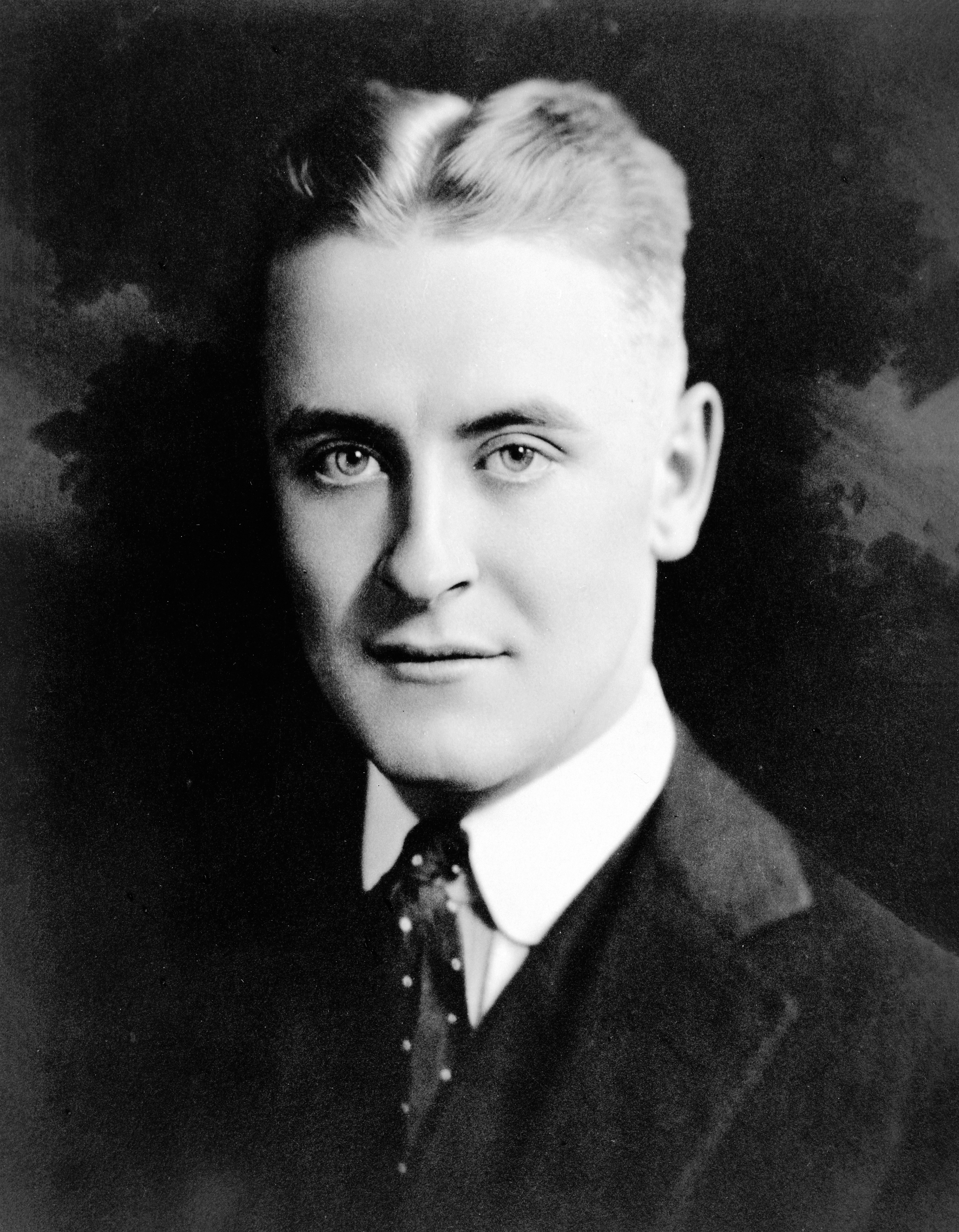
F. Scott Fitzgerald c. 1920.

The New York Times in its September 26, 1920 edition evaluated the collection in light of Fitzgerald's recently published first novel This Side of Paradise (1920): "[H]is eight short stories range the gamut of style and mood with a brilliance, a jeu perle ["pearly tone"], so to speak, which is not to be found in the novel." The reviewer compares the works favorably to the "Russian school" and to the American author O. Henry, and closes by commending "Mr. Fitzgerald's talent and genius."

== Themes ==
Literary critic and biographer John Kuehl reports that the book reflects the social types identified in the collection's title:

Diverse characters and classes manifest themselves, yet Fitzgerald's fundamentally bourgeois world features the ubiquitous homme manqué and the femme fatale, for courtship and marriage comprise the all-important sexual element.
