= Benediction (short story) =

1920 short story by F. Scott Fitzgerald

- Short story by F. Scott Fitzgerald
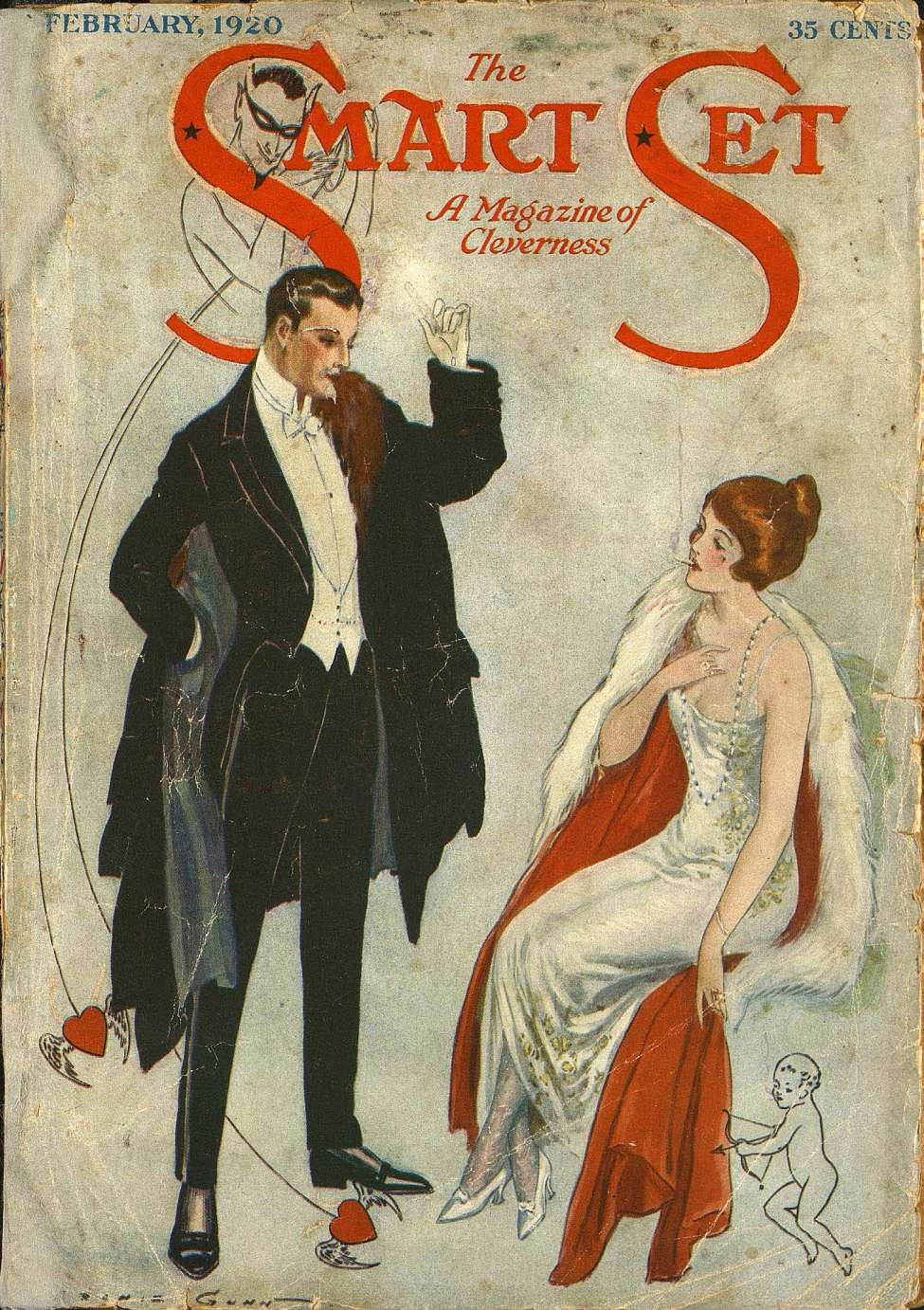
- First published in the February 1920 issue of The Smart Set

Text available at Wikisource
- Country: United States
- Language: English
- Genre: Short story

Publication
- Published in: The Smart Set
- Publication type: Periodical
- Publisher: Smart Set Company, Inc.
- Media type: Print (Magazine, Hardback & Paperback)
- Publication date: February 1, 1920

"Benediction" is a short story by American author F. Scott Fitzgerald, first published in 1920 in the February 1920 issue of The Smart Set. It was republished shortly thereafter in Fitzgerald's short story collection Flappers and Philosophers.

== Plot summary ==
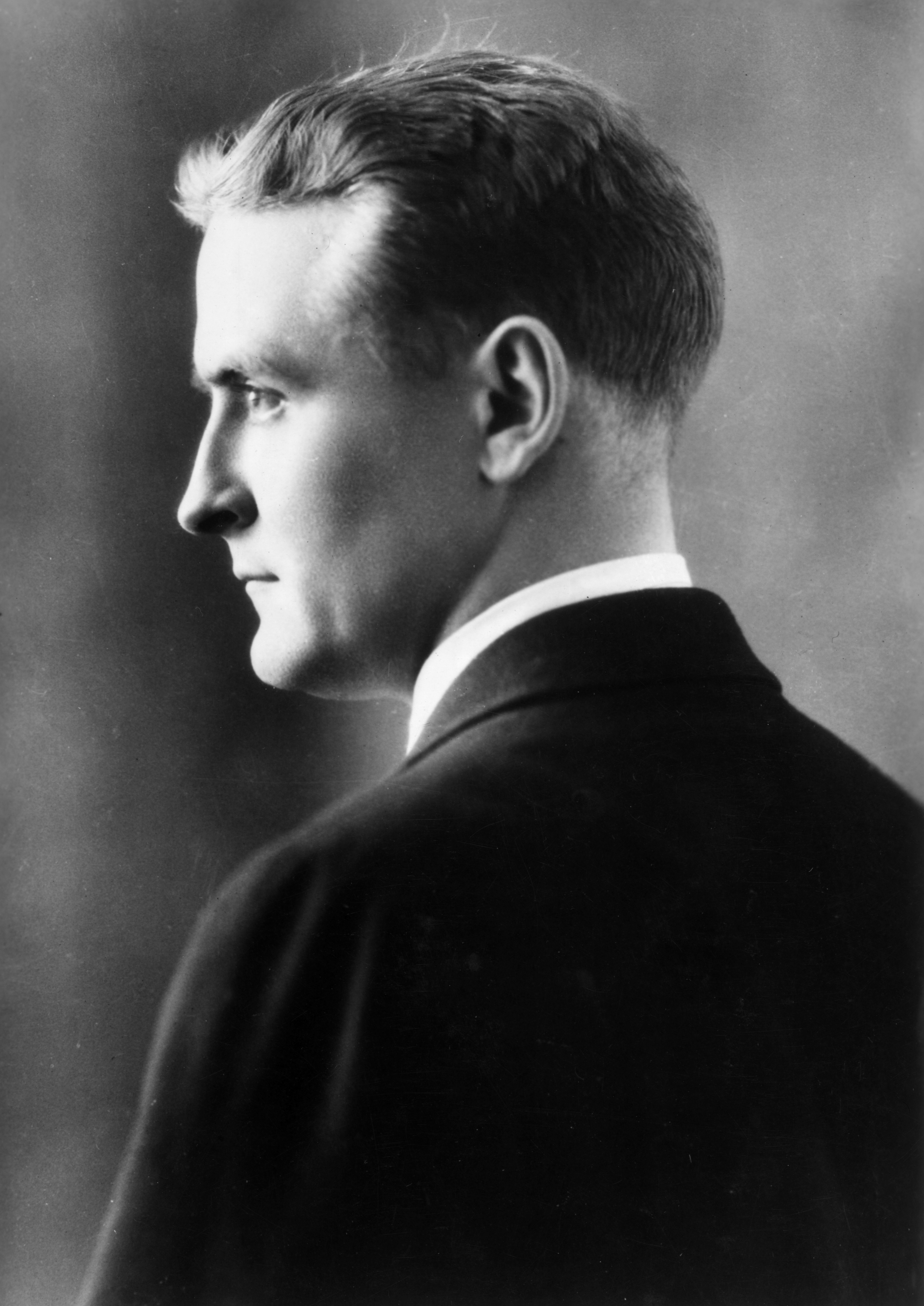
F. Scott Fitzgerald

A young girl, Lois, is on her way to a tryst with her lover, Howard. She stops to meet her much older brother, Kieth [sic], who is in a seminary and about to be ordained as a priest. Lois sends a telegram upon her arrival in Baltimore. She wires Howard that she will meet him after her visit to a seminary.

She arrives by bus and is welcomed by Kieth. He takes her on a tour of the grounds. They have not seen each other for many years. He informs her that he anticipated the meeting between them. They discuss their pasts. She informs him that she is not a devout Catholic. She tells him: "It really doesn't seem to apply anymore."

Lois participates in a benediction or blessing in the chapel with her brother. She is overcome by the experience and collapses into his arms. She undergoes an emotional catharsis.

Kieth bids her farewell and sees her off as she departs by bus. After her departure, he prays before the pietà. When she arrives back at the station, she tears up a telegram she meant to send. The clerks read the discarded message: "This is in the way of a permanent goodbye. I should suggest Italy. Lois."

== Publication history ==
The story first appeared in The Smart Set, edited by H.L. Mencken and George Jean Nathan, in the February 1920 issue. The short story was included in his 1920 anthology Flappers and Philosophers later that year, consisting of eight stories, published by Scribner's.

== Critical analysis ==
When Mencken reviewed Fitzgerald's story collection Flappers and Philosophers, he regarded "Benediction" as the best story in the anthology and wrote that its publication "brought down the maledictions of the Jesuits and came near getting the magazine barred from the Knights of Columbus camp-libraries."
