= Tender as Hellfire =

1999 novel by Joe Meno

- First edition cover
- Author: Joe Meno
- Publisher: St. Martin's Press
- Publication date: March 11, 1999
- ISBN: 0-312-20051-X

Tender as Hellfire is a debut novel by Chicago author Joe Meno, published in 1999. Meno limns a near-fantastical world of trailer park floozies, broken-down '76 Impalas, lost glass eyes, and the daily experiences of two boys trying to make sense of their random, sharp lives.

== Plot summary ==
Dough and Pill are brothers bound by more than blood. The anguish of their past, the terror of their present, and the uncertainty of their future all underscore the only truth that is within their grasp: each other. For beneath the cruel surface of their trailer park community lies a menagerie of odd characters, each one strange yet somehow beautiful, including Val, the blowsy bottle-blonde who shows surprising maternal instincts when the boys need it most, and El Rey del Perdito, the "Undisputed King of the Tango," a widower who dances nightly, imagining his wife in his arms, as Dough peers through the window contemplating a love that seems not to die. Surrounded by the strange and displaced, Dough and Pill must navigate through a world of constant pain and confusion. Finding beauty in unexpected places and maintaining reverence for hard-won scars, these two brothers learn, finally, that even broken things can be perfect.
