= Punk Planet =

American punk zine (1994–2007)

- Categories: Music magazine
- First issue: May 1994; 32 years ago
- Final issue Number: July 2007; 19 years ago 80
- Country: United States
- Based in: Chicago
- Language: English
- Website: www.punkplanet.com
- OCLC: 35200841

Punk Planet was a 16,000 print run punk zine, based in Chicago, Illinois, that focused most of its energy on looking at punk subculture rather than punk as simply another genre of music to which teenagers listen. In addition to covering music, Punk Planet also covered visual arts and a wide variety of progressive issues — including media criticism, feminism, and labor issues.

The most notable features in Punk Planet were the interviews and album reviews. The interviews generally ran two or three pages, and tended to focus on the motivations of the artist (or organizer, activist, or whoever) being interviewed. Punk Planet aimed to be more inclusive than the well-known zine Maximum Rock and Roll, and tried to review nearly all the records it received, so long as the record label wasn't owned or partially owned by a major label. This led to a review section typically longer than thirty pages, covering a variety of musical styles. Although much of the music thus reviewed was, expectedly, aggressive rock, the reviews also covered country, folk, hip-hop, indie rock, and other genres. The Punk Planet reviews section also encompassed independently released comics, zines, and DVDs.

A number of poor distribution deals and the collapse of the Independent Press Association resulted in mounting debts for the editors. As a result, issue 80 was shipped with a cover reading: "This is the final issue of Punk Planet, after this the fight is yours." Subsidiary business Punk Planet books remains in business.

== History and other projects ==
The first issue of the zine was published in May 1994, in part as a response to the perception that Maximum Rock and Roll was becoming too elitist. In September 2006, Punk Planet had printed 75 issues of their bi-monthly publication, and in the fall of 2004 launched a book publishing arm, Punk Planet Books, in conjunction with the New York-based small press Akashic Books. Punk Planet Books has published four titles as of May 2006: "Hairstyles of the Damned" by Joe Meno (August 2004, ISBN 1-888451-70-X), “All the Power: Revolution Without Illusion” by Mark Andersen (September 2004, ISBN 1-888451-72-6), “Lessons in Taxidermy” by Bee Lavender (March 2005, ISBN 1-888451-79-3), and "100 Posters, 134 Squirrels" by Jay Ryan (November 2005, ISBN 1-888451-93-9).

In September 2006, Punk Planet partnered with the website, ZineWiki, to publish, online, exclusive articles from past print issues.

On June 18, 2007, a post at www.punkplanet.com informed the public that after 13 years and 80 issues, Punk Planet's final issue was being sent out. The reasoning pointed to "bad distribution deals, disappearing advertisers, and a decreasing audience of subscribers."

As a result, editor Dan Sinker decided to place his focus on the online website, but it has since gone offline. In its place is a statement, "This is it, folks. The Punk Planet website is closed. Two years after the closure of the magazine, it just seemed time."

In January 2021, all 80 issues of Punk Planet were uploaded to the Internet Archive.
