= Bluebirds Used to Croon in the Choir: Stories =

First edition (publ. TriQuarterly)

Bluebirds Used to Croon the Choir: Stories is a jazzy collection of short stories and little moments from genre-hopping Chicago author Joe Meno. Released by Planet Punk books in 2005.

== Plot summary ==
The books starts with "The Use of Medicine," about a pair of kids using an old bottle of belladonna and a hypodermic they find among their father's medical supplies to drug little animals.

"In the Arms of Someone You Love" is set in revolutionary Cuba, where a man worries about losing his wife to a dashing magician. The city erupts in violence, and the man makes a devilish barter for the sake of love, a move that takes this tale out of the realm of magical realism and into that of high romantic fantasy.

More mundane matters prevail in such stories as "Mr. Song," which portrays a cad who pays the aged crooner in the apartment next door to sing ballads through the thin walls as a way of setting the mood, and "I'll Be Your Sailor," in which a schlemiel carries on a benighted affair with a woman in his apartment building who works at a themed fast-food restaurant and has a hockey-loving brute for an uncaring husband.

"A Trip to Greek Mythology Camp" is a painfully comic scenario about a summer camp full of socially awkward kids who assume that in numbers they will find acceptance.
