= Demons in the Spring =

Collection of short stories by Joe Meno

First edition

Demons in the Spring is a collection of twenty short stories by Chicago author Joe Meno, with each story illustrated by a different artist, including Charles Burns, Archer Prewitt, Ivan Brunetti, Jay Ryan, Paul Hornschemeier, Anders Nilsen, Geoff McFedtridge, Kelsey Brookes, Kim Hiorthoy, Chris Uphues, Caroline Hwang, Rachell Sumpter, kozyndan, Evan Hecox, and Cody Hudson. The book was a finalist for the 2008 The Story Prize, alongside Tobias Wolff and Jhumpa Lahiri.

Meno's second collection of short work, it was originally issued as a limited edition of 4,000 by Akashic Books in 2008. A paperback edition by Akashic Books was published in 2010. A portion of proceeds from both editions was donated to 826 Chicago.

The stories explore depression, loneliness and insanity, and feature characters who are "misfits at odds with the world or with themselves".

Kirkus Reviews called it an "inspired collection of 20 stories, brilliant in its command of tone and narrative perspective", and also praised the illustrations.

MAKE Literary Magazine said that "There is magic in the type of melancholy that Meno dishes out" and noted that "Meno’s sentences, like Vonnegut’s, are simple, poignant, and playful".

in Vol 1 Brooklyn, Tobias Carroll found that "there’s an outstretched intimacy to the best of these stories, an emotional rawness expanded by Meno’s rational, yearning prose", and concluded that "for all that Meno creates memorable characters, it may be that his true strength is in documenting their interactions, in sketching out the bonds — extant or broken, familial or emotional — that unite disparate lives".

== List of stories and contributing artists ==
1. "Frances the Ghost" (illustration by Charles Burns)
2. "Stockholm 1973" (illustration by Evan Hecox)
3. "An Apple Could Make You Laugh" (illustration by Geoff McFetridge)
4. "It Is Romance" (illustration by Ivan Brunetti)
5. "The Sound before the End of the World" (illustration by Kim Hiorthøy)
6. "Animals in the Zoo" (illustration by Jay Ryan)
7. "People Are Becoming Clouds" (illustration by Nick Butcher)
8. "Ghost Plane" (illustration by Jon Resh)
9. "What a Schoolgirl You Are" (illustration by Kelsey Brookes)
10. "Miniature Elephants Are Popular" (illustration by Todd Baxter)
11. "The Boy Who Was a Chirping Oriole" (illustration by Archer Prewitt)
12. "I Want the Quiet Moments of a Party Girl" (illustration by Caroline Hwang)
13. "The Architecture of the Moon" (illustration by Souther Salazar)
14. "The Unabomber and My Brother" (illustration by Cody Hudson)
15. "Art School is Boring So" (illustration by Steph Davidson)
16. "Oceanland" (illustration by Anders Nilsen)
17. "Get Well, Seymour!" (illustration by Paul Hornshemeier)
18. "Iceland Today" (illustration by Rachell Sumpter)
19. "Airports of Light" (illustration by kozyndan)
20. "Winter at the World-Famous Ice Hotel" (illustration by Laura Owens)
