= The Great Perhaps =

2009 novel by Joe Meno

- Author: Joe Meno
- Language: English
- Genre: Drama
- Publisher: W. W. Norton & Company
- Publication date: May 11, 2009
- Publication place: USA
- Pages: 414
- ISBN: 0-393-06796-3

The Great Perhaps is the fifth novel by Joe Meno. It was a winner of the Great Lakes Book Award for Fiction in 2009 and a New York Times Book Review Editor's Choice.

According to Publishers Weekly: "Meno's handle on the written word is fresh and inviting, conjuring a story that delves deeply into the human heart."
