= William Ely Hill =

American cartoonist and illustrator

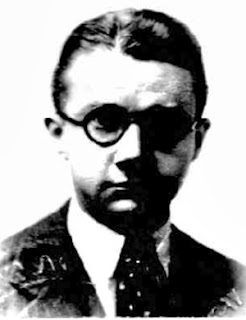
- Hill in 1918
- Born: January 17, 1887; Binghamton, New York, U.S.
- Died: December 9, 1962 (aged 75); Danbury, Connecticut, U.S.
- Resting place: Spring Forest Cemetery; Binghamton, New York, U.S.
- Education: Amherst College
- Known for: Illustration
- Notable work: My Wife and My Mother-in-Law (1915); Among Us Mortals (1916-1922)

William Ely Hill (January 17, 1887 – December 9, 1962) was an American cartoonist and illustrator active in the first half of the 20th century. He is best known for his weekly full-page illustration series "Among Us Mortals" published in the New York Tribune from 1916 to 1922, and for creating the most popular iteration of the optical illusion My Wife and My Mother-in-Law (1915).

== Biography ==
William Hill was born in Binghamton, New York on January 19, 1887, to Marietta (Ely) and William Hill. Their only child, he would go on to graduate from Storm King School and Amherst College. While in school, he was inducted as a member of the Chi Phi fraternity on October 24, 1905.

On June 11, 1918, Hill applied for a passport, stating his purpose was to "gather material for sketches." His employer at the time, the New York Tribune, sent him with a note on company letterhead that insisted Hill was a unique talent whom the paper desperately needed to send abroad to capture the American war effort. The passport office appears to have agreed as Hill was allowed to travel, eventually resulting in war-based pieces making up a large portion of his portfolio.

Hill was a signatory of The Greenwich Village Bookshop Door, a sort-of "who's who" of Greenwich Village's creative scene from 1921 to 1925. Rescued from the demolition of Floyd Dell's home in 1921, the bright red door found new life at a 4 Christopher Street bookshop (Frank Shay's Bookshop) where it was repainted and became a makeshift autograph book for the over 200 authors, artists, poets, and creatives who passed through the shop. Hill's signature can be found on the second panel of the front of the door, near the signatures of Alexander Popini, Hendrick Willem van Loon, Charles R. Macaulay, and Oscar Cesare. The Greenwich Village Bookshop Door is held by the Harry Ransom Center at the University of Texas at Austin.

William Ely Hill died at Danbury Hospital in Danbury, Connecticut on December 9, 1962, at the age of 75. He is buried at Spring Forest Cemetery in his hometown of Binghamton, New York.

== Career ==
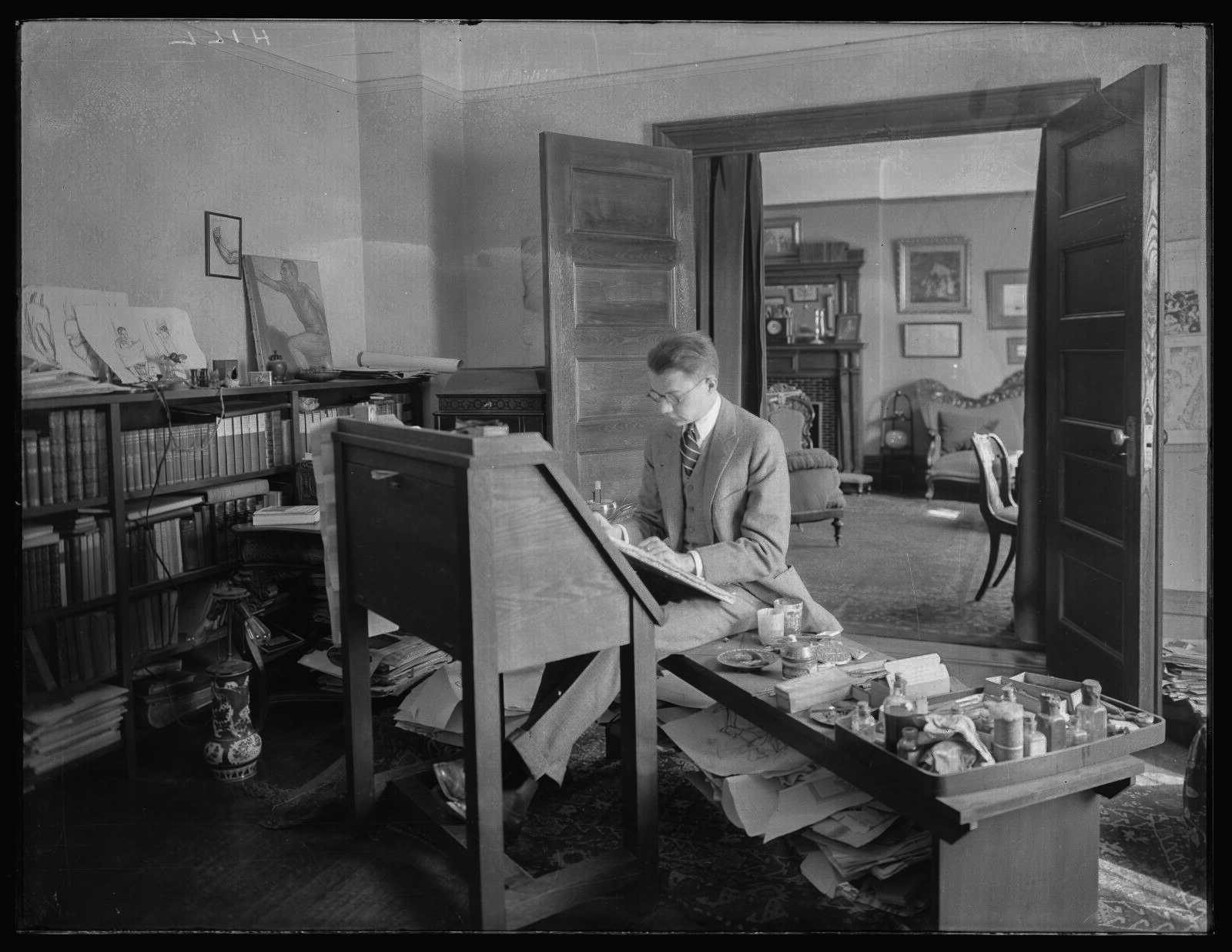
W. E. Hill in his home studio

Best known for his satirical illustrations of everyday people, the preface to the 1917 collection of Hill's work said:

"Hill is popular, by which I mean universal, because you think his pictures look like somebody you know, like Eddie, or Marjorie, or Aunt Em. But they don’t; they look like you. Or if you prefer, like me. He is popular because he draws the folks everybody knows."

— Franklin P. Adams, Preface-to-the-preface, Among Us Mortals (1917)

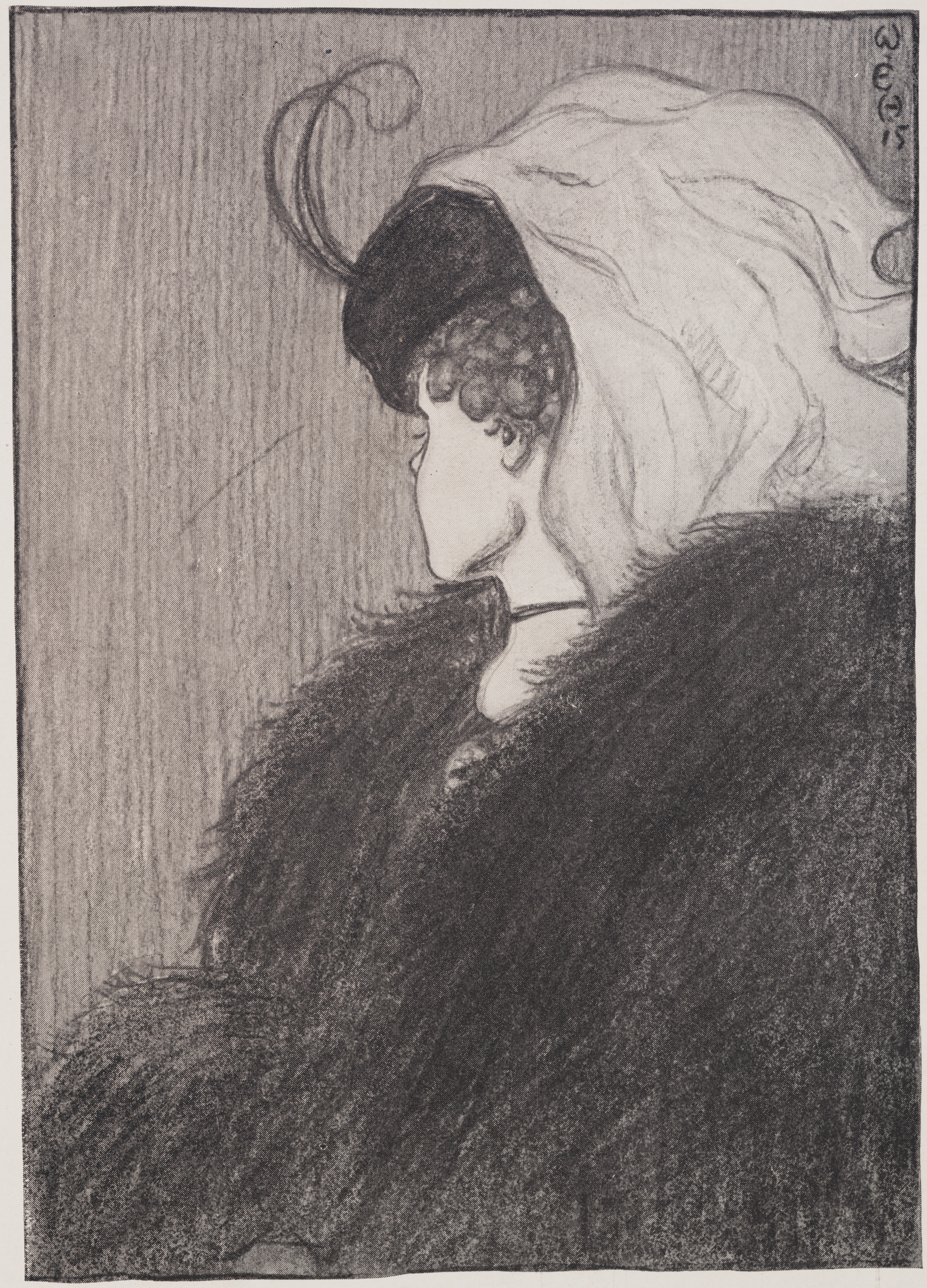
My Wife and My Mother-in-Law, Hill for Puck, 1915

Originally drawn for humor magazine Puck, Hill's illustration My Wife and My Mother-in-Law from 1915 remains an excellent example of an optically ambiguous image. When viewed from one angle you see a young woman wearing a necklace and facing away; from the other, an old woman in a veil, looking downward. Though he was inspired by an 1888 postcard and thus did not invent the design, Hill's version of the illustration is the one that became popular. Over a hundred years later, psychology textbooks still include his drawing and pop magazines use it for personality quizzes.

=== Puck Covers ===
For the first half of the 1910s, W.E. Hill designed illustrations for the cover of Puck magazine, the American answer to Punch. A 1912 article from his hometown newspaper, The Bingamton Press, reported that London-based Vanity Fair had commented on Hill's talent for the covers in a then-recent publication.

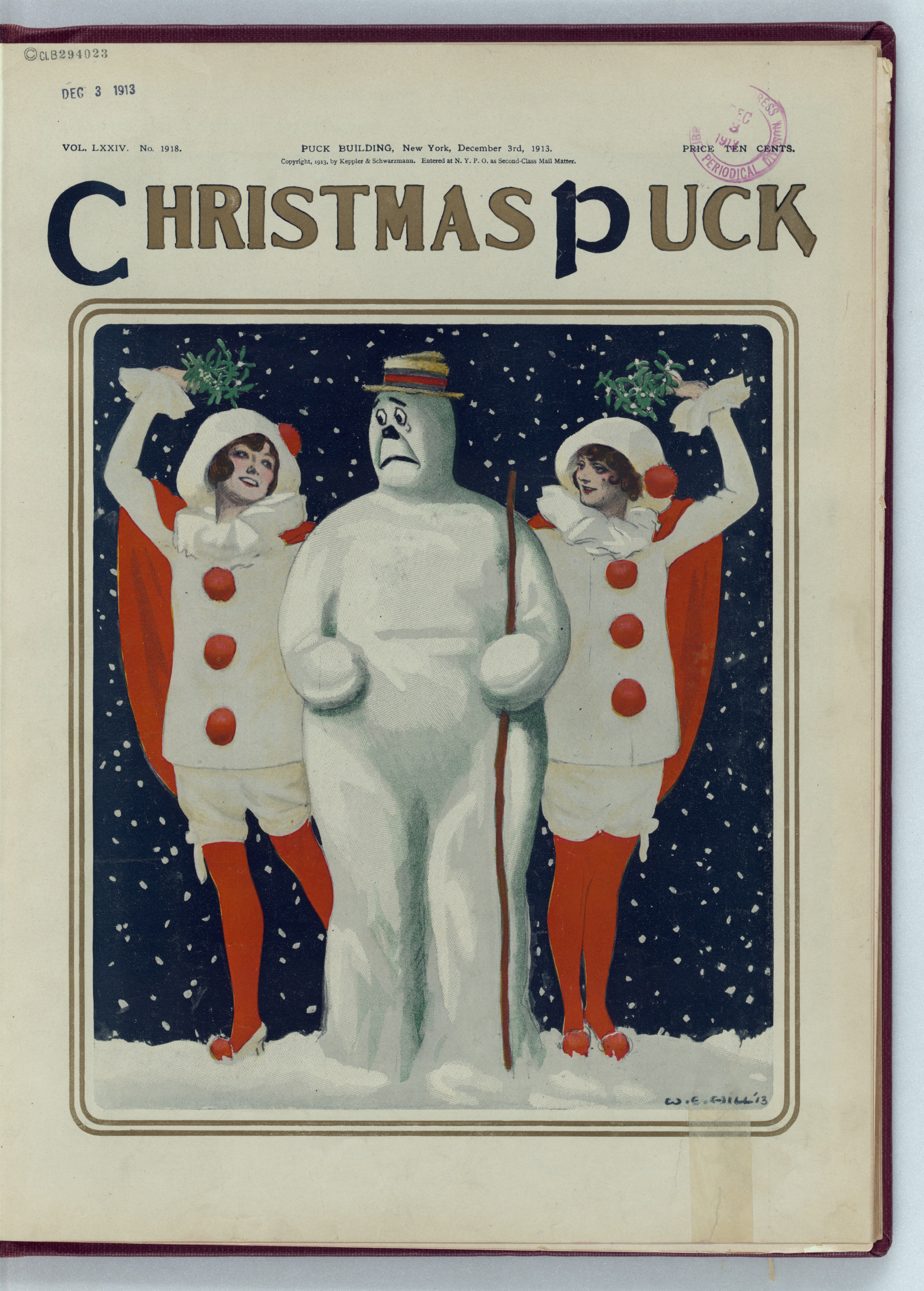
Christmas, Puck v. 74, Hill, December 3, 1913

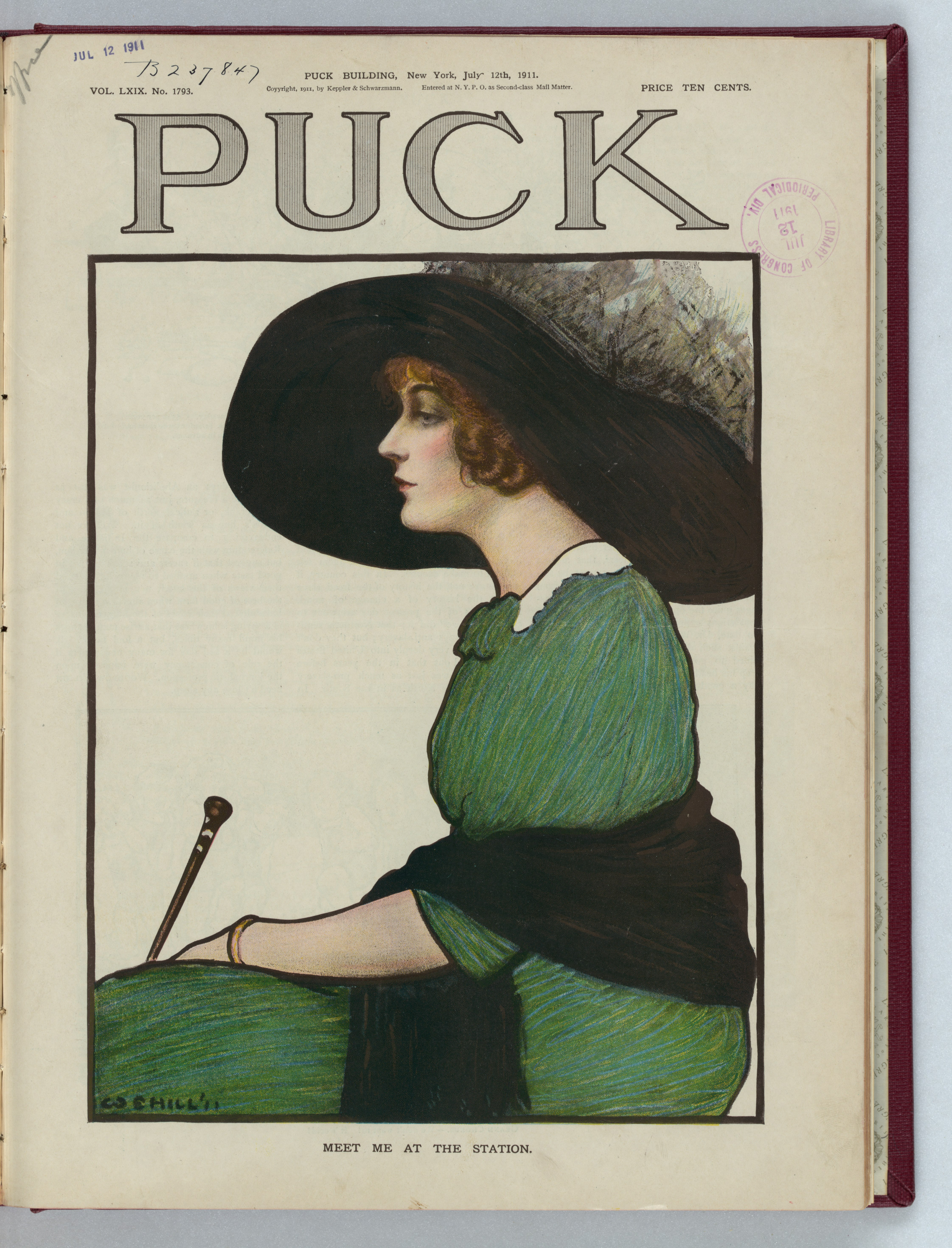
Meet Me At The Station, Puck v. 69, July 12, 1911

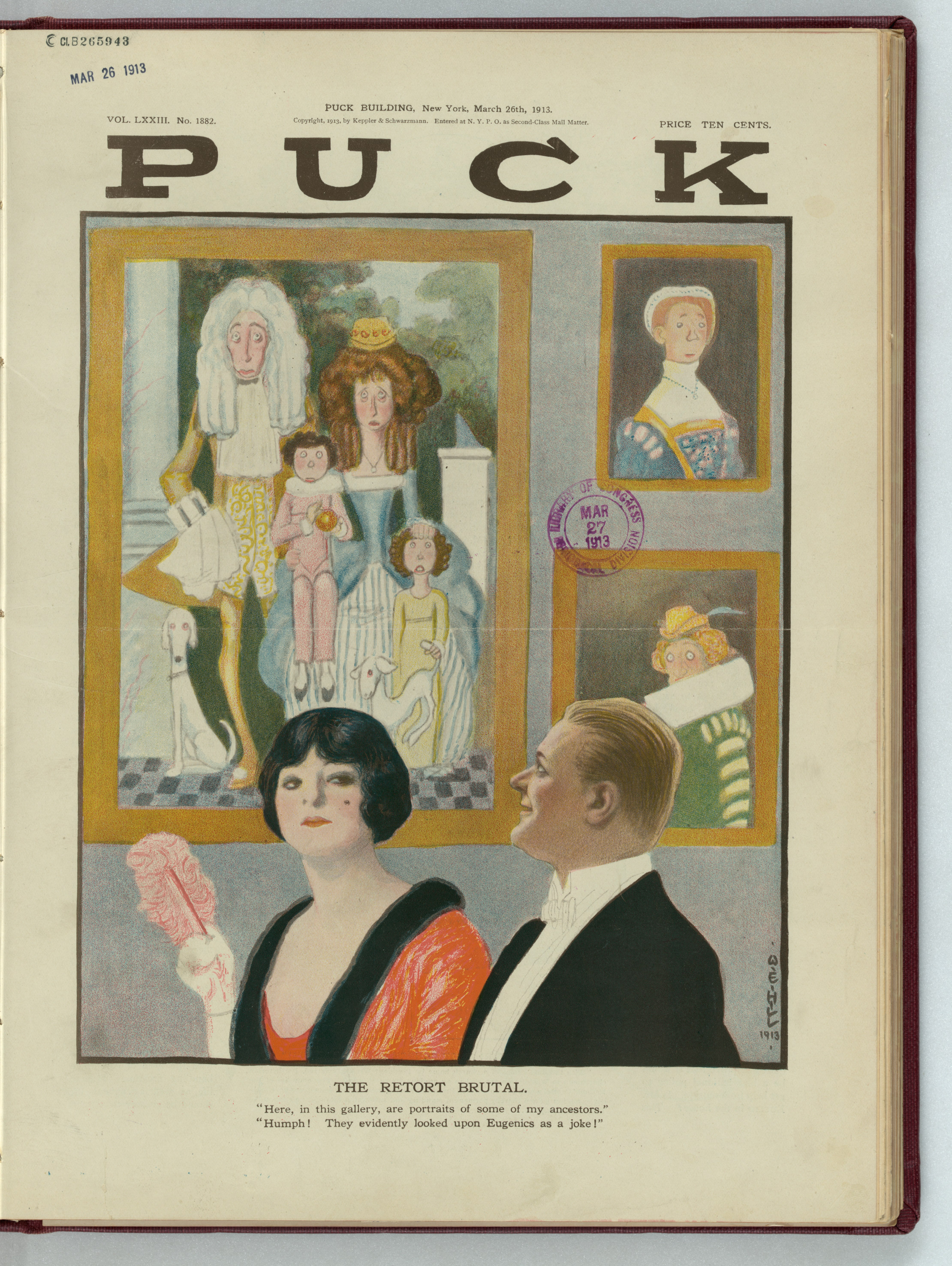
The Retort Brutal, Puck v. 73, March 26, 1913

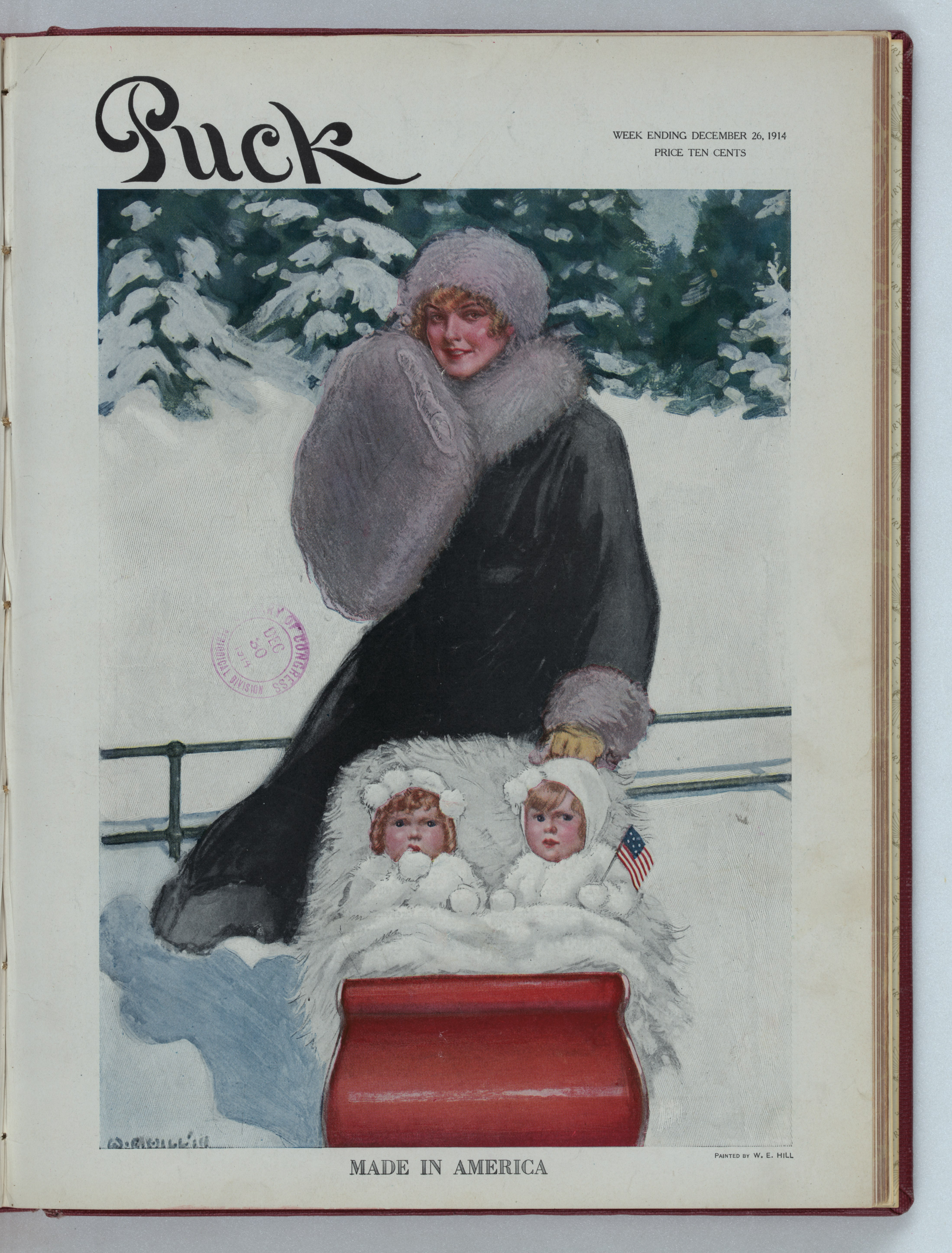
Made in America, Puck v. 76, December 26, 1914

=== Fitzgerald Dust Jackets ===
Hill was responsible for the dust jacket illustrations on the first editions of F. Scott Fitzgerald's first three books: This Side of Paradise and Flappers and Philosophers in 1920 and The Beautiful and Damned two years later in 1922. Fitzgerald apparently did not like that Hill's designs were beginning to look like him and Zelda by the third book, so he asked his editor Maxwell Perkins to find someone new for the job.

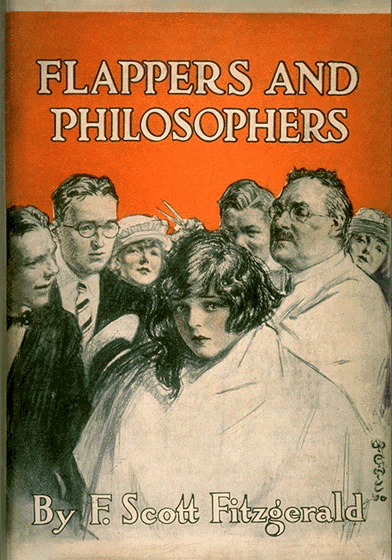
Flappers and Philosophers by F. Scott Fitzgerald, cover by W.E. Hill, 1920

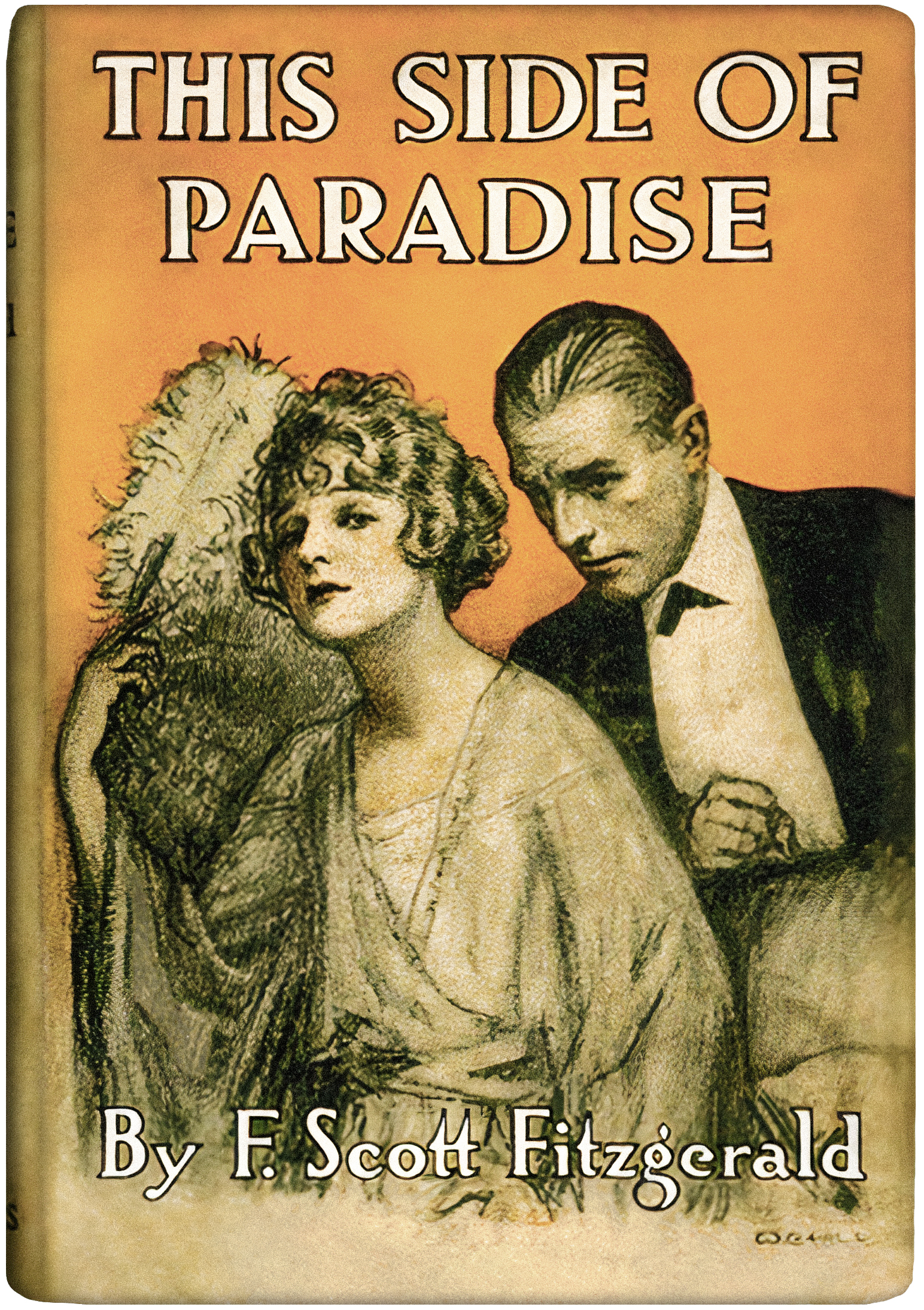
This Side of Paradise by F. Scott Fitzgerald, cover by W.E. Hill, 1920

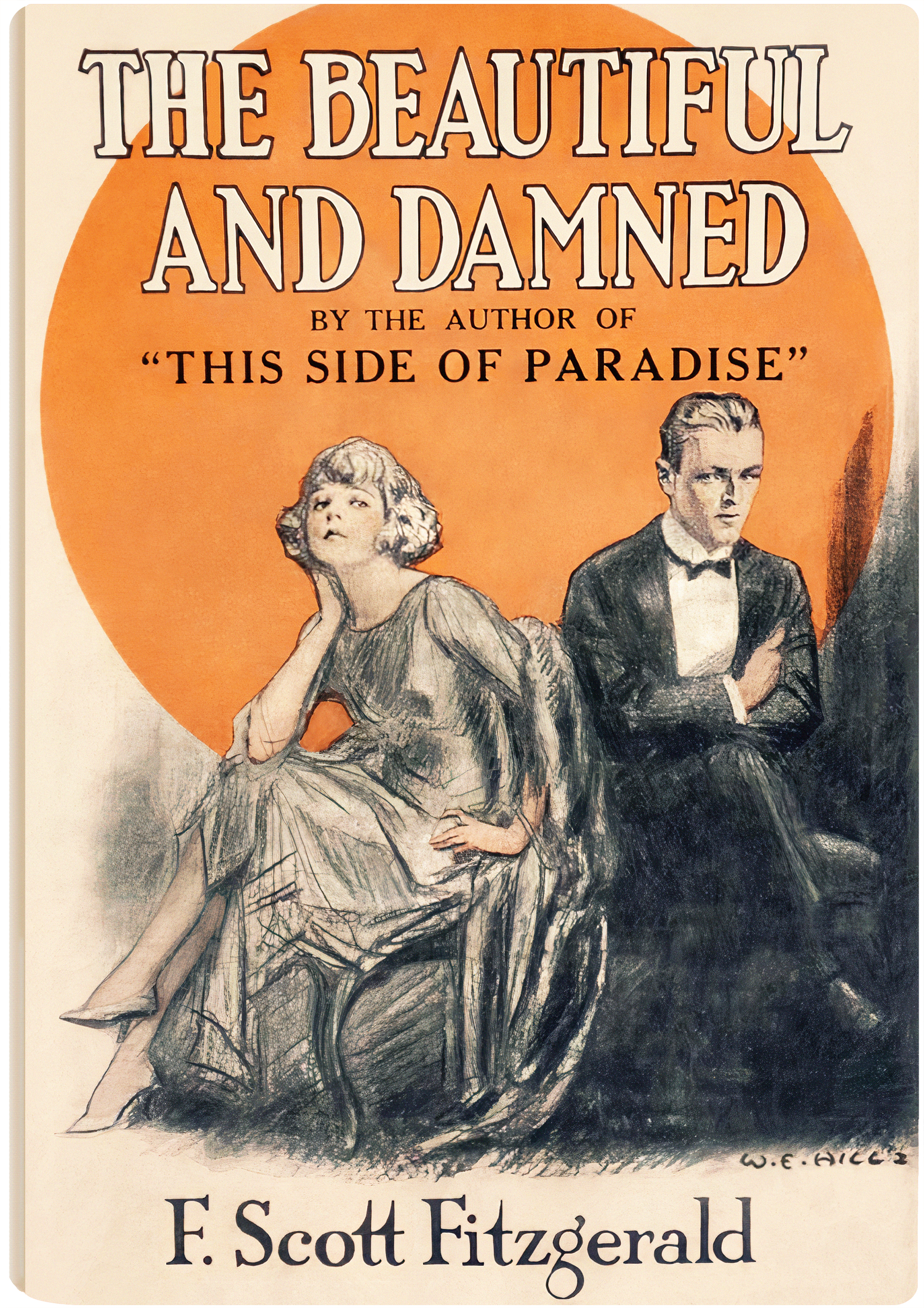
The Beautiful and Damned by F. Scott Fitzgerald, cover by W.E. Hill, 1922

== Among Us Mortals ==
=== The Books ===
In 1917, the Houghton Mifflin Company published a 150-page collection of illustrations by W. E. Hill with accompanying text by Franklin P. Adams titled "Among Us Mortals: Pictures and Legends by W. E. Hill." The book features 12 chapters that serve as organizational themes for collections of illustrations, titled in order: The Amateur Vaudeville, The Movies, The Burlesque Show, Afternoon Tea Hour, Modern Art, The Senior Hop, Summer People, War Stuff, The Apartment House, Opening Night, The Fraternity Banquet, and Christmas. Many illustrations initially published in the book would eventually be published in Hill's weekly illustration column. Following the success of his first book, Hill published "Among Us Cats" with Harper and Brothers on November 5, 1926. This book featured cat-focused cartoons, several in full color.

Among Us Mortals cover

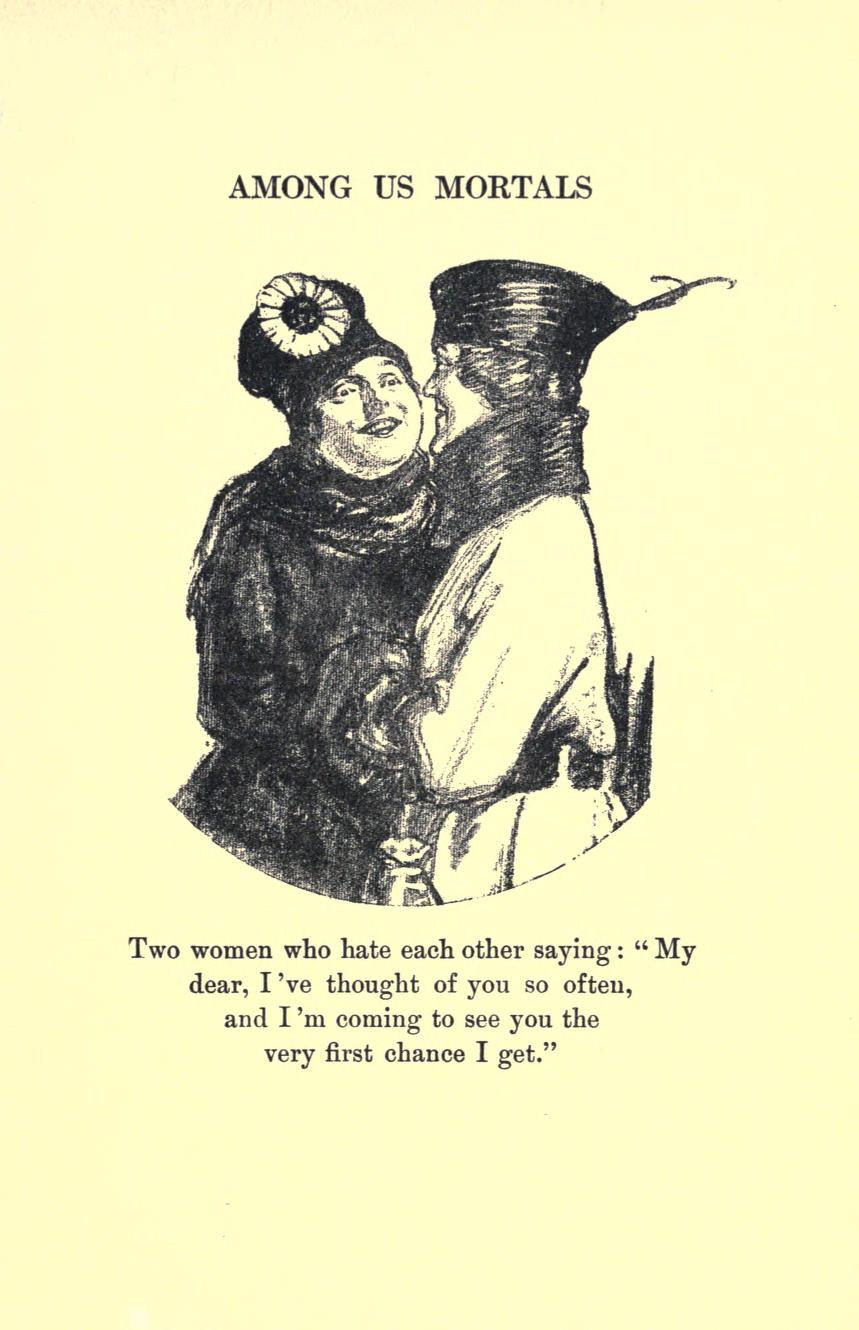
"Two women who hate each other saying "My dear! I've thought of you so often...," Among Us Mortals p. 17

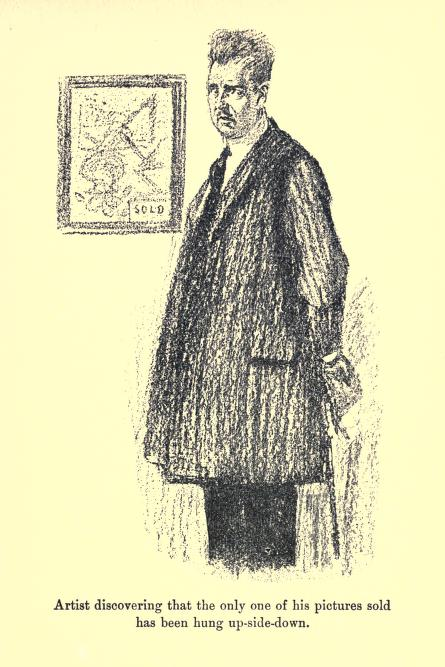
"Artist discovering the only one of his pictures sold has been hung upside down," Among Us Mortals p. 70

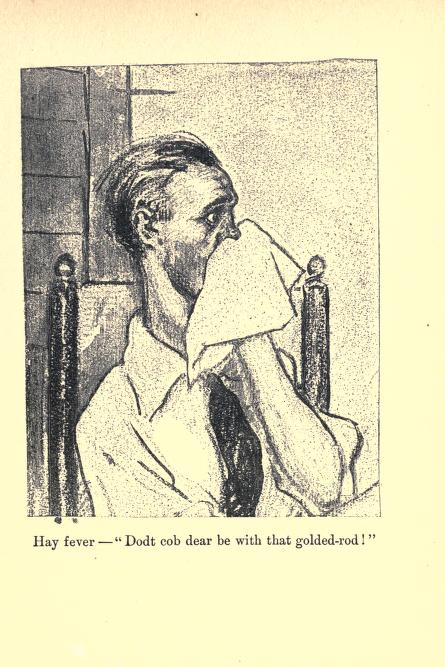
"Hay fever - dobt cob dear be with that goldenrod!," Among Us Mortals p. 94

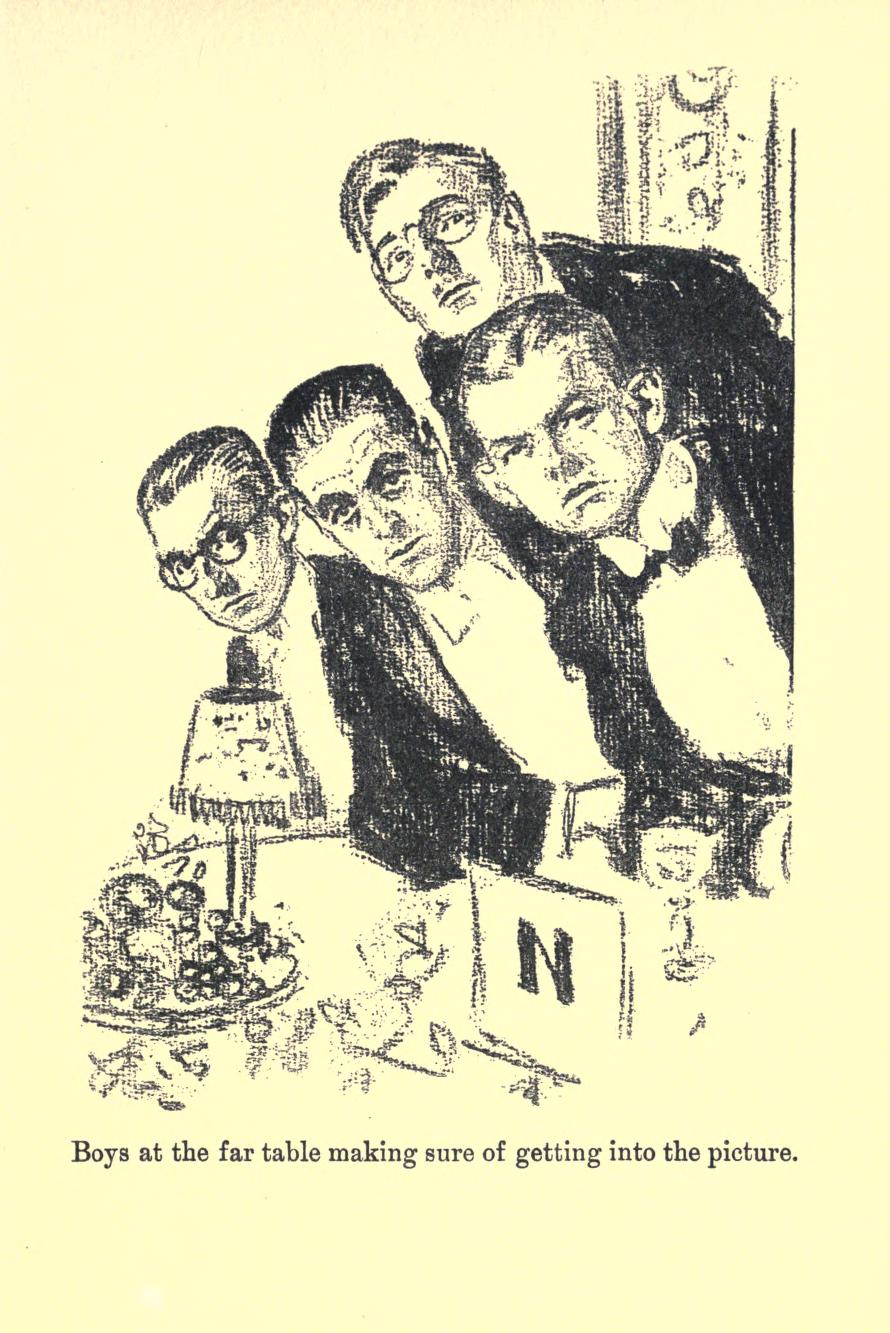
"Boys at the far table making sure of getting into the picture," Among Us Mortals p.146

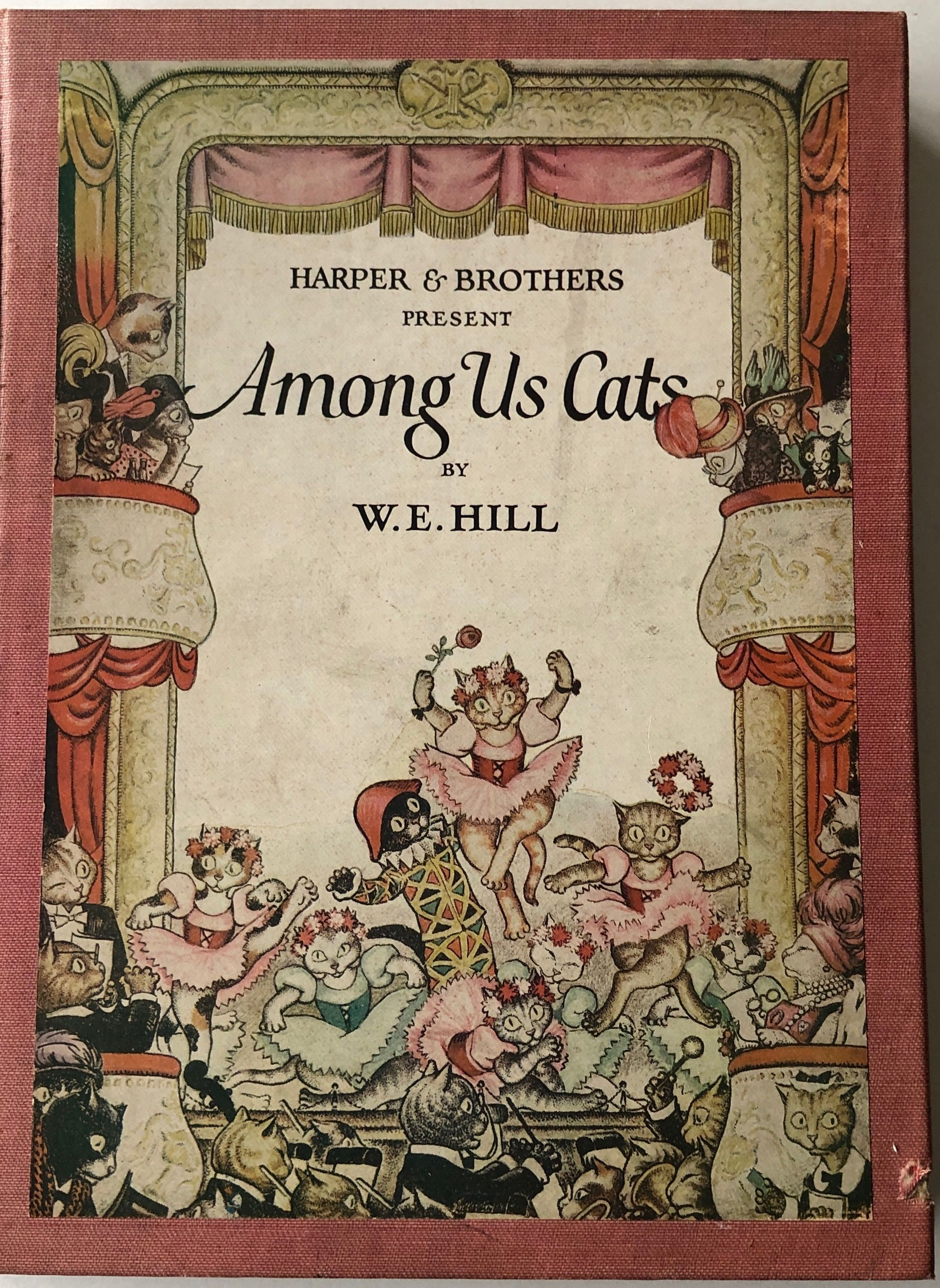
Among Us Cats cover

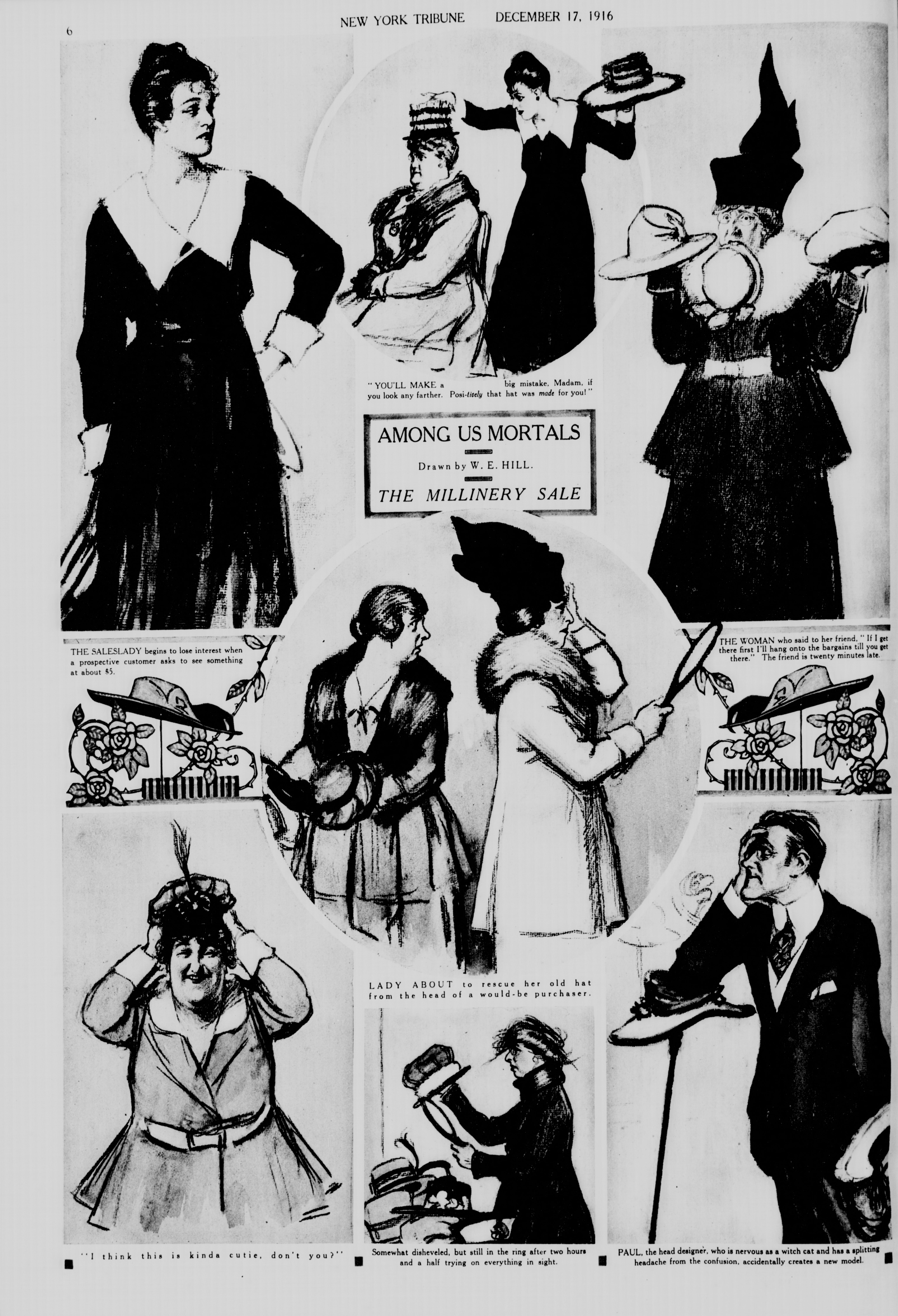
The Millinery Sale full page, W.E. Hill, New York Tribune, December 17, 1916

=== Weekly Series ===
Hill began publishing satirical illustrations of everyday people in the New York Tribune on April 9, 1916, with his first small cartoon. Just a few weeks later on April 23 of that year, his work was picked up for a weekly series titled "Among Us Mortals" that ran until an abrupt end six years later on May 14, 1922. Highly successful at the time, the series has been largely forgotten in the decades since. Many Americans living abroad at the end of World War I treasured "Among Us Mortals" for how much it reminded them of home, with countless letters to the editor sent in thanks to the New York Tribune for running the collection.

Every Sunday, a full-page of Hill's themed illustrations was published in the New York Tribune and, after 1917, The Washington Times. Everyday themes of the week included The Medical Profession, Men's Business Lunch, The Intellectuals, The Soda Fountain, The Millinery Sale, The Suburban Station, and dozens more. Occasionally Hill published "Among Us Mortals" pages with more specific or entertainment-based themes, like The War Play, The Sudden Shower, The Poetry of Motion, By The Sad Sea Waves, The Amateur Vaudeville, The Ladies' Choral Club, and Between The Acts.

Dozens of "Among Us Mortals" spreads from both The Washington Times and the New York Tribune have been preserved by the Library of Congress's Chronicling America project for online viewing.

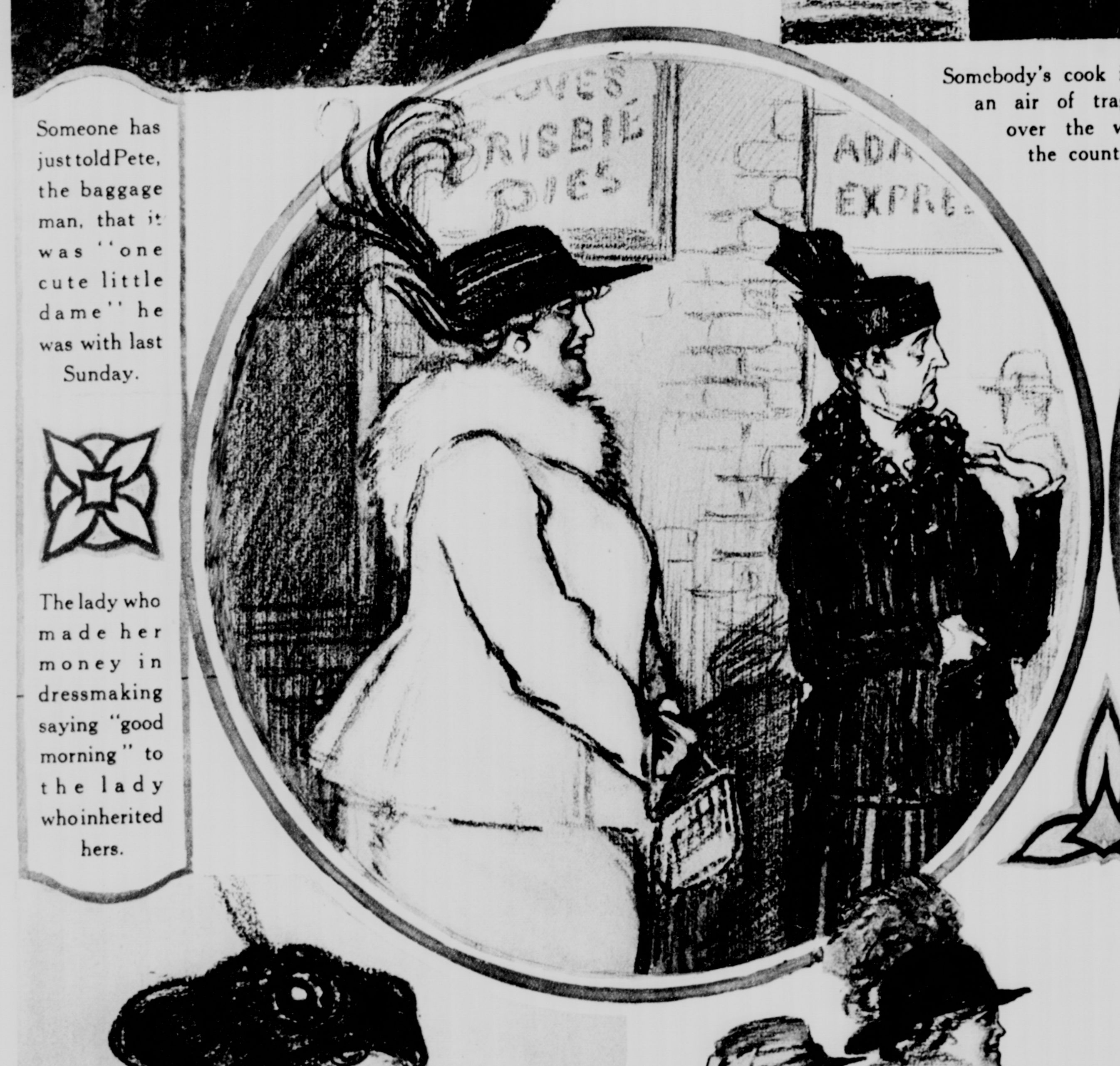
"The lady who made her money in dressmaking saying "good morning" to the lady who inherited hers," The Millinery Sale, November 5th, 1916

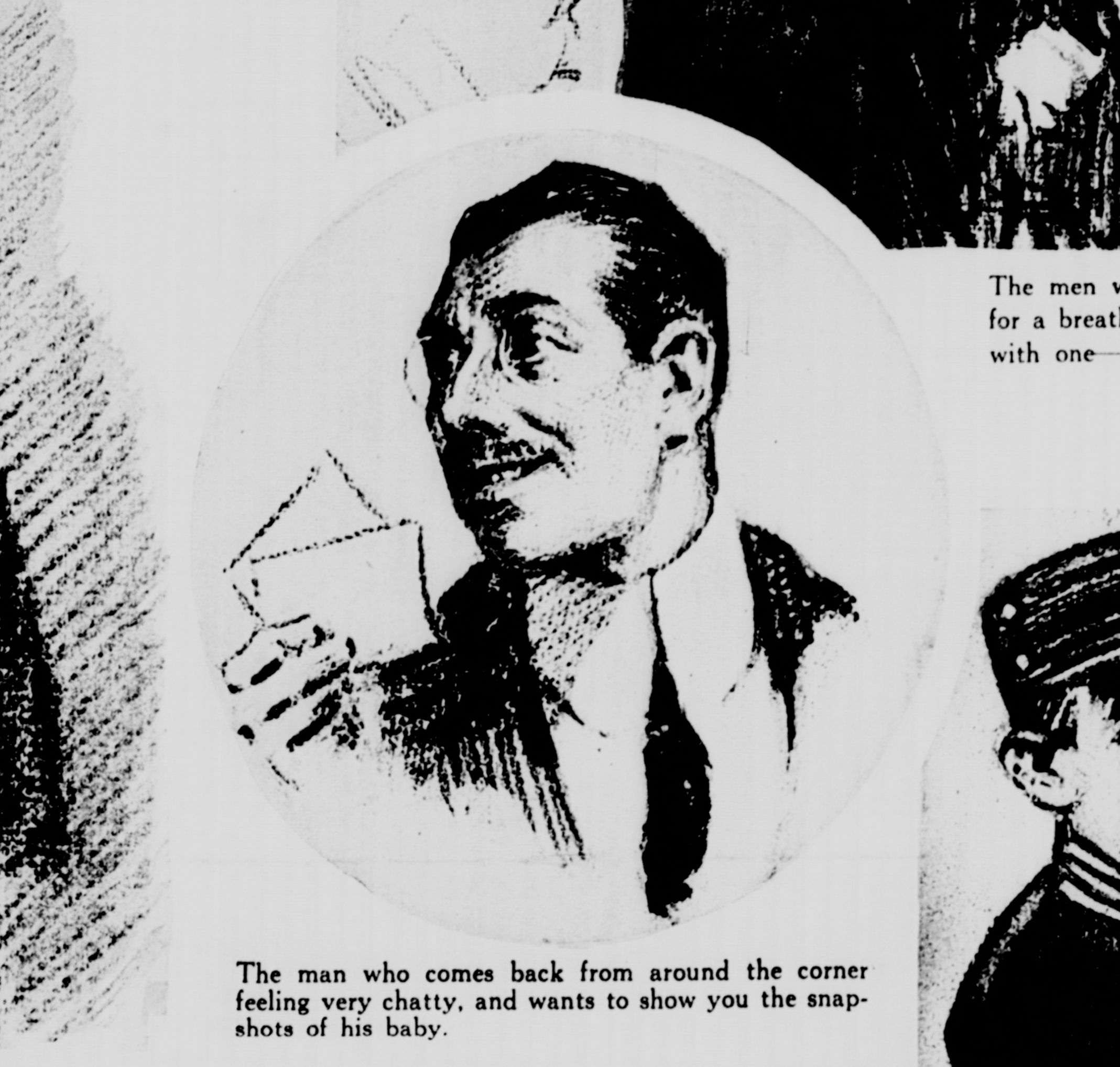
"The man who comes back...and wants to show you snapshots of his baby," Between The Acts, June 17, 1917

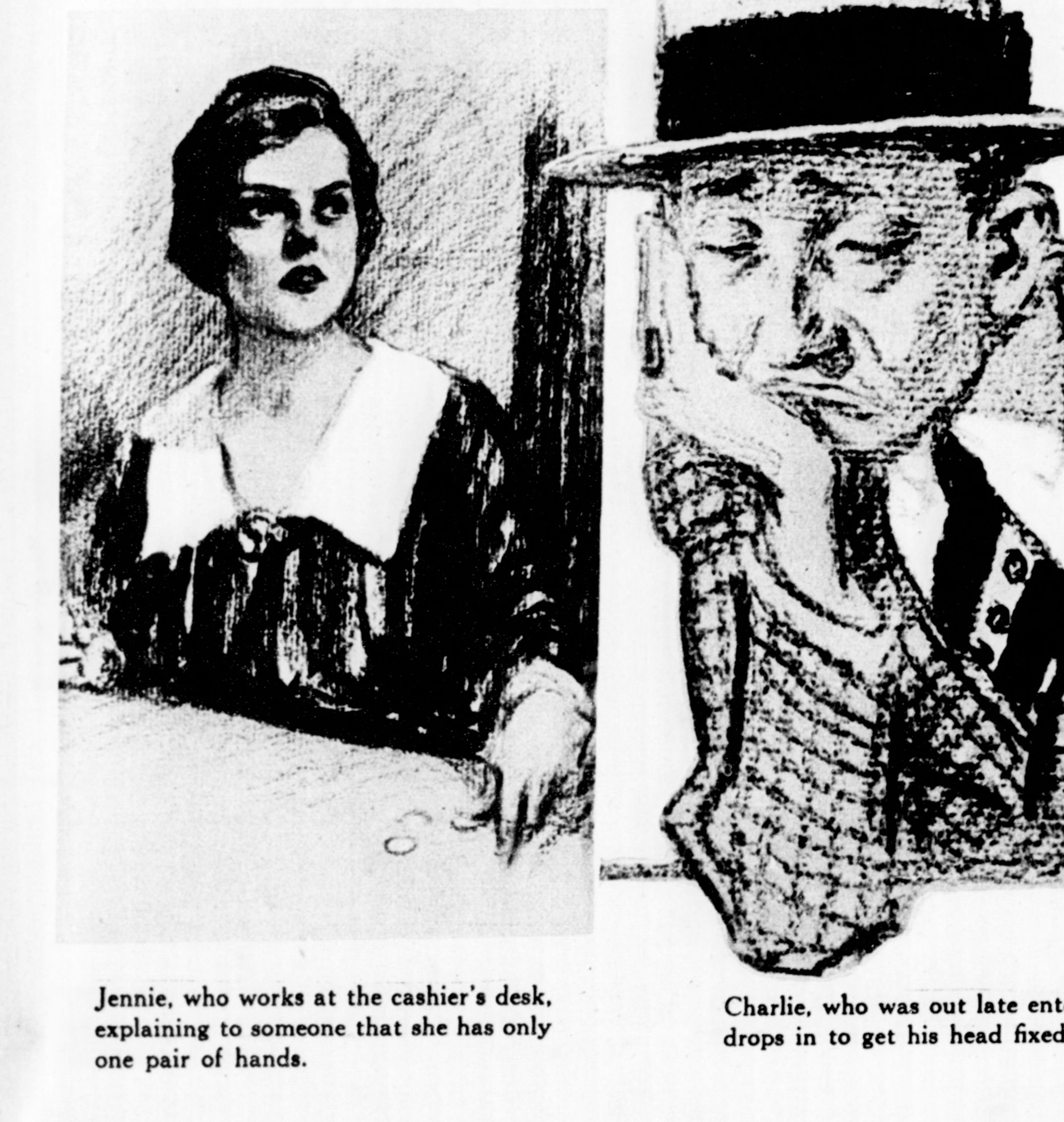
"Jennie, who works at the cashier's desk, explaining to someone that she only has one pair of hands," The Soda Fountain, August 12, 1917

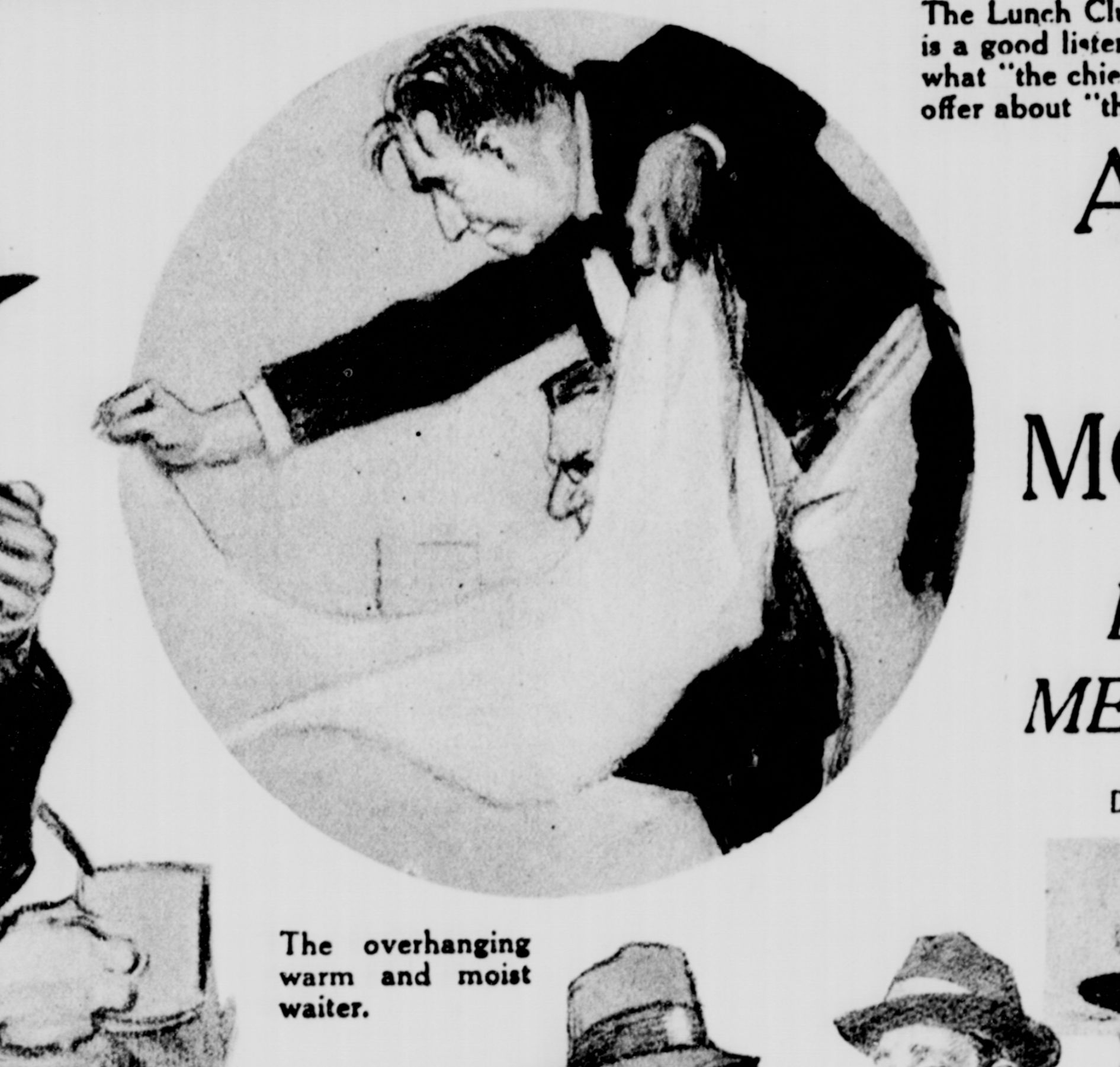
"The overhanging warm and moist waiter," Men's Business Lunch, October 28, 1917

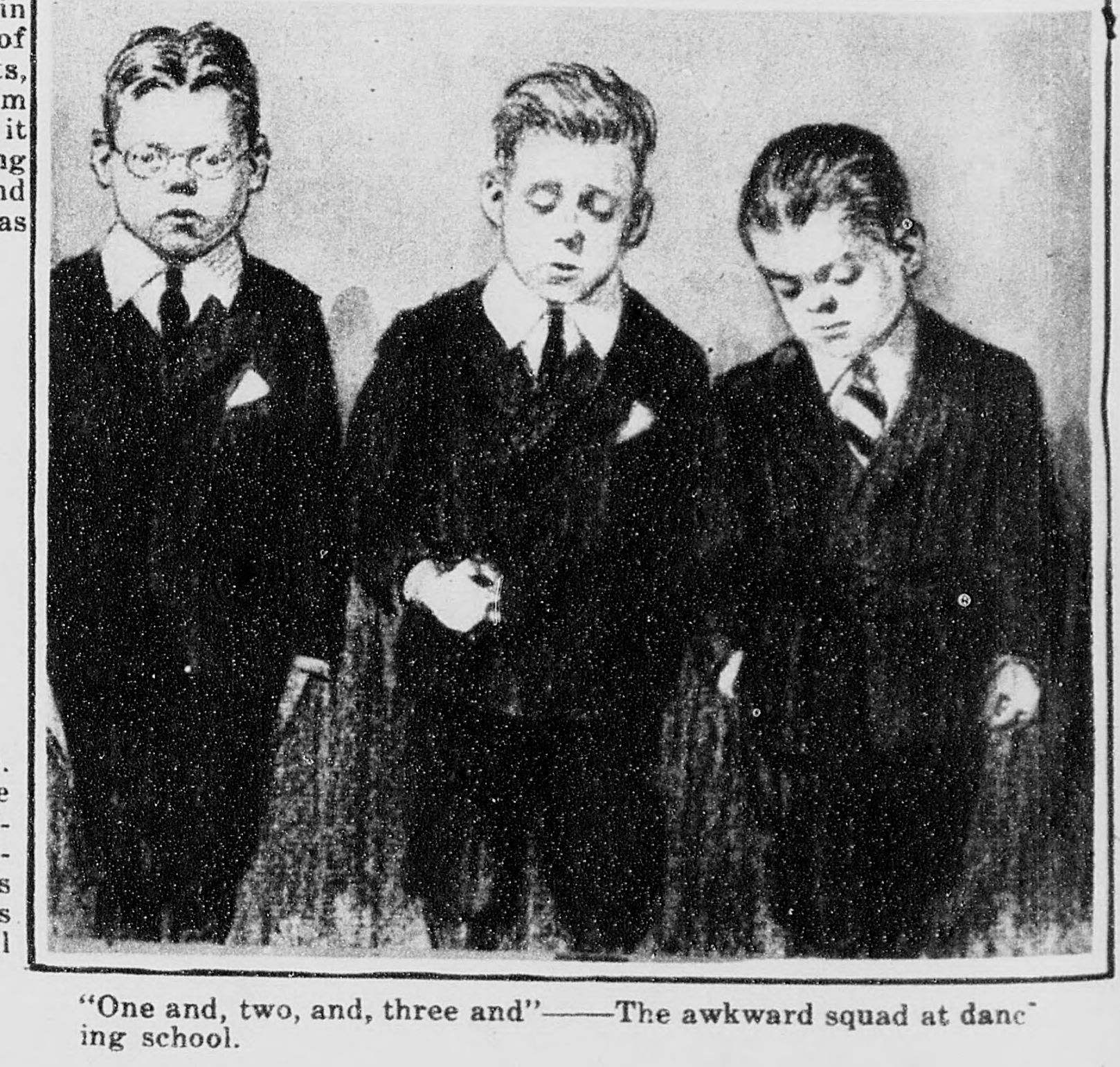
""One and, two and, three and," - the awkward squad at dancing school," The Poetry of Motion, February 20, 1921

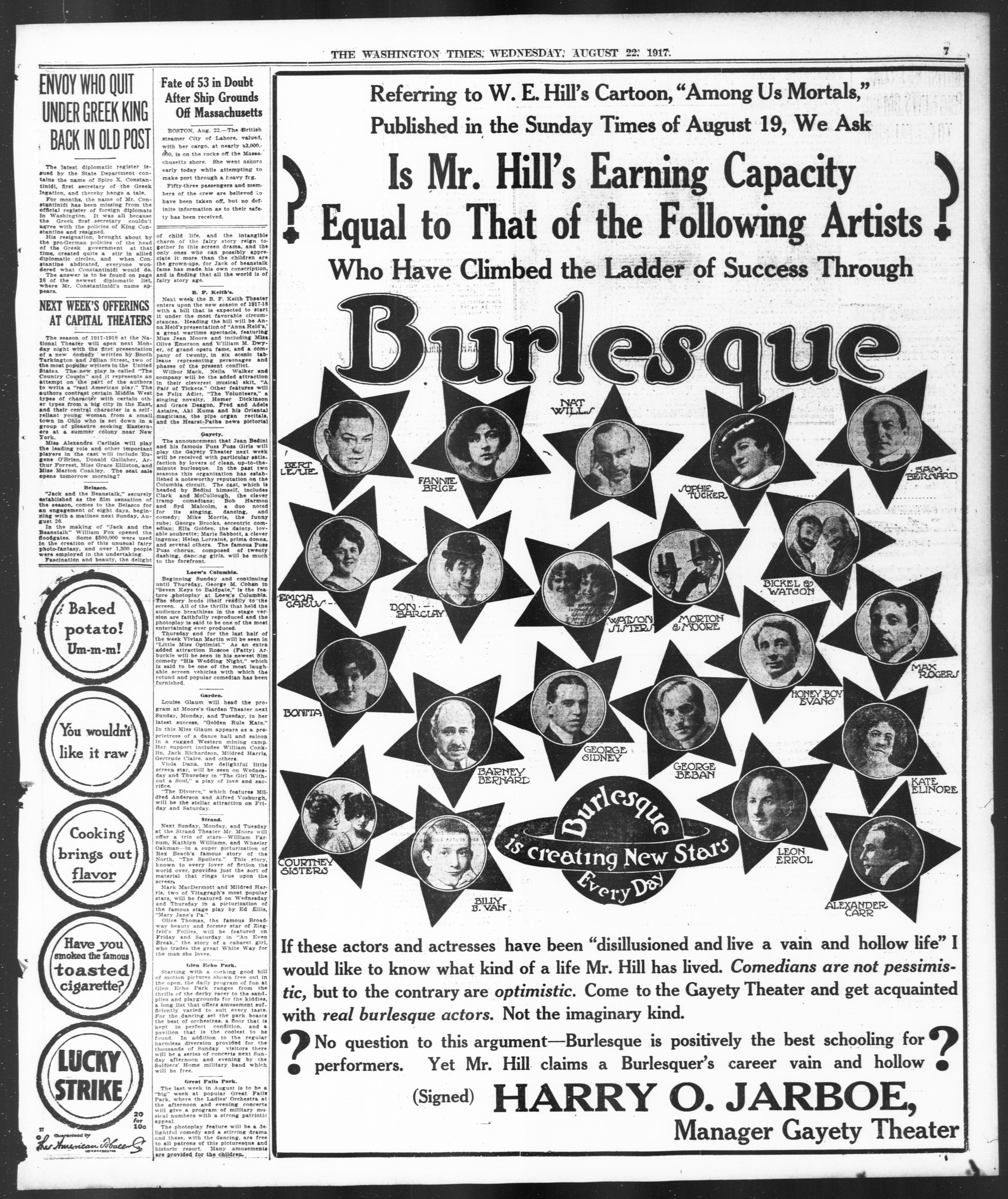
The Washington Times p. 7, August 22, 1917

=== Burlesque Controversy ===
On August 19, 1917, Hill found himself in a bit of a controversy after theming that week's illustrations on a local burlesque show. He was never known for drawing people in a dignified or elegant fashion, so it was perhaps understandable when the performers were offended by his portrayal of them as what they considered to be "disillusioned, vain and hollow." In response, the performers at nearby Gayety Theater took out a full page-ad in The Washington Times to share their thoughts on the publication and to invite Hill to experience real burlesque at one of their shows. The title asked Is Mr. Hill's Earning Capacity Equal to That of The Following Artists Who Have Climbed The Ladder of Success Through Burlesque? and was followed by 21 portraits of successful burlesque performers on star icons. It was signed by the theater's manager, Harry O. Jarboe.

Several interviews with local newspapers followed, where Hill largely laughed off the incident. It is unclear if he ever took the Gayety Theater up on their offer to visit and draw their performers, though he would publish several more burlesque pages once the controversy had settled.

== Collections ==
In addition to private collections, William Ely Hill's work is currently held in the collections of the Delaware Art Museum, the Billy Ireland Cartoon Library & Museum at Ohio State University, the University of Michigan, the University of Utah, and the Library of Congress.
