= Joe Meno =

American writer

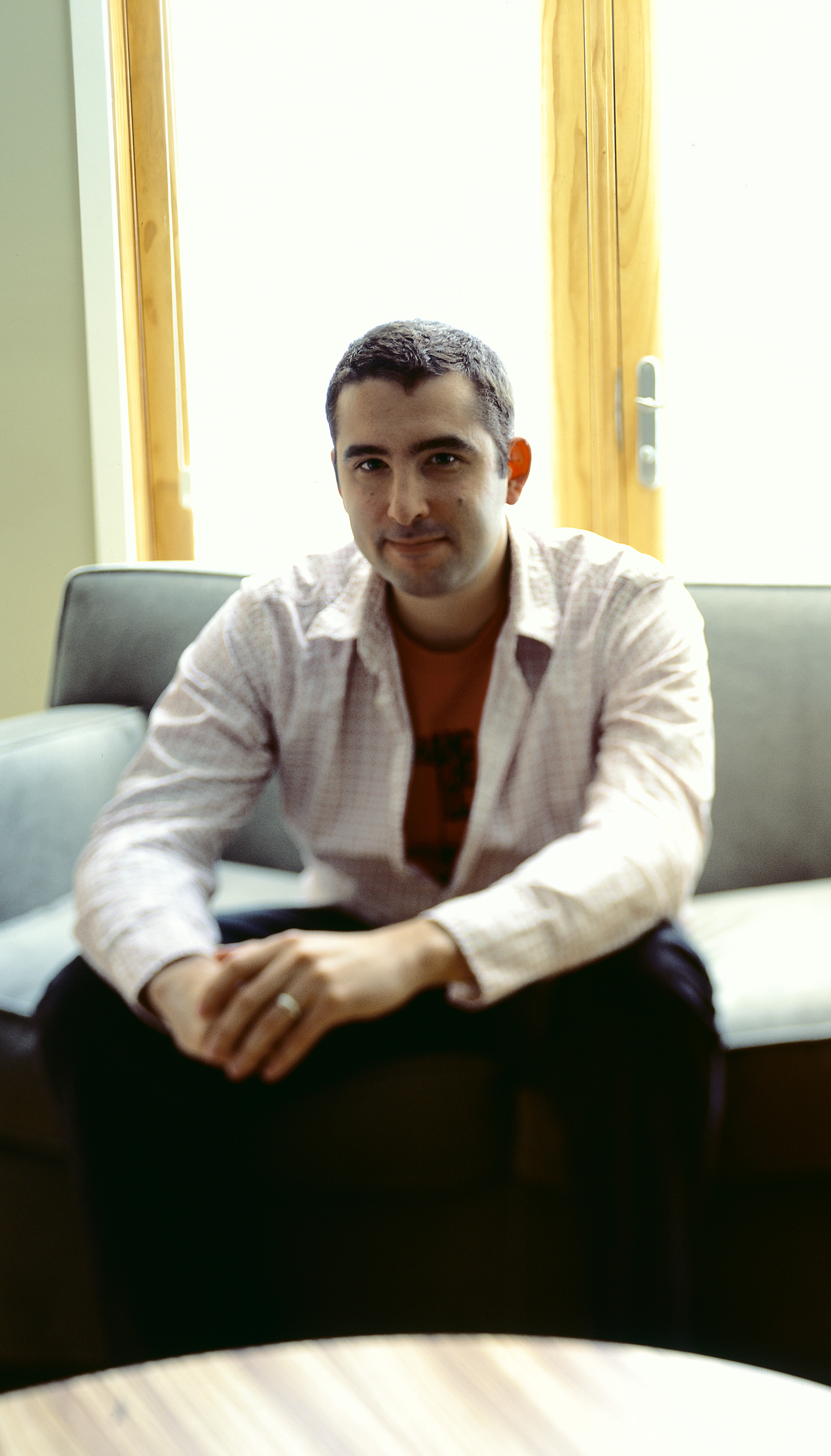
- Education: Columbia College Chicago
- Occupations: Novelist; Playwright; Music journalist
- Website: www.joemeno.com

Joe Meno is an American novelist, writer of short fiction, playwright, and music journalist based in Chicago.

== Career ==
Meno first spent time working as a flower delivery truck driver and art therapy teacher at a juvenile detention center.

His first novel, Tender as Hellfire, was published when he was only 24 and received strong reviews from sources like Library Journal. His short fiction has appeared in literary magazines like TriQuarterly, Ninth Letter, Joyland: A hub for short fiction, and Other Voices.

He has taught fiction writing at Columbia College Chicago. He is a frequent contributor to Punk Planet magazine, where his comic strip Iceberg Town is featured.

== Awards ==
- Nelson Algren Award, 2003, a prize for short fiction given by the Chicago Tribune.
- Hairstyles of the Damned was selected for the Barnes & Noble Discover Great New Writers program for its November 2004 – January 2005 season.
- Bluebirds Used to Croon in the Choir was selected as the winner of the Society of Midland Author's Award for Fiction 2005.
- Demons in the Spring was a finalist for The Story Prize in 2009.
- The Great Perhaps was a winner of the Great Lakes Book Award for Fiction in 2009 and a New York Times Book Review Editor's Choice.

== Selected bibliography ==
- Tender as Hellfire. Akashic Books, 2007/St. Martin's Press, 1999.
- How the Hula Girl Sings. Akashic Books, 2005/ReganBooks, 2001.
- Hairstyles of the Damned. Akashic Books, 2004.
- Bluebirds Used to Croon in the Choir: Stories. Northwestern University Press, 2005.
- The Boy Detective Fails. Akashic Books, 2006.
- Demons in the Spring. Akashic Books, 2008.
- The Great Perhaps. W. W. Norton, 2009.
- Office Girl. Akashic Books, 2012.
- Marvel and a Wonder. Akashic Books, 2015.

== Plays ==
- The Boy Detective Fails.
- Once Upon a Time or the Secret Language of Birds.
- Star Witness.

== Musicals ==
- The Boy Detective Fails.
