= Flaming Youth =

Flaming Youth can refer to:

- Flaming Youth (novel), a 1923 novel by Samuel Hopkins Adams
- Flaming Youth (film), a 1923 film based on the novel starring Colleen Moore and Milton Sills
- Flaming Youth (band), a 1960s British rock group
- "Flaming Youth" (song), a song by the rock group Kiss
