= Nick Carraway =

Fictional character in the novel The Great Gatsby

- The Great Gatsby character
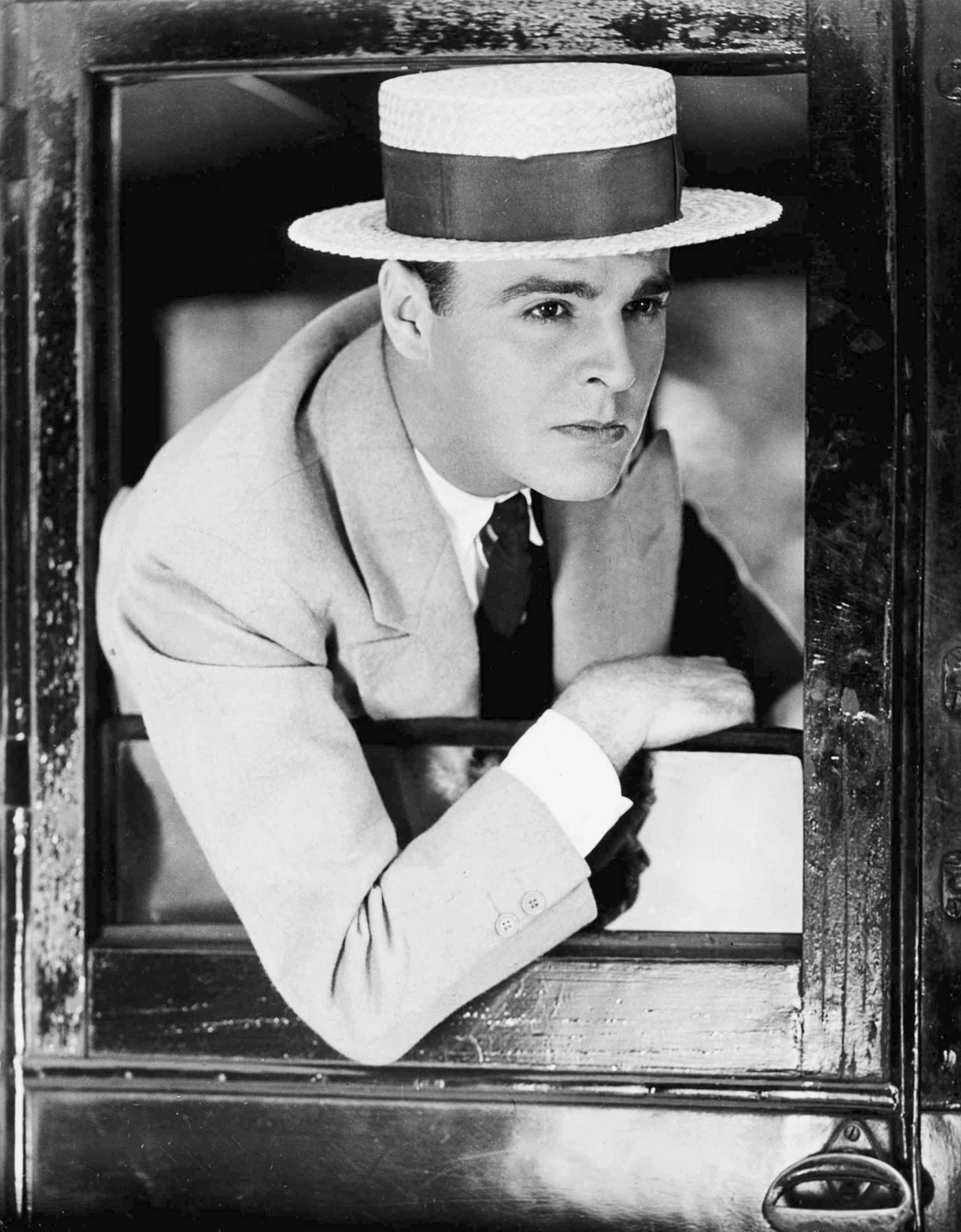
- Nick Carraway as portrayed by actor Neil Hamilton in The Great Gatsby (1926)
- First appearance: The Great Gatsby (1925)
- Created by: F. Scott Fitzgerald
- Portrayed by: See list

In-universe information
- Gender: Male
- Occupation: Bond salesman
- Relatives: Daisy Buchanan (cousin)
- Origin: American Midwest
- Nationality: American

Nick Carraway (/ˈkɛrəweɪ/) is a fictional character and narrator in F. Scott Fitzgerald's 1925 novel The Great Gatsby. The character is a Yale University alumnus from the American Midwest, a World War I veteran, and a newly arrived resident of West Egg on Long Island, near New York City. He is a bond salesman and the neighbor of enigmatic millionaire Jay Gatsby. He facilitates a sexual affair between Gatsby and Nick's second cousin, once removed, Daisy Buchanan, which becomes the novel's central conflict. Carraway is easy-going and optimistic, although his optimism fades as the novel progresses. After witnessing the callous indifference and insouciant hedonism of the idle rich during the riotous Jazz Age, he chooses to leave the eastern United States forever and returns to the Midwest.

The character of Nick Carraway has been analyzed by scholars for nearly a century and has given rise to a number of critical interpretations. According to scholarly consensus, Carraway embodies the pastoral idealism of Fitzgerald. Fitzgerald identifies the Midwest—those "towns beyond the Ohio"—with the perceived virtuousness and rustic simplicity of the American West and as culturally distinct from the decadent values of the eastern United States. Carraway's decision to leave the East evinces a tension between a complex pastoral ideal of a bygone America and the societal transformations caused by industrialization. In this context, Nick's repudiation of the East represents a futile attempt to withdraw into nature. Yet, as Fitzgerald's work shows, any technological demarcation between the eastern and western United States has vanished, and one cannot escape into a pastoral past.

Since the 1970s, scholarship has often focused on Carraway's sexuality. In one instance in the novel, Carraway departs a party with a man described as feminine, and—following suggestive ellipses—next finds himself standing beside a bed while the man sits between the sheets clad only in his underwear. Such passages have led scholars to describe Nick as possessing a queerness and prompted analyses about his attachment to Gatsby. For these reasons, the novel has been described as an exploration of sexual identity during a historical era typified by the societal transition towards modernity.

The character has appeared in various media related to the novel, including stage plays, radio shows, television episodes, and feature films. Actor Ned Wever originated the role of Nick on the stage when he starred in the 1926 Broadway adaptation of Fitzgerald's novel at the Ambassador Theatre in New York City. That same year, actor Neil Hamilton played the role in the now lost 1926 silent film adaptation. In subsequent decades, the role has been played by many actors including Macdonald Carey, Lee Bowman, Rod Taylor, Sam Waterston, Paul Rudd, Bryan Dick, Tobey Maguire, Corbin Bleu, and others.

== Inspiration for the character ==
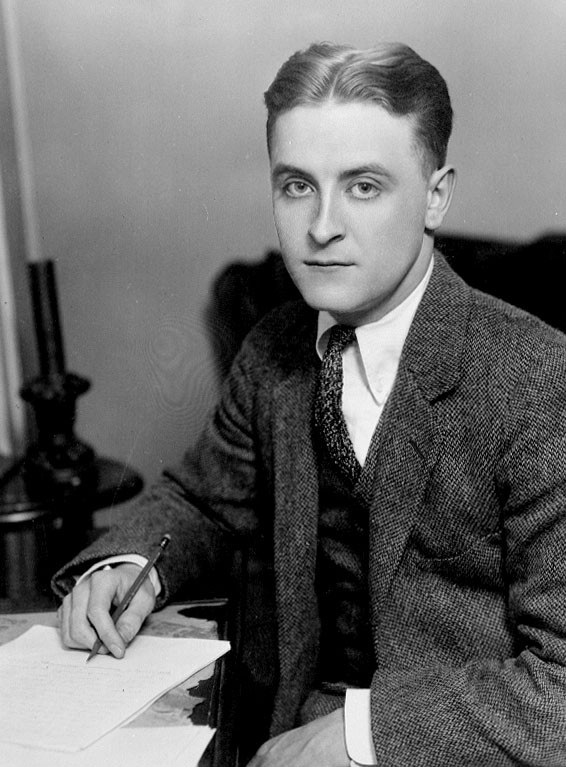
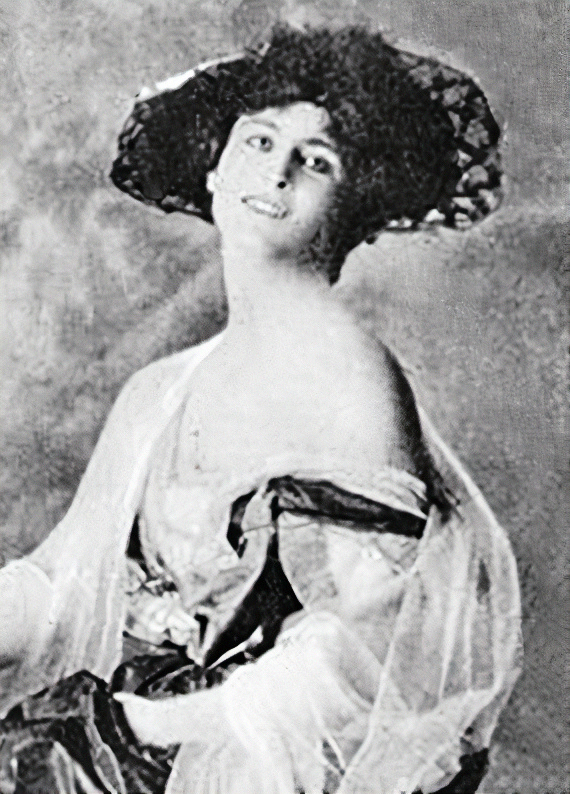
Photographic portrait of F. Scott Fitzgerald circa 1921, and a photograph of Fitzgerald circa 1917 dressed as a woman. After college, Fitzgerald cross-dressed during outings in Minnesota and flirted with men at social events.

Fitzgerald modeled the character of Nick Carraway largely on himself. As a young Midwesterner from Minnesota, Fitzgerald attended Princeton, an Ivy League school, whereas Carraway attends Yale. Much like how Nick's father owns a hardware store, Fitzgerald's father owned a furniture store in Minnesota until 1898. Many scholars, including Fitzgerald's close friend and critic Edmund Wilson, posit that Fitzgerald created the character of Nick as an ideal version of himself. His "characters—and himself—are actors in an elfin harlequinade," Wilson stated.

Nick's Midwestern viewpoint reflects Fitzgerald's own experience. Edmund Wilson observed that Fitzgerald's views reflected "the Middle West of large cities and country clubs", much as writer Sinclair Lewis represented "the Middle West of the prairies and little towns". Wilson ascribed to Fitzgerald the strengths and weaknesses he saw in 1920s Midwesterners including a "sensitivity and eagerness for life without a sound base of culture and taste". He posited that, when Fitzgerald "approaches the East, he brings to it the standards of the wealthy West—the preoccupation with display, the love of magnificence and jazz, the vigorous social atmosphere of amiable flappers and youths comparatively unpoisoned as yet by the snobbery of the East".

When creating the character of Carraway, Fitzgerald originally named the character Dud. In earlier drafts of the novel, (Note: Only two pages of the first draft of The Great Gatsby survive. Fitzgerald enclosed them with a letter to Willa Cather in 1925. They are now in the Fitzgerald Papers collection at Princeton University.) the character shared a romance with Daisy Buchanan prior to their reunion on Long Island. Fitzgerald's rewrites excised any romantic past between Nick and Daisy, as well as added and then deleted a passage implying that Nick departed a job after a male acquaintance amorously pursued him. He also changed the viewpoint of an omniscient narrator to Nick's subjective perspective. These alterations introduced considerable ambiguity regarding both Nick's reliability as a narrator and his sexuality which became the focus of scholarship.

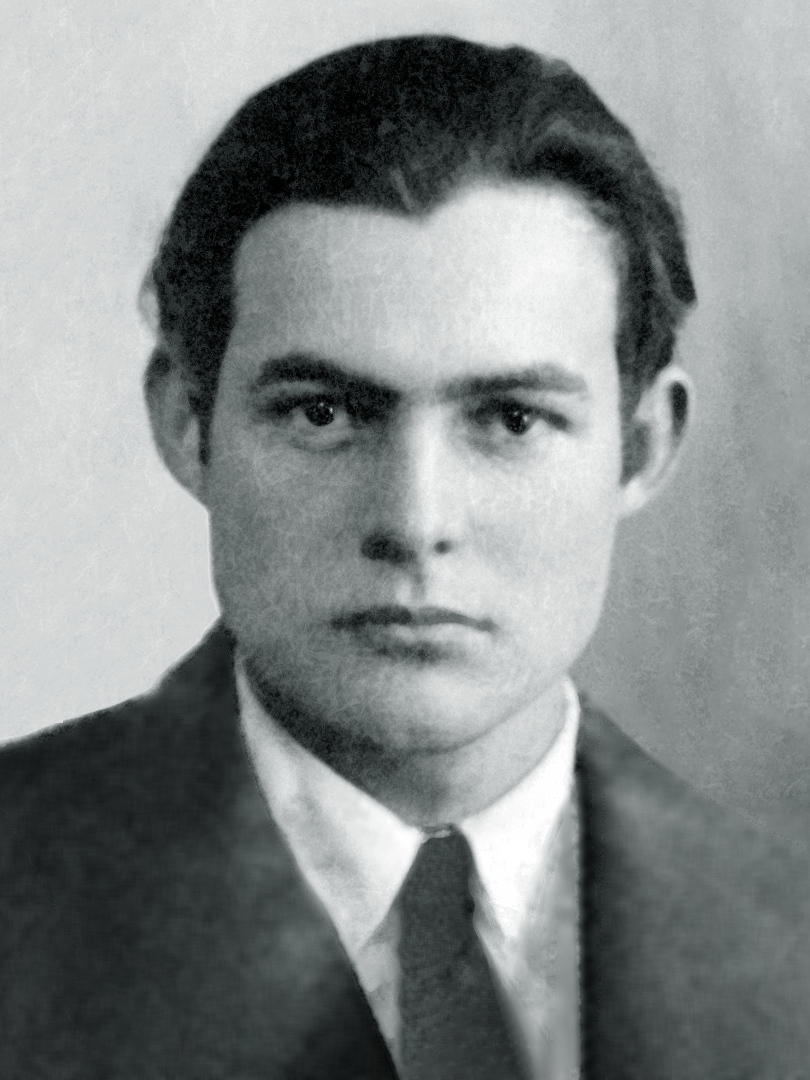
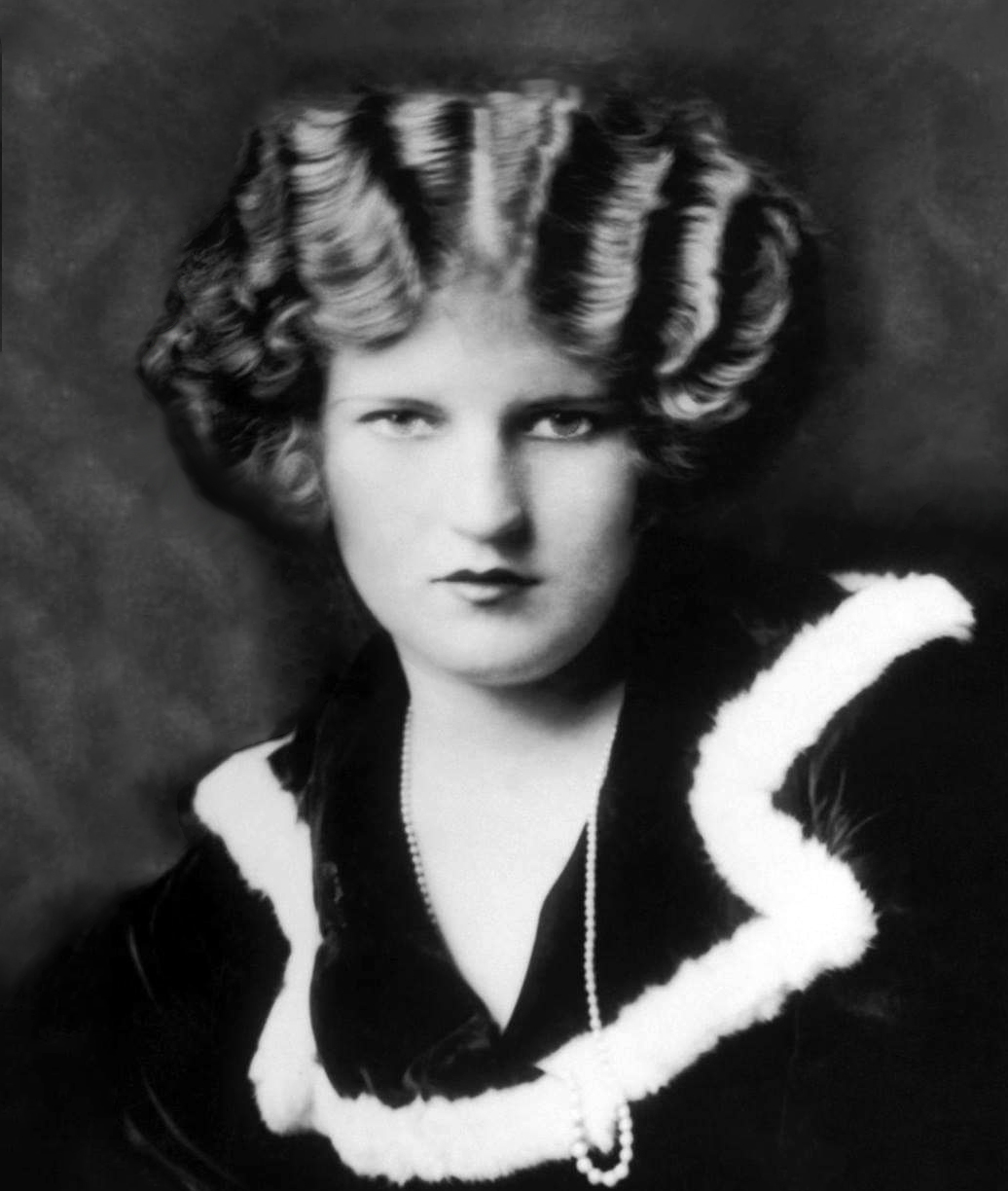
Both Ernest Hemingway and Fitzgerald's wife Zelda Sayre questioned the author's sexuality.

The ambiguity of Nick's sexuality reflects a similar ambiguity regarding Fitzgerald's own sexuality. During his lifetime, Fitzgerald's sexuality became a subject of debate among his friends and acquaintances. As a youth, Fitzgerald had a close relationship with Father Sigourney Fay, a possibly gay Catholic priest, and Fitzgerald used his last name for the idealized romantic character of Daisy Fay. After college, Fitzgerald cross-dressed during outings in Minnesota, and he flirted with other men at social events.

While drafting The Great Gatsby, rumors about Fitzgerald's alleged homosexuality dogged him among the American expat community in Paris, and Ernest Hemingway avoided him due to these rumors. In his memoir A Moveable Feast, Hemingway wrote that Scott "looked like a boy with a face between handsome and pretty. He had... a delicate longlipped Irish mouth that, on a girl, would have been the mouth of a beauty... The mouth worried you until you knew him and then it worried you more." After Hemingway broke off relations, Fitzgerald wrote in his notebook: "I really loved him, but of course it wore out like a love affair."

Fitzgerald's wife Zelda Sayre doubted his heterosexuality and called him a closeted homosexual. Zelda belittled him with homophobic slurs and alleged that Fitzgerald and Ernest Hemingway engaged in sexual relations. This accusation possibly stemmed from Hemingway examining Fitzgerald's genitalia in a Paris restroom after Zelda taunted him over his penis size. In his 1964 memoir A Moveable Feast, Hemingway described Fitzgerald's genitalia as normal. Both Fitzgerald's mistress Sheilah Graham and acquaintance Arnold Gingrich, who had once seen him in an open bathrobe, confirmed its average size, lending credence to Hemingway's claim that Zelda sought to destroy her husband with unfounded attacks. Such incidents strained the Fitzgeralds' marriage at the time of the novel's publication.

I don't know what it is in me or that comes to me when I start to write. I am half feminine—at least my mind is...

— F. Scott Fitzgerald, Letter to Laura Guthrie, 1935

Although Fitzgerald's sexuality remains a subject of scholarly debate, (Note: Fessenden (2005) argues that Fitzgerald struggled with his sexual orientation. In contrast, Bruccoli (2002) insists that "anyone can be called a latent homosexual, but there is no evidence that Fitzgerald was ever involved in a homosexual attachment".) such biographical details lent credence to scholarly interpretations that his fictional characters such as Nick Carraway, Jordan Baker, and others are gay or bisexual surrogates. Scholars particularly focus on Fitzgerald's description of his mind in a 1935 letter as "half feminine". Although "born masculine," Fitzgerald described himself as "half feminine—at least my mind is... Even my feminine characters are feminine Scott Fitzgeralds."

== Fictional character biography ==
In my younger and more vulnerable years my father gave me some advice that I've been turning over in my mind ever since. "Whenever you feel like criticising any one," he told me, "just remember that all the people in this world haven't had the advantages that you've had."

— F. Scott Fitzgerald, Chapter I, The Great Gatsby

Nick Carraway grew up in the Midwestern United States, a region he describes as "the ragged edge of the universe." His family claimed descent from the Dukes of Buccleuch and owned a hardware business since 1851, maintaining prominence and wealth for generations. Due to his privileged upbringing, Carraway's father cautioned him against passing judgment on individuals who did not enjoy the same advantages. After his graduation from Yale University in 1915 and the United States' entry into World War I in 1917, Nick served in the Ninth Machine-Gun Battalion of the 3rd Division. (Note: In the original 1925 text, Fitzgerald specified the "Twenty-eighth Infantry" of the "First Division". Fitzgerald corrected the text in subsequent editions to be the "Ninth Machine-Gun Battalion" of the "Third Division".)

After the Allied Powers signed an armistice with Imperial Germany in 1918, a restless Nick moved from the Midwest to West Egg, a wealthy enclave on Long Island, to learn about the bond business. (Note: West Egg is based on Great Neck, New York. From 1922 to 1924, Fitzgerald resided at 6 Gateway Drive in Great Neck, New York. His neighbors included such newly wealthy personages as writer Ring Lardner, actor Lew Fields and comedian Ed Wynn. These figures were regarded as nouveau riche (new rich), unlike those who came from Manhasset Neck, which sat across the bay from Great Neck—places that were home to many of New York's wealthiest established families. This juxtaposition gave Fitzgerald his idea for "West Egg" and "East Egg".) He lives across the bay from his affluent second cousin, once removed, Daisy Buchanan and her husband Tom Buchanan, formerly Nick's classmate at Yale. They introduce him to their cynical friend Jordan Baker, a masculine golf champion and heiress. Jordan and Nick embark upon an exploratory romance, although Carraway describes his interest in Jordan Baker as not love but "a sort of tender curiosity".

Soon after, Nick's wealthy neighbor Jay Gatsby invites him to one of his lavish soirées, replete with famous guests and hot jazz music. Nick is intrigued by the enigmatic millionaire, especially when Gatsby introduces him to Meyer Wolfsheim, a Jewish gangster who is rumored to have been behind the Black Sox Scandal, the fixing the World Series in 1919 and helped Gatsby make his fortune in the bootlegging business. Gatsby confesses to Nick that he has been in love with Daisy since the war and that his extravagant lifestyle is an attempt to win her affections. He asks Nick for his help in seducing her and Nick invites Daisy over to his house without telling her that Gatsby will be there. When Gatsby and Daisy resume their love affair, Nick serves as their confidant.

When I came back from the East last autumn I felt that I wanted the world to be in uniform and at a sort of moral attention forever; I wanted no more riotous excursions with privileged glimpses into the human heart.

— F. Scott Fitzgerald, Chapter I, The Great Gatsby

Several months later, Tom discovers the affair when Daisy addresses Gatsby with unabashed intimacy in front of him. After a confrontation at the Plaza Hotel in New York City, Gatsby and Daisy leave together in his car. Nick learns that Daisy struck and killed George's wife and Tom's lover, Myrtle Wilson, in Gatsby's car. Tom informs George that Gatsby had been driving the car. George kills Gatsby and then himself. Nick holds a funeral for Gatsby and breaks up with Jordan.

Nick now loathes New York City and decides that Gatsby, Daisy, Tom and he were all Midwesterners unsuited to Eastern life. Nick encounters Tom and initially refuses to shake his hand. Tom admits he told George that Gatsby owned the vehicle that killed Myrtle. Before returning to the Midwest, Nick returns to Gatsby's mansion and stares across the bay at the green light emanating from the end of Daisy's dock.

== Critical analysis ==
=== Unreliable narrator ===
Every one suspects himself of at least one of the cardinal virtues, and this is mine: I am one of the few honest people that I have ever known.

— F. Scott Fitzgerald, Chapter III, The Great Gatsby

Since the 1960s, critics have drawn attention to Nick Carraway's status as first an observer and then as a participant, questioning his reliability as narrator. As the narrator of the story, other characters are presented as Carraway perceives them, and he directs the reader's sympathies.

In 1966, critic Gary Scrimgeour argued in Criticism magazine that the narrator's unreliability perhaps indicated Fitzgerald's confusion about the novel's plot, while critic Charles Wild Walcutt posited in the same year that Nick's narrative unreliability is intentional, and critic Thomas Boyle argued in 1969 that Nick's unreliability is an integral part of the novel.

Although Carraway proclaims himself to be "one of the few honest people that I have ever known," critics observe that he is shallow, confused, hypocritical, and immoral. He says little about a previous marital engagement and his wartime experience; both of which are first raised by other characters.

=== Lost Generation ===
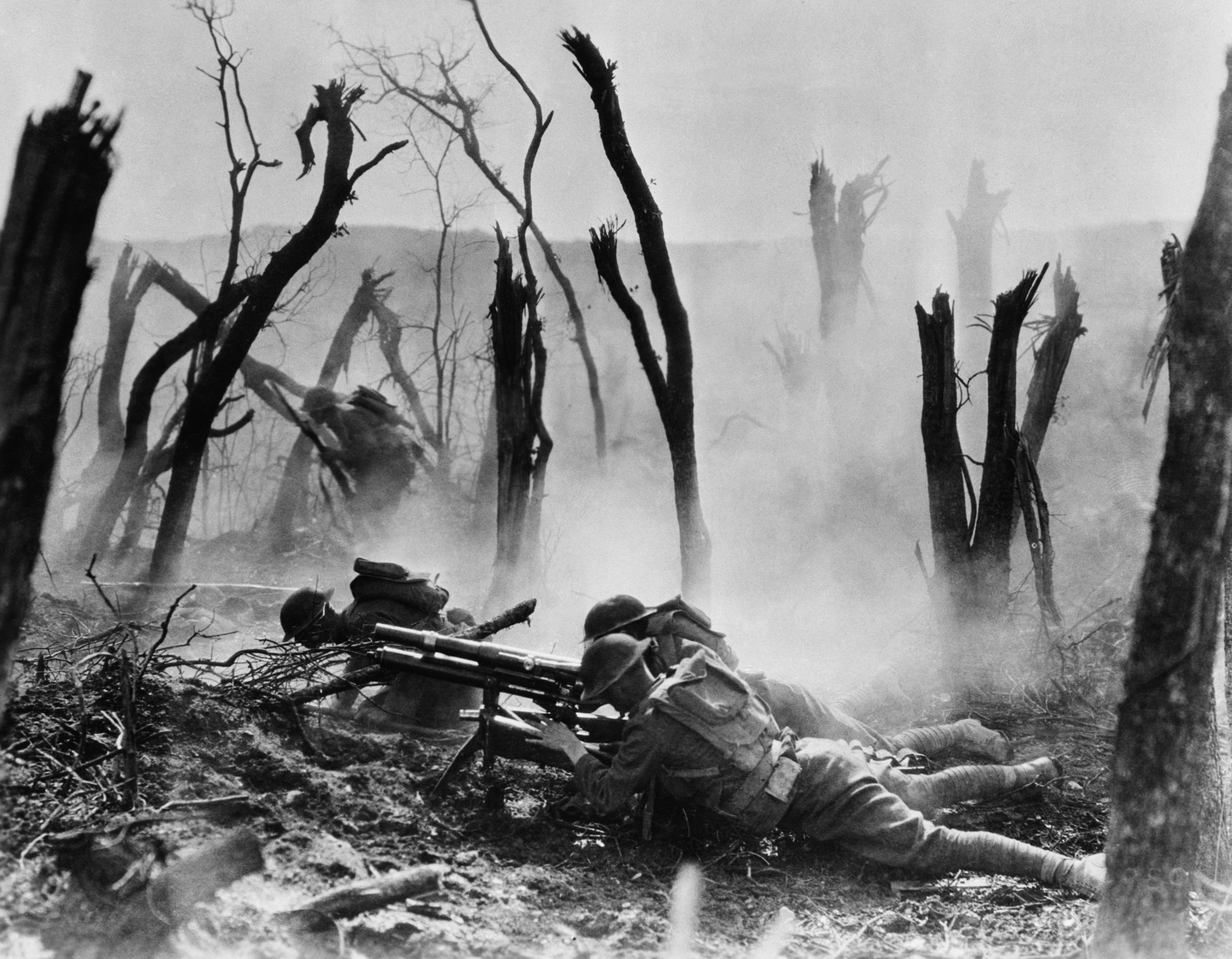
Certain scholars posit Nick Carraway as typifing Gertrude Stein's Lost Generation. Fitzgerald rejected Stein's characterization of war veterans as a "lost generation". Pictured above: American doughboys during the Meuse-Argonne offensive, 1918

Despite the fact that F. Scott Fitzgerald rejected Gertrude Stein's characterization of World War I veterans as a so-called Lost Generation set adrift by the conflict's horrors, a number of scholars nonetheless posited that the character of Nick Carraway typifies this generation. In 1944, nearly twenty years after The Great Gatsby's publication, critic Charles Weir, Jr. counted Fitzgerald—who never fought in the war and denied that "the war left any real lasting effect"—among Stein's war-shattered Lost Generation. Weir argued that the literary themes throughout all of Fitzgerald's works must be understood in the context of the conflict "leaving behind it a generation of sad young men, distrustful of ideas or of ideals, shunning any sort of generalization, 'cynical rather than revolutionary,' 'tired of Great Causes.'"

In 1952, scholar Edwin S. Fussell similarly counted Fitzgerald as a member of the Lost Generation. Fussell argued that Fitzgerald's The Great Gatsby functioned as a critique of that generation. He regarded Fitzgerald's "greatest discovery" to be the realization "that there was nothing new about the Lost Generation except its particular symbols." Fussell contended that the novel criticized the cynical attitude of the Lost Generation and amounted to an ironic rejection of this generation and its beliefs in favor of a "romantic wonder that is extensive enough to comprehend all American experience."

Following Weir and Fussell, scholars such as Jeffrey Steinbrink observed that characters such as Nick Carraway typify the Lost Generation. In particular, Carraway reflects the Lost Generation's view of pre-war America as "not simply remote, but archaic, the repository of an innocence long since dead. Possessed of what seemed an irrelevant past, Americans faced an inaccessible future; for a moment in our history there was only the present." Steinbrink speculated that Carraway's journey eastward is "not simply to learn the bond business, but because his wartime experiences have left him restless in his midwestern hometown and because he wishes to make a clean break" from past traumas.

I am tired, too, of hearing that the world war broke down the moral barriers of the younger generation. Indeed, except for leaving its touch of destruction here and there, I do not think the war left any real lasting effect. Why, it is almost forgotten right now. The younger generation has been changing all through the last twenty years. The war had little or nothing to do with it.... Young people, here and in England, have made radical departures from the Victorian era.

— F. Scott Fitzgerald, Shadowland interview, 1921

Although scholars such as Weir, Fussell, Steinbrink, and others attributed the disillusionment of young Americans and the advent of the Jazz Age to the carnage of World War I, Fitzgerald adamantly rejected such theories during his lifetime. Fitzgerald publicly dismissed Gertrude Stein's view of veterans as a "lost generation" and expressed confidence in their resilience and fortitude. Fitzgerald instead identified the veterans' younger peers, who had been adolescents during the war, as the specific generation that embodied the Jazz Age's excessive hedonism.

Fitzgerald described these younger persons as the true "lost" generation who became the era's hedonistic luminaries, and older generations imitated their wild behavior. "The generation which had been adolescent during the confusion of the War, brusquely shouldered my contemporaries out of the way," Fitzgerald explained. "This was the generation whose girls dramatized themselves as flappers". (Note: Flappers were young, modern women who bobbed their hair and wore short skirts. They also drank alcohol and had premarital sex.) Fitzgerald viewed this post-war generation as weak-willed, lacking vitality, and devoid of moral standards. He believed novels such as The Plastic Age and Flaming Youth best captured this younger generation in fiction.

Scarcely had the staider citizens of the republic caught their breaths when the wildest of all generations, the generation which had been adolescent during the confusion of the War, brusquely shouldered my contemporaries out of the way and danced into the limelight. This was the generation whose girls dramatized themselves as flappers, the generation that corrupted its elders and eventually overreached itself less through lack of morals than through lack of taste.

— F. Scott Fitzgerald, "Echoes of the Jazz Age", 1931

Declaring that "the war had little or nothing to do" with the change in morals among young Americans or the emergence of the Jazz Age, Fitzgerald attributed the sexual revolution among young Americans to a combination of popular literary works by H. G. Wells and other intellectuals criticizing repressive social norms, Sigmund Freud's sexual theories gaining salience among young women, and the invention of the automobile enabling youths to escape parental surveillance in order to engage in premarital sex.

Fitzgerald further argued that young Americans became disillusioned after witnessing how police treated peaceful veterans returning from World War I. He claimed that the excessive use of force by police officers against protesting war veterans during the 1919 May Day Riots triggered a wave of cynicism among young Americans, leading them to question whether the United States differed from despotic regimes in Europe.

Because of this growing cynicism among American youth, Fitzgerald identified political apathy as the defining characteristic of young Americans during the Jazz Age. Critic Edmund Wilson opined that these young Americans regarded civilization as "a contemptible farce of the futile and the absurd; the world of finance, the army, and finally, the world of business are successively and casually exposed as completely without dignity or point. The inference is that, in such a civilization, the sanest and most creditable thing is to forget organized society and live for the jazz of the moment."

=== Pastoral idealism ===
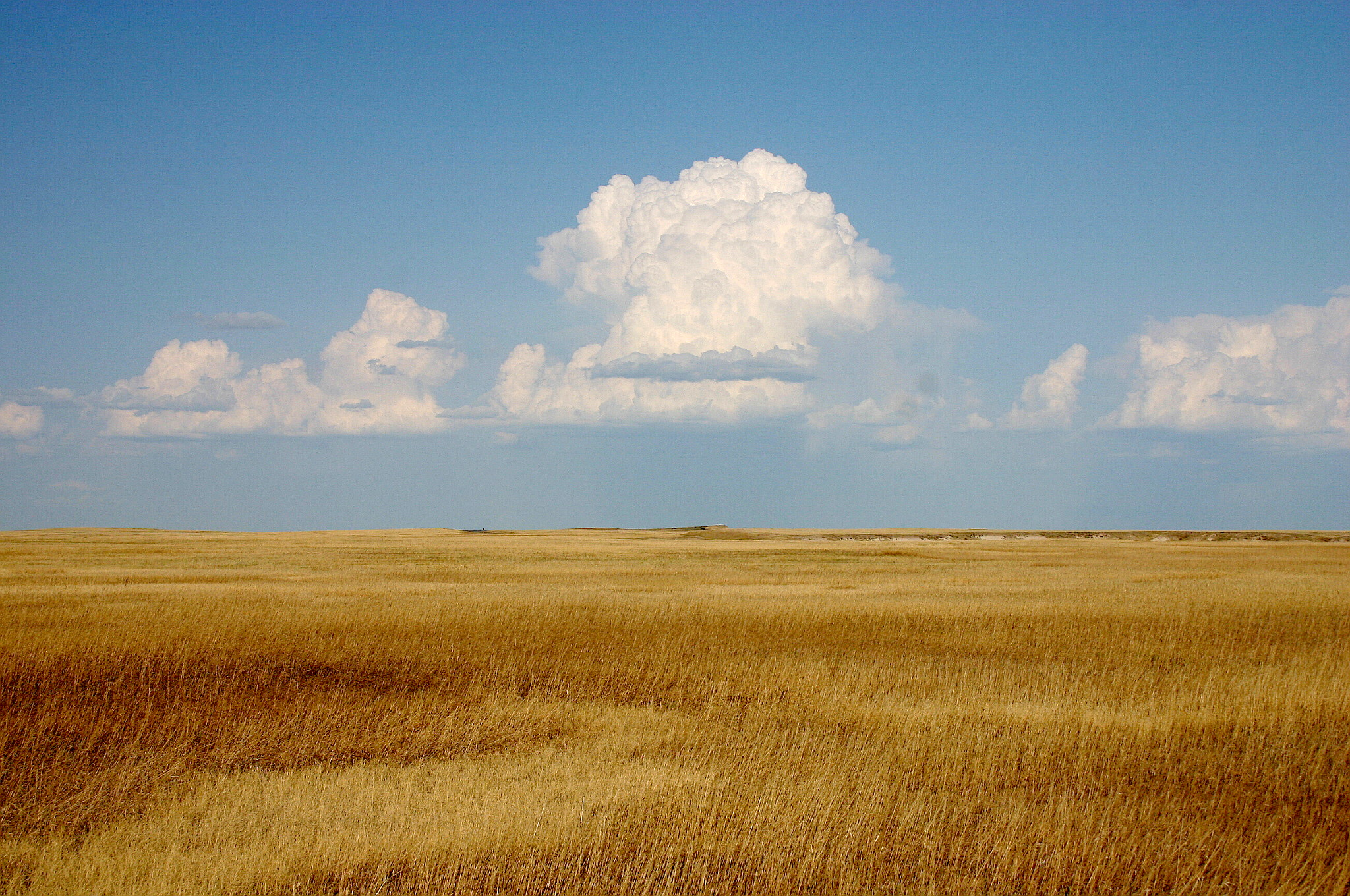
Scholars posit that Nick Carraway embodies the pastoral idealism of Fitzgerald who cherished the rustic simplicity of the American Midwest.

Throughout the novel, Carraway identifies the Midwest—those "towns beyond the Ohio"—with the perceived virtuousness and rustic simplicity of the American West and as culturally distinct from the decadence of the eastern United States. Fitzgerald biographer Andrew Turnbull notes that "in those days the contrasts between East and West, between city and country, between prep school and high school were more marked than they are now, and correspondingly the nuances of dress and manners were more noticeable".

At the end of the novel, Nick ultimately returns to the Midwest after despairing of the decadence and indifference of the East. Scholar Thomas Hanzo posits that Carraway must return "to the comparatively rigid morality of his ancestral West and to its embodiment in the manners of Western society. He alone of all the Westerners can return, since the others have suffered, apparently beyond any conceivable redemption, a moral degeneration brought on by their meeting with that form of Eastern society which developed during the Twenties."

Similarly, scholar Jeffrey Steinbrink argues that "the Twenties was both a birth-cry and a death-rattle for, if it announced the arrival of the first generation of modern Americans, it also declared an end to the Jeffersonian dream of simple agrarian virtue as the standard of national conduct and the epitome of national aspiration. The new generation forfeited its claim to the melioristic certainties of an earlier time as the price of its full participation in the twentieth century".

I see now that this has been a story of the West, after all — Tom and Gatsby, Daisy and Jordan and I, we're all Westerners, and perhaps we possessed some deficiency in common which made us subtly unadaptable to Eastern life.

— F. Scott Fitzgerald, Chapter IX, The Great Gatsby

In 1964, historian and literary critic Leo Marx argued in The Machine in the Garden that Nick Carraway's decision to return to the Midwest in the novel evinces a tension between a complex pastoral ideal of a bygone America and the societal transformations caused by industrialization and machine technology.

Marx argues that Fitzgerald, via Nick Carraway, expresses a pastoral longing typical of other 1920s American writers like William Faulkner and Ernest Hemingway. Although such writers cherish the pastoral ideal, they accept that technological progress has deprived this ideal of nearly all meaning. In this context, Nick's repudiation of the eastern United States represents a futile attempt to withdraw into nature. Yet, as Fitzgerald's work shows, any technological demarcation between the eastern and western United States has long since vanished, and one cannot escape into a pastoral past.

=== Queer reading ===
"Keep your hands off the lever," snapped the elevator boy.
"I beg your pardon," said Mr. McKee with dignity, "I didn't know I was touching it."
"All right," I agreed, "I'll be glad to."
. . . I was standing beside his bed and he was sitting up between the sheets, clad in his underwear, with a great portfolio in his hands.

— F. Scott Fitzgerald, Chapter II, The Great Gatsby

As early as 1945, literary critics such as Lionel Trilling noted that various characters in The Great Gatsby were intended by Fitzgerald to be "vaguely homosexual" and in 1960, writer Otto Friedrich commented upon the ease of examining Nick Carraway's thwarted relations through a queer lens.

By the 1970s, scholarship increasingly focused on Carraway's sexuality. These analyses often focus on a passage where Carraway departs an orgy with a feminine man and—following discussion about an elevator lever and suggestive ellipses—next finds himself standing beside a bed while the man sits between the sheets clad only in his underwear. Such passages have led scholars to describe Nick as possessing a queerness and prompted analyses about his attachment to Gatsby. For these reasons, scholars describe the novel as an exploration of sexual identity during a historical period marked by society's transition to modernity.

Other indications of Carraway's possible homosexuality stem from a comparison of his descriptions of men and women. For example, the greatest compliment that Nick gives Daisy is that she has a "low, thrilling voice", and his description of Jordan emphasizes her masculine qualities. Conversely, Nick's description of Tom focuses on his muscles and the "enormous power" of his body, and in the passage where Nick first encounters Gatsby, writer Greg Olear argues that "if you came across that passage out of context, you would probably conclude it was from a romance novel. If that scene were a cartoon, Cupid would shoot an arrow, music would swell, and Nick's eyes would turn into giant hearts."

Different scholars draw disparate conclusions regarding the importance of Nick's sexuality to the novel. Greg Olear argues that Nick idealizes Gatsby in a similar way to how Gatsby idealizes Daisy, whereas Fitzgerald scholar Tracy Fessenden posits that Nick's attraction to Gatsby serves to contrast the love story between Gatsby and Daisy. In the eyes of the scholar Joseph Vogel, "a strong case can be made that the most compelling story of unrequited love—in both the novel and the film—is not between Jay Gatsby and Daisy, but between Nick and Jay Gatsby."

Other scholars and writers disagree with such interpretations. Matthew J. Bolton dismisses interpretations of Nick's homosexuality as a case of what narratologists call "overreading." Writer Michael Bourne believes whether or not Carraway is gay "can't be proven one way or the other—but I suspect the queer readings of Carraway say more about the way we read now than they do about Nick or The Great Gatsby." American novelist Steve Erickson, writing in Los Angeles magazine, states that Carraway's fascination with Gatsby is less of his being in love with Gatsby than "Carraway, back from the war and back from the Midwest and wanting nothing more than to be Gatsby himself".

== Portrayals ==
=== Stage ===
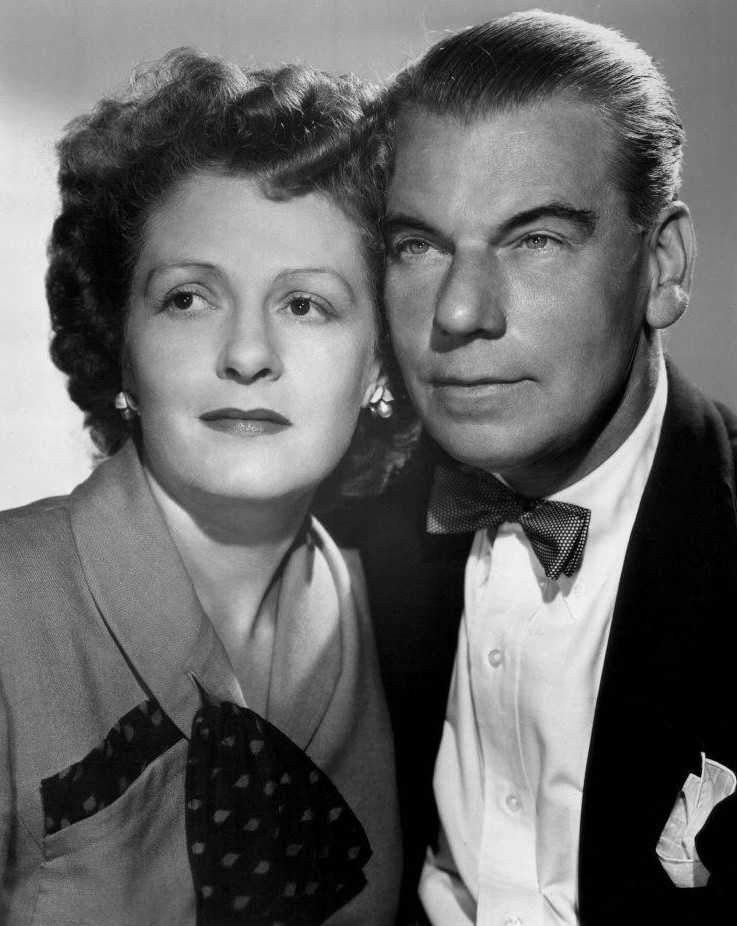
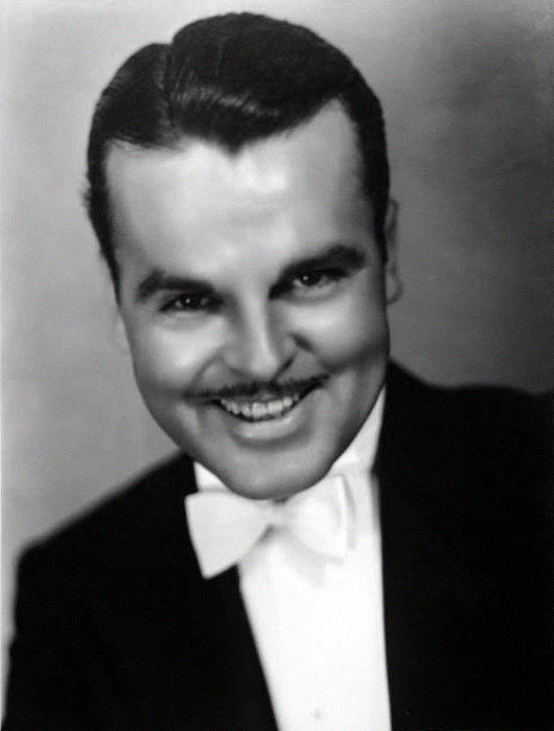
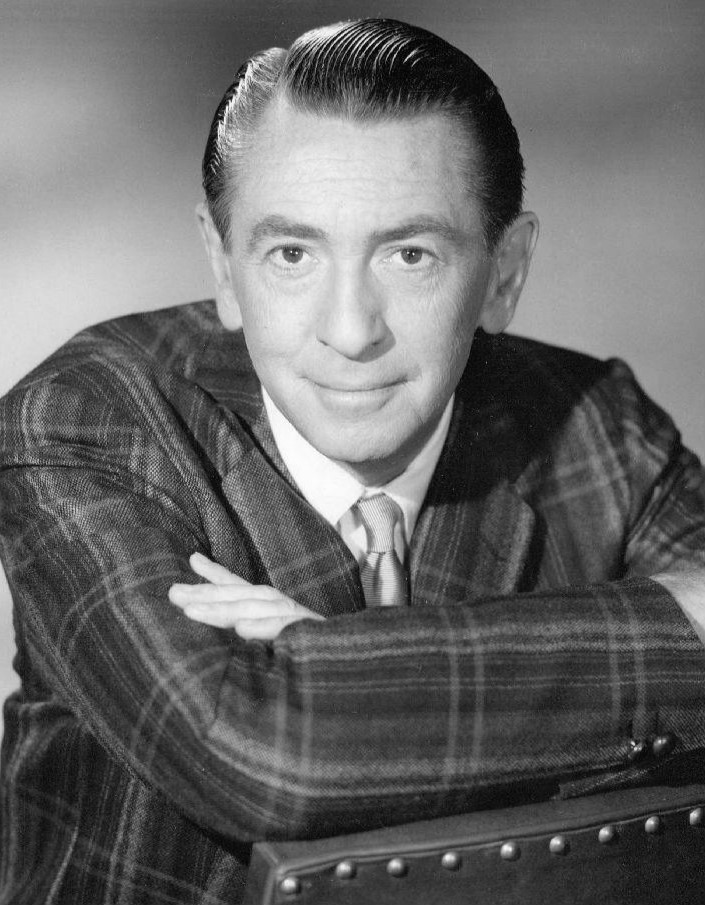
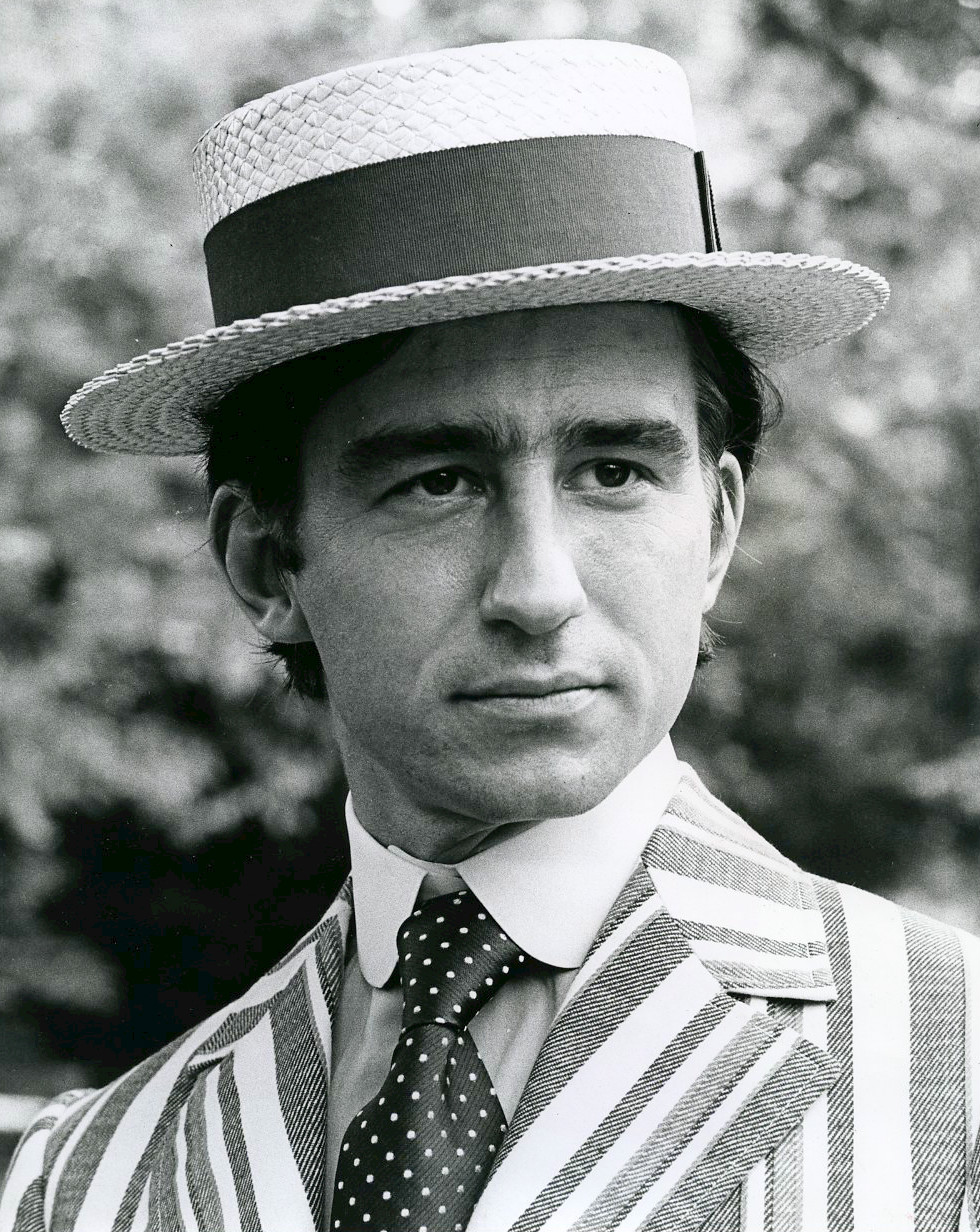
Ned Wever (top left) originated the role of Nick Carraway on the Broadway stage in 1926. Neil Hamilton (top right), Macdonald Carey (bottom left), and Sam Waterston (bottom right) portrayed Nick in other film adaptations.

The first actor to portray Nick Carraway in any medium was 24-year-old Ned Wever who starred in the 1926 Broadway adaptation of Fitzgerald's novel at the Ambassador Theatre in New York City. The play was directed by future motion picture auteur George Cukor. The production delighted audiences and garnered rave reviews from theater critics.

The play ran for 112 performances and paused when its lead actor James Rennie, who portrayed Jay Gatsby, traveled to the United Kingdom to visit an ailing family member. As F. Scott Fitzgerald was vacationing in Europe at the time, he never saw the 1926 Broadway play, but his agent Harold Ober sent him telegrams quoting the glowing reviews of the production. The success of the 1926 Broadway play led to the 1926 film adaptation by director Herbert Brenon.

Many actors have played Nick Carraway in later stage productions. In 1999, Dwayne Croft portrayed the character in John Harbison's operatic adaptation of the work performed at the New York Metropolitan Opera, and Matthew Amendt portrayed Carraway in Simon Levy's 2006 stage adaptation of Fitzgerald's novel. In the fall of 2023, Noah J. Ricketts played Carraway in The Great Gatsby: A New Musical which later transferred to Broadway in March 2024. Corbin Bleu played Carraway in the West End production of the musical which opened in April 2025. In the summer of 2024, Ben Levi Ross played Nick in Florence Welch's musical Gatsby: An American Myth at the American Repertory Theatre.

=== Film ===
Many actors have portrayed Nick Carraway in cinematic adaptations of Fitzgerald's novel. The first cinematic adaptation of The Great Gatsby was a silent film produced in 1926 and featured Neil Hamilton as Nick. Reviewers praised Neil Hamilton's portrayal of Carraway, but F. Scott Fitzgerald and his wife Zelda Sayre Fitzgerald purportedly loathed the 1926 film adaptation and walked out midway through a viewing of the film at a theater. "We saw The Great Gatsby at the movies," Zelda wrote to an acquaintance, "It's ROTTEN and awful and terrible and we left." The film is now considered lost.

In 1949, a second cinematic adaptation was undertaken starring Macdonald Carey as Nick. In contrast to the 1926 adaptation, the 1949 adaptation was filmed under the strictures of the Hollywood Production Code, and the novel's plot was altered to appease Production Code Administration censors. Critic Lew Sheaffer wrote in The Brooklyn Daily Eagle that Carey acquitted himself well as Gatsby's only friend. Boyd Martin of The Courier-Journal opined that Carey gave a quiet and reserved performance.

In 1974, Sam Waterston portrayed Nick in the third cinematic adaptation. The film received poor critical reviews, but Waterson's performance garnered positive reviews. Vincent Canby of The New York Times wrote that "Waterston is splendid as Nick, the narrator, a role that might have looked like a tour guide's except for the fact that Waterston has the presence and weight as an actor to give it a kind of moral heft." Similarly, Gene Siskel noted "Waterston brings the proper mixture of halting action and determined thinking to his portrayal of Nick. He alone distinguishes The Great Gatsby from so many elephantine Hollywood productions."

In 2013, Tobey Maguire portrayed Nick in the fourth cinematic adaptation. In director Baz Luhrmann's 2013 adaptation, Carraway is depicted as a mental patient inside a sanitarium where he has taken to writing as a form of psychiatric therapy. According to Maguire, the decision to confine Nick in a sanitarium occurred during pre-production as a collaborative idea between himself, director Baz Luhrmann, and co-screenwriter Craig Pearce. Critic Jonathan Romney of The Independent opined that Tobey Maguire as Carraway was the least impressive of the cast, and he lamented that Luhrmann's adaptation disappointingly painted the character as "a straw-hatted goof."

=== Television ===
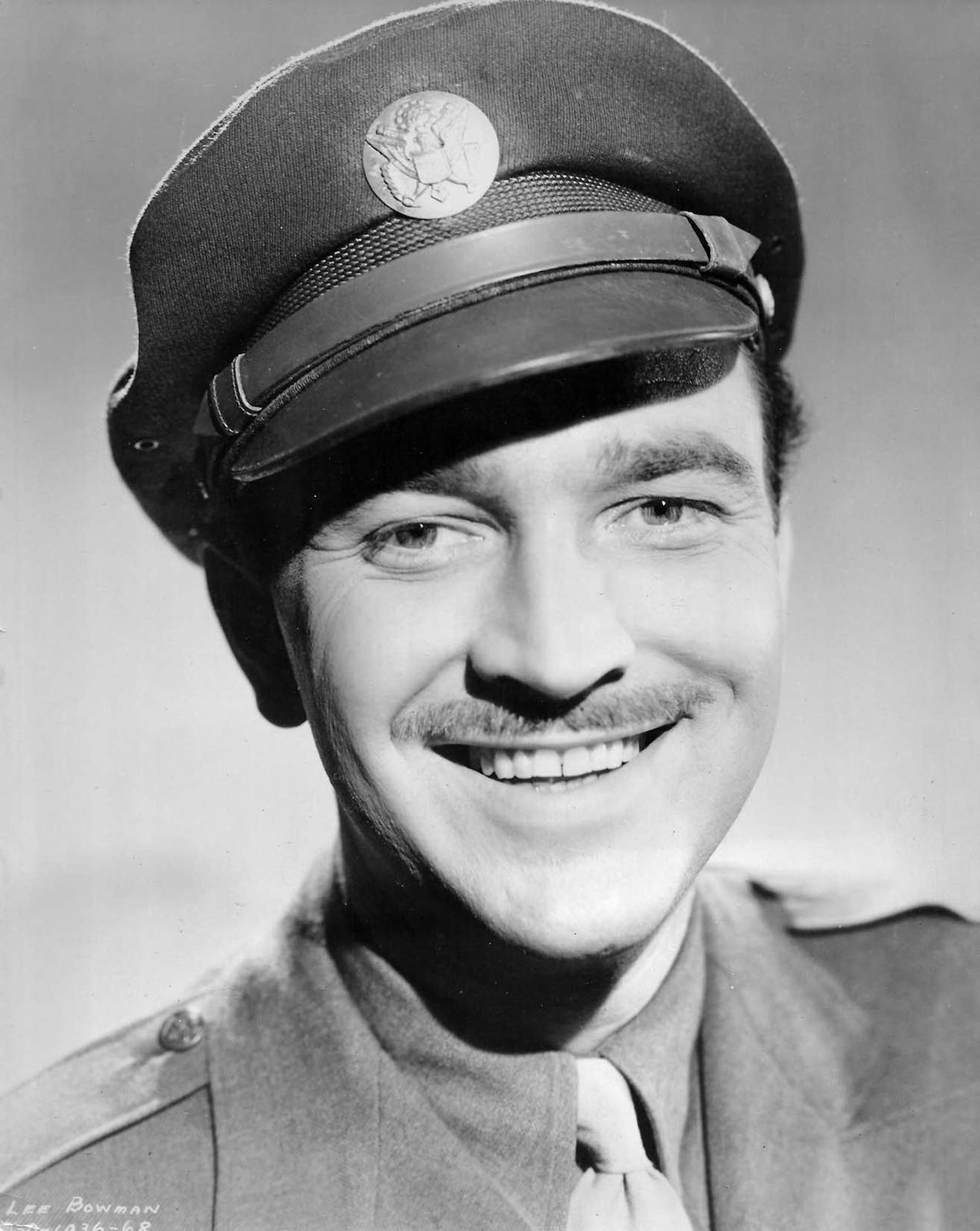
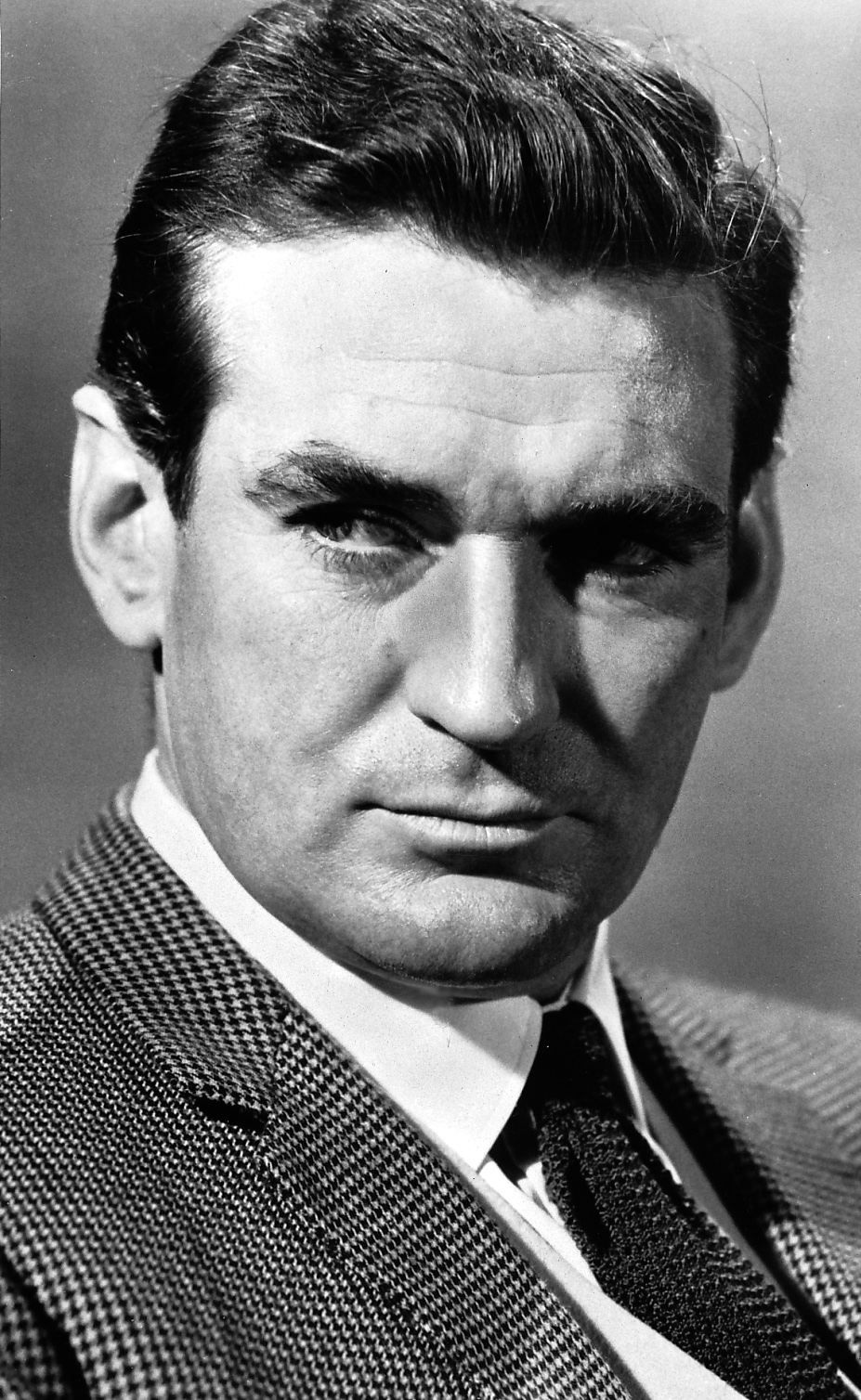
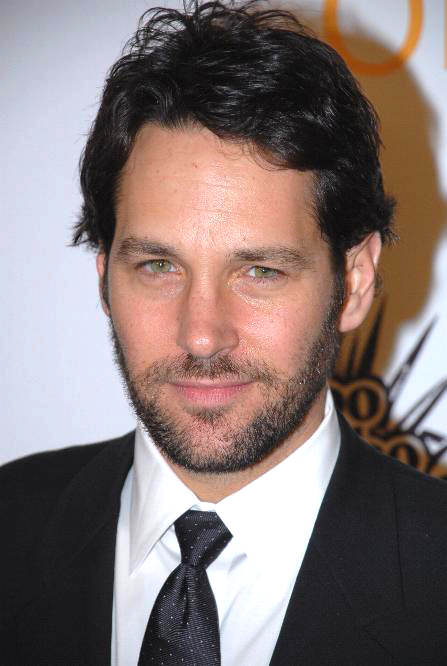
Lee Bowman (left), Rod Taylor (center), and Paul Rudd (right) have starred in television adaptations of the novel which were never released in theaters.

Lee Bowman portrayed Nick in a 1955 episode of the television series Robert Montgomery Presents adapting The Great Gatsby. Reviewers felt Bowman was given little to do with the role and observed the actor "made as much out of the cousin [Nick] as was available." Three years later, Rod Taylor played Nick in a 1958 episode of the television series Playhouse 90.

Paul Rudd played Nick in the 2000 television adaptation. Produced on a limited budget, the 2000 television adaptation greatly suffered from low production values. This TV adaptation received overwhelmingly negative reviews, although Paul Rudd's performance received praise.

=== Radio ===
In October 2008, the BBC World Service broadcast an abridged 10-part reading of the story, read from the view of Nick Carraway by Trevor White. In 2012, Bryan Dick played Carraway in a two-part BBC Radio 4 Classic Serial production.

=== List ===
Year	Title	Actor	Format	Distributor	Rotten Tomatoes	Metacritic
1926	The Great Gatsby	Ned Wever	Stage	Broadway (Ambassador Theatre)	—N/a	—N/a
1926	The Great Gatsby	Neil Hamilton	Film	Paramount Pictures	55% (22 reviews)	—N/a
1949	The Great Gatsby	Macdonald Carey	Film	Paramount Pictures	33% (9 reviews)	—N/a
1950	The Great Gatsby	Dana Andrews	Radio	Family Hour of Stars	—N/a	—N/a
1955	The Great Gatsby	Lee Bowman	Television	Robert Montgomery Presents	—N/a	—N/a
1958	The Great Gatsby	Rod Taylor	Television	Playhouse 90	—N/a	—N/a
1974	The Great Gatsby	Sam Waterston	Film	Paramount Pictures	39% (36 reviews)	43 (5 reviews)
1999	The Great Gatsby	Dwayne Croft	Opera	New York Metropolitan Opera	—N/a	—N/a
2000	The Great Gatsby	Paul Rudd	Television	A&E Television Networks	—N/a	—N/a
2006	The Great Gatsby	Matthew Amendt	Stage	Guthrie Theater	—N/a	—N/a
2012	The Great Gatsby	Bryan Dick	Radio	BBC Radio 4	—N/a	—N/a
2013	The Great Gatsby	Tobey Maguire	Film	Warner Bros. Pictures	48% (301 reviews)	55 (45 reviews)
2023	The Great Gatsby	Noah J. Ricketts	Musical	Broadway (Paper Mill Playhouse/Broadway Theatre)	—N/a	—N/a
2024	Gatsby: An American Myth	Ben Levi Ross	Musical	American Repertory Theater	—N/a	—N/a
2025	The Gatsby Gambit	Claire Anderson-Wheeler	Novel	Viking	—N/a	—N/a

== See also ==
- Adaptations and portrayals of F. Scott Fitzgerald
- Nick (novel), a 2021 prequel to The Great Gatsby centering on Nick Carraway
