= May Day (short story) =

1920 short story by F. Scott Fitzgerald

- Short story by F. Scott Fitzgerald
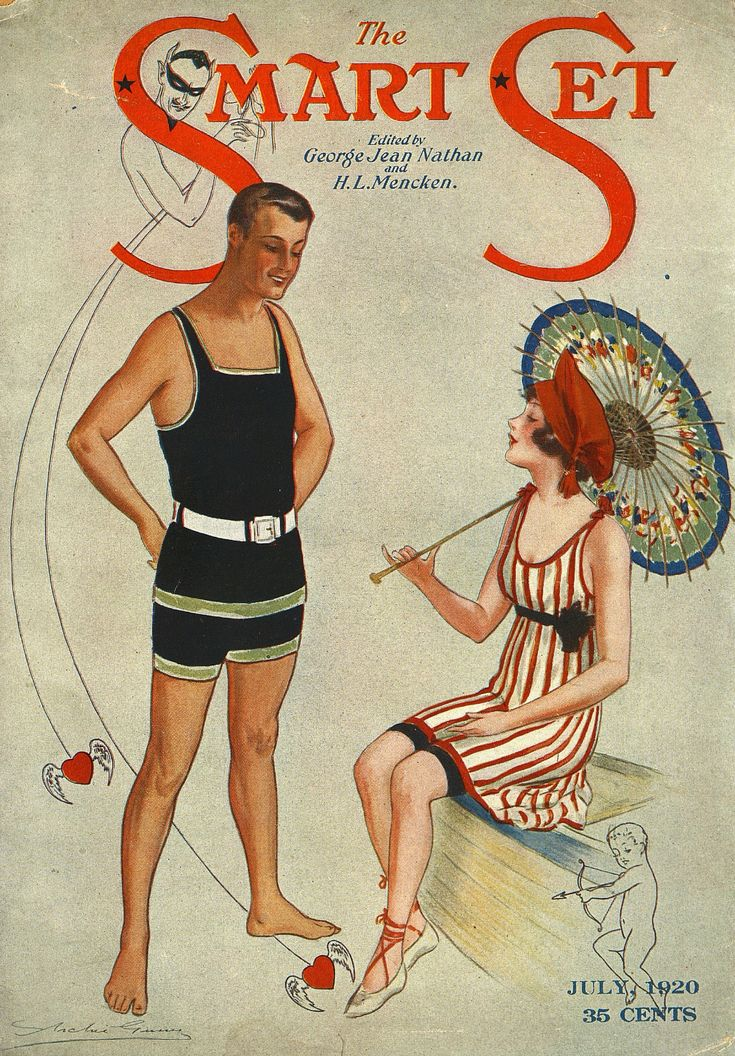
- First published in the July 1920 issue of The Smart Set

Text available at Wikisource
- Country: United States
- Language: English
- Genre: Short story

Publication
- Published in: The Smart Set
- Publication type: Periodical
- Publisher: Smart Set Company, Inc.
- Media type: Print (Magazine, Hardback & Paperback)
- Publication date: July 1, 1920

"May Day" is a short story by American writer F. Scott Fitzgerald published in The Smart Set in July 1920. The story was included in his 1922 short story collection Tales of the Jazz Age. The plot follows a blithe coterie of privileged Yale alumni who meet for a social dance during the May Day riots of 1919. The riots erupted in multiple cities including New York City and Cleveland when thousands of socialists protested the conviction of Eugene Debs and mounted police suppressed the large rallies.

Fitzgerald based the story on events that occurred in New York City. He recalled that mounted police brutally attacked demobilized World War I veterans peacefully listening to socialist orators. This excessive force led Fitzgerald to question whether the country was any better than despotic regimes in Europe. In his 1931 essay, "Echoes of the Jazz Age," Fitzgerald ascribed this event as triggering a wave of political cynicism among younger Americans and ushering in the hedonism of the Jazz Age.

== Plot summary ==
The story opens with an influx of recently decommissioned World War I soldiers descending on New York. Gordon Sterrett is an army veteran on his way to the Biltmore Hotel to meet his friend from college, Philip Dean. Sterrett informs him that he needs to borrow money because he is unemployed and is the victim of a blackmailing plot by a woman named Jewel Hudson. Sterrett needs $300 to pay off Jewel. He envisions pursuing a career as an artist. Dean, however, is not convinced, characterizing Sterrett as "bankrupt—morally as well as financially."

Dean invites Sterrett to breakfast, where they discuss a Yale alumni dance hosted by the Gamma Psi fraternity. Dean pays for the breakfast and offers Sterrett $80. They agree to meet at the fraternity dance.

Two other demobilized soldiers, Carroll Key and Gus Rose, are introduced. Key and Rose are described as "ugly and ill-nourished." A Jewish man preaches on the street about the deleterious effects of the war before a group of soldiers assaults him. The group increases in size, marching down Sixth Avenue toward Tenth Street. Key and Rose join the group but abandon it in search of booze. They walk to Delmonico's restaurant, where Key's brother, George, works as a waiter. George takes them to a storeroom that is connected to the ballroom where the fraternity dance is taking place.

Edith Bradin, Sterrett's ex-girlfriend, is at the dance. She seeks to dump her date, Peter Himmel, and meet up with Sterrett. When she sees him, however, she is dismayed by his appearance. Himmel, realizing that Edith has lost interest in him, mingles with Key and Rose, who have joined the party and are intoxicated. Edith leaves the party to meet with her brother, Henry, a reporter at the radical "New York Trumpet", at the newspaper office. Edith feels that her brother disapproves of her way of life, since, as a socialist, he wants a world where such parties will be impossible. However, he tells her to enjoy life as long as she is young. Jewel Hudson arrives at the dance looking for Sterrett. Sterrett informs her that he could not obtain the $300. They leave the party together.

At the newspaper office, Henry and his co-worker Bartholomew explain to Edith the violent nature of the conflict taking place on the streets. The soldiers, though they are against war protesters and socialists, "don't know what they want, or what they hate, or what they like." The group of soldiers, of which Key is a part, attacks the office. The reporters are called traitors. Key is thrown out of a window to his death. Henry's leg is broken.

Intoxicated members from the party go to Child's restaurant after the dance. This group, like Dean and Himmel, is made up of the wealthy. Rose is not. He learns that his friend Key has died. Jewel and Sterrett show up at the restaurant as chaos erupts. Unlike the group of soldiers, this gathering is made up of the well-off. Himmel and Dean are thrown out of the restaurant for threatening a waiter and starting a food fight.

After "breakfast and liquor," Himmel and Dean return to the Biltmore after seeing Edith who does not want to speak with them. Sterrett awakens intoxicated in a seedy hotel on Sixth Avenue. He learns that he and Jewel had gotten married the night before. He then leaves the hotel to purchase a gun and returns to his rented room on East Street, where, leaning across a table containing his art supplies, he shoots himself in the head.

== Background and composition ==
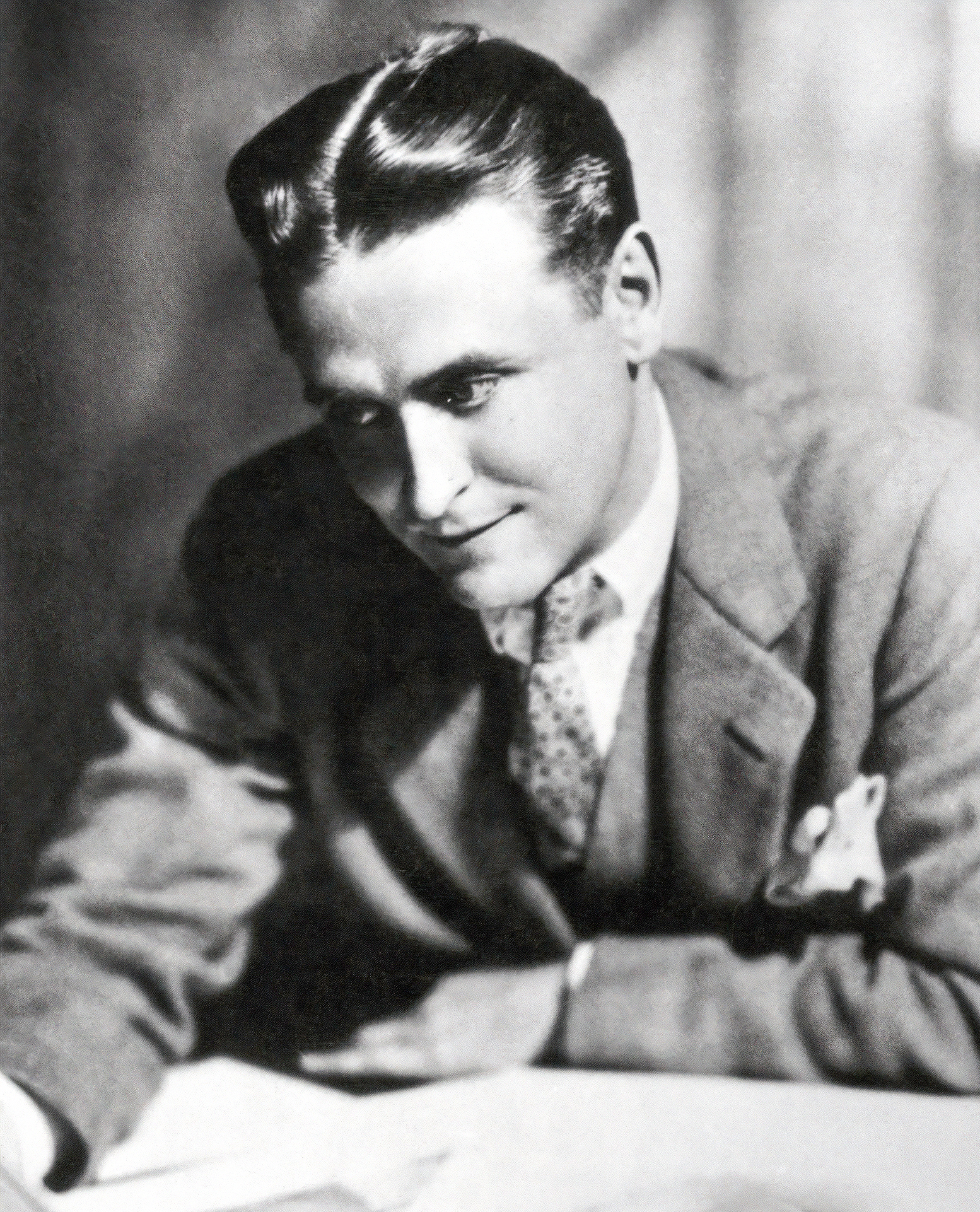
F. Scott Fitzgerald

Fitzgerald based "May Day" on events that transpired in New York City circa 1918–1919. An assault by an enraged mob upon the offices of the socialist newspaper The New York Call inspired the similar incident in the story, and the death of a young Princetonian acquaintance who shot himself inspired Gordon Sterrett's suicide. He wrote:

"This . . . unpleasant tale . . . relates a series of events which took place in the spring of the previous year. Each of the three events made a great impression upon me. In life they were unrelated, except by the general hysteria of that spring, which inaugurated the Age of Jazz, but in my story I have tried, unsuccessfully I fear, to weave them into a pattern—a pattern which would give the effect of those months in New York as they appeared to at least one member of what was then the younger generation."

In his non-fiction essay, "Echoes of the Jazz Age," Fitzgerald recalls that young Americans were shocked by how mounted police officers brutally attacked World War I veterans peacefully listening to orators denounce the conviction of Eugene Debs. The excessive use of force by police officers against the demobilized war veterans prompted younger Americans like Fitzgerald to question whether their country was any better than the despotic regimes in Europe. Fitzgerald ascribed the resulting political cynicism among American youth as a collective reaction to this pivotal event that marked the dawn of the Jazz Age.

"When the police rode down the demobilized country boys gaping at the orators in Madison Square, it was the sort of measure bound to alienate the more intelligent young men from the prevailing order. We didn't remember anything about the Bill of Rights until Mencken began plugging it, but we did know that such tyranny belonged in the jittery little countries of South Europe. If goose-livered business men had this effect on the government, then maybe we had gone to war for J. P. Morgan's loans after all. But, because we were tired of Great Causes, there was no more than a short outbreak of moral indignation... The events of 1919 left us cynical rather than revolutionary..."

Fitzgerald sold "May Day" directly to H. L. Mencken's The Smart Set magazine before he had a literary agent (later Harold Ober). He did not attempt to submit the story to The Saturday Evening Post or any other magazines as he feared "the material was too strong or realistic for the slicks."

== Critical analysis ==
The story is noteworthy for its length, the familiar themes of lost youth and wealth, and two distinct yet interrelated plots. Fitzgerald would revisit these themes throughout his literary career.

During the story, a crowd beats up a Jewish man as he expounds socialist rhetoric. Fitzgerald, however, was not an anti-semite, and his characterization of the Jewish man can be seen as a commentary of the brutality of the crowd contrasted with the man's wit and fervor.

A major issue in the story is the class differences between the affluent Yale graduates and the working-class soldiers, who are discharged from military service and facing an uncertain civilian life and the prospect of unemployment. The socialists try to reach out to the soldiers and tell them their plight is due to capitalism, but the soldiers react violently towards the socialists themselves.

The story has been compared to J.D. Salinger's "A Perfect Day for Bananafish."

== See also ==
- "Echoes of the Jazz Age"
