= The Lees of Happiness =

1920 short story by F. Scott Fitzgerald

- Short story by F. Scott Fitzgerald

Text available at Wikisource
- Country: United States
- Language: English

Publication
- Publisher: The Chicago Tribune
- Media type: Print (magazine)
- Publication date: December 12, 1920

"The Lees of Happiness" is a work of short fiction by American writer F. Scott Fitzgerald that first appeared in the Chicago Tribune on December 12, 1920. The story follows a young wife's eleven-year devotion to her paralyzed spouse. The story was first collected in Tales of the Jazz Age (1922) published by Charles Scribner's Sons.

== Plot ==
"The Lees of Happiness" is written from a third-person omniscient point of view. The narrator first provides vignettes derived from notices in newspapers, dating to around 1900, for two of the three principal protagonists. Jeffery Curtain, a young man, had been a modestly talented, but obscure, novelist and short story writer: after 1908, the public record suggests he has ceased to publish. Around the same period, when the Gibson Girl was a feminine ideal among the American middle-class, Roxanne Milbank was a minor star in popular theatre: her photograph in a trade paper for actors depicts a young lady of uncommon beauty.

The newspaper record reports that she retired from the stage upon her marriage to Jeffrey Curtain. Blissfully in love, the couple travels around the western US and Mexico for a year in an extended honeymoon. They settle on a small, semi-rural estate outside of Chicago near other members of their social class. The marriage is idyllic.

The couple is visited for a week by a close friend of Jeffery's, Harry Cromwell. Harry is not accompanied by his wife of two years, Kitty: Jeffery suspects that his friend is having demoralizing marital difficulties, complicated by the fact that the pair have a young son.

Though entirely ignorant of the culinary arts, Roxanne prepares a batch of biscuits from a recipe provided by the household's hired cook. The biscuits are a disaster, "decorative," but inedible. Jeffery, in an effort to salvage them, nails the hardtack in a row along the wall of the library. Roxanne is praised for her faux-artistry. Harry reflects upon Roxanne's good-natured response to her failure with his prideful wife Kitty, and is troubled by the contrast.

Shortly after Harry's return to the city, Jeffery begins to complain of headaches. The first indication that he is seriously ill occurs when Roxanne gently touches his shoulder during a social gathering at their home: he reacts as if attacked, slapping her arm away. Both spouses are shocked: Roxanne frightened and hurt, Jeffery dismayed at what he has done. The guests suspect something perhaps sinister and depart. The incident is the first manifestation of a brain tumor. When Jeffery falls into a coma, unable to speak or move, Roxanne serves as his dedicated caregiver.

Six months later, on a brief visit to Chicago, Roxanne makes a courtesy call to Kitty Cromwell. Roxanne is struck by the filthy condition of the apartment. Kitty is superficially social, but vulgar; her son is clearly unbathed and uncared for. Kitty displays her meretricious lingerie which Roxanne finds repellent; she departs shaken. The encounter has provided her with a sympathetic insight into Harry's life.

Medical specialists attempt to treat Jeffery, without success. On a visit to see his friend, Harry reveals to Roxanne his collapsing marriage: Kitty has left him, taking his son. He is distraught. Both Harry and Roxanne recognize their mutual suffering in the face of events that have descended upon them. As the years pass, Roxanne continues to lavish an inordinate, perhaps unhealthy, amount of love on Jeffery, despite the fact that he is clinically, if not biologically, deceased. After eleven years in vegetable-like state, Jeffery dies. Roxanne, despite the ordeal, is still a healthy, attractive and vigorous woman. She is uncertain as to her future. Harry has been divorced from Kitty for eight years; their son is grown and at college.

Years pass and both Roxanne and Harry are in their middle-age. He is devoted to the former wife of his best friend, but refrains from deepening the relationship. As dear friends, they both continue to mourn Jeffery's passing and celebrate his life.

== Background ==
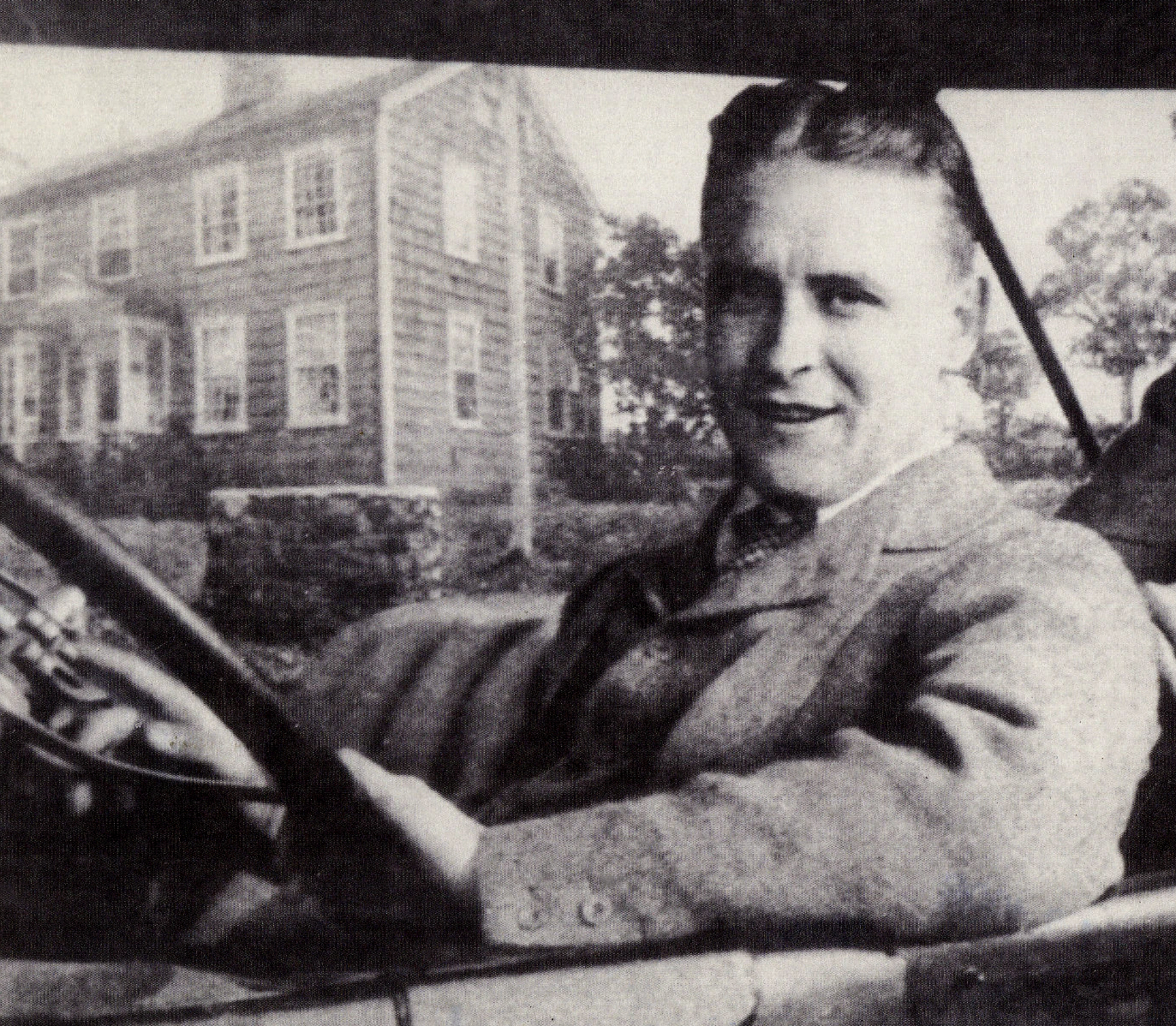
F. Scott Fitzgerald

The Chicago Tribune paid $750 for the story and featured it in the "Blue Ribbon Fiction" section of the December 12, 1920 Sunday edition. In the annotated table of contents which Fitzgerald introduces the stories collected in Tales of the Jazz Age (1922), he placed "The Lees of Happiness" under the category "Unclassified Masterpieces":

Of this story I can say it came to me in an irresistible form, crying to be written. It will be accused perhaps of being a mere piece of sentimentality, but, as I saw it, it was a great deal more. If, therefore, it lacks the ring of sincerity, or even of tragedy, the fault rests not with the theme but with my handling of it.

Fitzgerald added "facetiously" that the work had been honored with the "quadruple gold laurel leaf", a fictitious literary award.

== Themes ==
Unlike many of Fiztgerald's flapper-themed stories of the 1920s involving youthful, collegiate protagonists, "The Lees of Happiness" involves three people the author follows into middle-age: Harry Cromwell, Jeffery Curtain, a writer, and an actress, Roxanne Milbank. Each protagonist experiences a humiliating or tragic loss of their respective spouses. The story anticipates the theme of marital discord that preoccupied Fitzgerald during the Great Depression. Literary critic John Kuehl writes: ‘The tragic marriage motif that will dominate Fitzgerald's fiction in the 1930s and that will culmination with his novel Tender is the Night (1935) has already surfaced in "The Lees of Happiness."
