= Flaming Youth (film) =

1923 film by John Francis Dillon

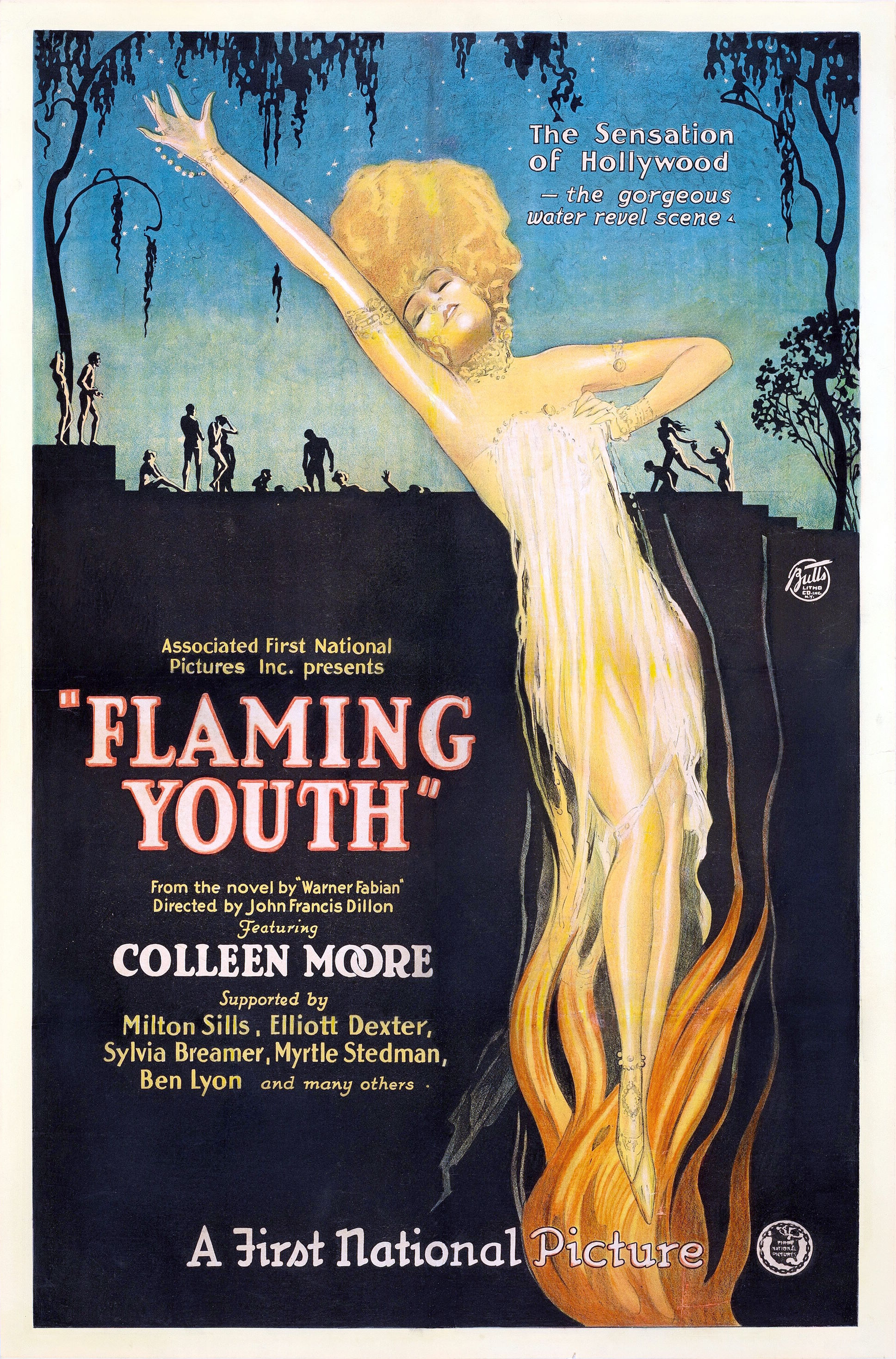
- Theatrical release poster
- Directed by: John Francis Dillon
- Written by: Harry O. Hoyt (scenario)
- Based on: Flaming Youth; 1923 novel by Samuel Hopkins Adams
- Produced by: John McCormick
- Starring: Colleen Moore; Milton Sills; Elliott Dexter; Sylvia Breamer; Myrtle Stedman; Ben Lyon
- Cinematography: James Van Trees
- Edited by: Arthur Tavares
- Production company: John McCormick Productions
- Distributed by: Associated First National
- Release date: November 12, 1923 (United States)
- Running time: 90 minutes
- Country: United States
- Language: Silent (English intertitles)

Flaming Youth is a 1923 American silent drama film directed by John Francis Dillon and starring Colleen Moore and Milton Sills, based on the novel of the same name by Samuel Hopkins Adams. Associated First National produced and distributed the film. In his retrospective essay "Echoes of the Jazz Age", writer F. Scott Fitzgerald cited Flaming Youth as the only film that captured the sexual revolution of the Jazz Age. The film is now considered partially lost. One 11 minute reel survives and is housed at the Library of Congress.

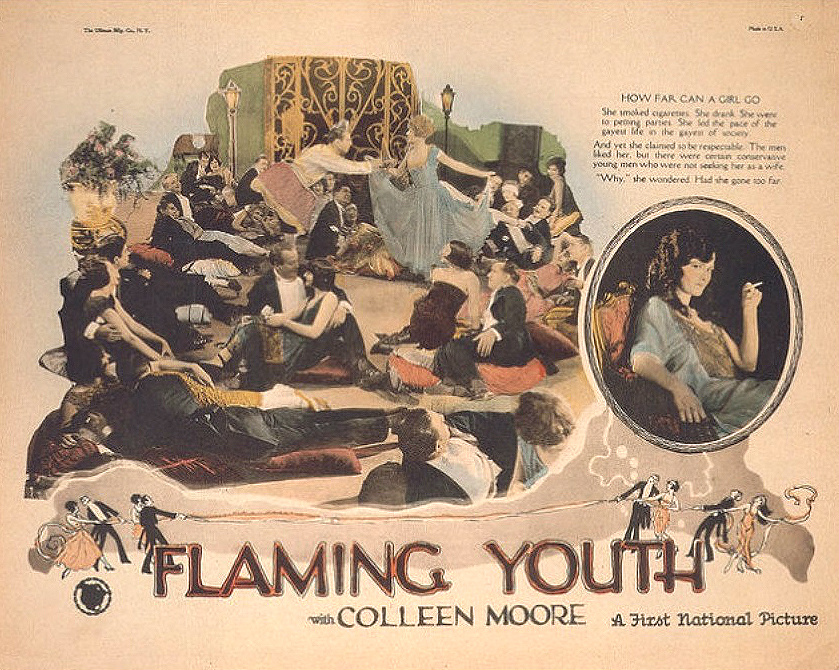
Lobby card

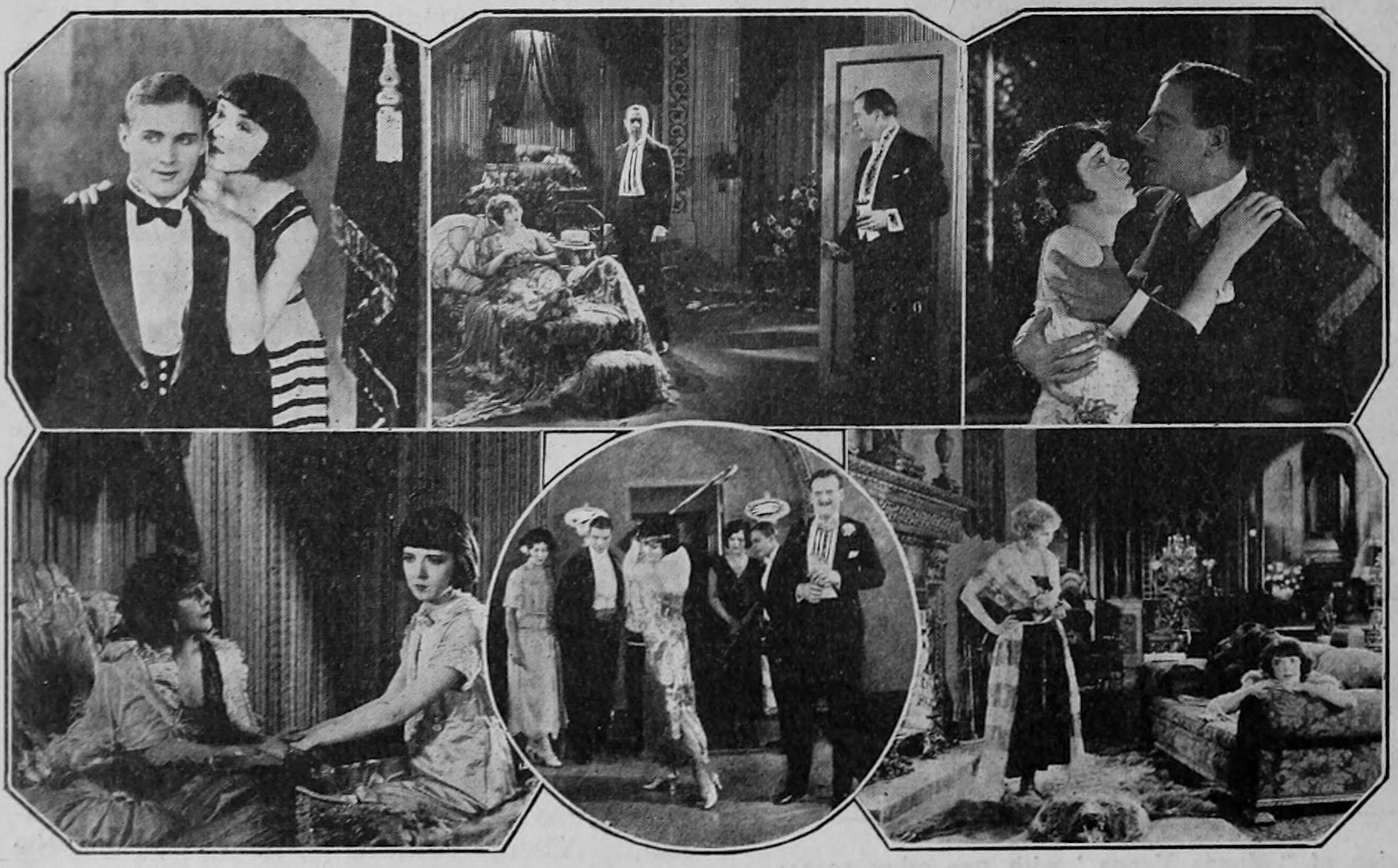
Scenes from the film

== Plot ==
When Mona Frentiss dies, she has her confidante "Doctor Bobs" watch over her family, especially her youngest daughter, Patricia. The family has been raised in a most unconventional manner, with Mona having a much younger lover and the father Ralph keeping his own lover on the side. As Patricia grows older, she attracts the attention of her mother's former lover, Cary Scott, who is much older than Patricia (who in the book is in her early to mid-teens). Patricia tempts fate with her wild ways, nearly loses her virtue to a musician aboard an ocean-going boat, and is saved in time by Cary. Realizing that he is the man for her, Patricia settles down into an experimental marriage.

== Cast ==
- Colleen Moore as Patricia Frentiss
- Milton Sills as Cary Scott
- Elliott Dexter as Dr. Bobs
- Sylvia Breamer as Dee Fentriss
- Myrtle Stedman as Mona Fentriss
- Betty Francisco as Connie Fentriss
- Phillips Smalley as Ralph Fentriss
- Walter McGrail as Jamieson James
- Ben Lyon as Monty Standish
- George Barraud as Fred Browning
- John Patrick as Warren Graves
- Gino Corrado as Leno Stenak
- Gertrude Astor as Annie
- Michael Dark as Sidney
- Rosalind Byrne as Fabian Flapper (uncredited)

== Background ==
Prior to Flaming Youth, several films used the flapper cultural phenomenon as subject matter, such as The Flapper (1920) starring Olive Thomas, but the financial success of Flaming Youth made it the movie credited with launching a cycle of movies about flappers and helping Colleen Moore be seen as the originator of the screen flapper.

The film's marketing emphasized the racier aspects of the story, and a "skinny-dipping" sequence shot in silhouette (which still largely survives in the Library of Congress) was used in the film's advertising extensively. The ads also boasted "neckers, petters, white kisses, red kisses, pleasure mad daughters, [and] sensation craving mothers." The book contained adult subjects which were largely glossed over in the film. To counter potential negative backlash, the filmmakers injected a good deal of humor into their adaptation so that many audiences thought the film was actually a burlesque of the whole flapper movement when, in fact, it was intended to be a dramatic film.

== Reception ==
=== Popular success ===
The public reaction to the film was enthusiastic, and it firmly fixed a new kind of female behavior in the public's imagination. In his retrospective essay "Echoes of the Jazz Age", author F. Scott Fitzgerald cited Flaming Youth as the only motion picture that captured the sexual revolution of the Jazz Age. He lamented that its runaway success prompted "Hollywood hacks" to create a number of similar but less daring films and to run "the theme into its cinematographic grave." He also emphasized the fact that Flaming Youth persuaded certain moralistic Americans that their young girls could be "seduced without being ruined." Fitzgerald also praised Colleen Moore's performance in the film, remarking that: "I was the spark that lit up Flaming Youth, Colleen Moore was the torch."

=== Critical reviews ===
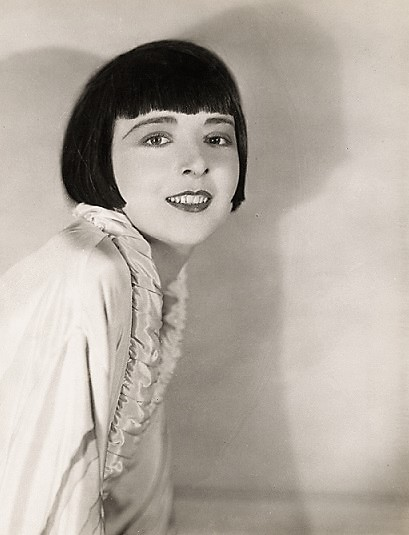
Colleen Moore with "Dutch Bob" haircut, 1927 publicity photo

While Flaming Youth was successful enough to be held over in most American cities, reactions from film critics were mixed. The January 12, 1924, issue of the Exhibitor's Trade Review cites a review from the Chicago News which called the film "one of the best-told screen novels that has come along", and another review from the Cincinnati Enquirer in which the critic pointed out that the film was not completely faithful to the book. He added that "throughout the production, scarcely a single admirable character appears, and the audience is regaled with the antics of a lot of childish adults and adulterated children. Consequently, the members of the cast, though many of them are talented, work against unfair handicaps." A reviewer for the Indiana Star wrote, "In spite of an awkward story, Miss Moore contributes much merriment to the occasion and Elliott Dexter and Milton Sills lend the frontier element of the film a certain degree of stability."

A critic for The New York Times wrote, "Colleen Moore gives a vivid performance of the jazz-devoted novice once she gets her hold of the theme. There are moments in the beginning when her rendition is a little artificial. But after her awkward trip downstairs in exotic pajamas—which are not really graceful—she lives the part of a pert young thing, whose hair is cut with a bang on the forehead, whose eyes are full of mischief and whose arms are long and slender." The New York Times critic also described Milton Sills as "sympathetic" and Myrtle Stedman as "charming."

=== Flapper archetype ===
Biographer Jeanine Basinger in Silent Stars (1999) reports that "the movie flapper really came into focus in 1923, when Colleen Moore"—heretofore playing ingenues "with no distinctive traits"—appeared in Flaming Youth, and "she more than anyone became the prototype."

The flapper signaled the transition from the pre-World War I feminine ideals, such as the Gibson Girl, to the post-war modern era. She acted out the changes that were taking place "in fashion, sex, social awareness, and politics." Basinger describes the iconic image of the flapper: "flat-chested and angular, big-eyed and lively, and with her hair cut short, very short, straight across the bottom and topped off with bangs"—the distinctive "Dutch Boy bob". Basinger insists that the Dutch Boy was popularized by Colleen Moore, and not by her contemporary Louise Brooks, whose hairdo appropriates the "trademark" flapper cut.

== Censorship ==
Films during that period were subject to censorship by state and city censor boards. The Board of Motion Picture Review of Worcester, Massachusetts, banned the showing of Flaming Youth, even though it had been passed by the state board.

When Flaming Youth debuted in Québec cinemas in January 1924, Judge Philippe-Auguste Choquette was petitioned by a delegation of Montreal women to ban the motion picture. It asserted the foreign American film was "obscene" and morally corrosive to young Canadian girls. In response, Judge Choquette ordered all film prints to be seized and all lobby cards to be confiscated. Additionally, theater owners and projectionists who exhibited the film were arrested. Those highly publicized actions caused a legal court case to ensue over the film. The case regarding the film was transferred to Judge Arthur Lachance of the Court of Sessions. Lachance privately viewed the film and deemed its content to be "immoral." Shortly thereafter, the Canadian board of censors rescinded its previous approval of the film and Flaming Youth could no longer be shown at any cinema in Canada "without violating the Canadian criminal code."

== See also ==
- List of incomplete or partially lost films

== Sources ==
- Basinger, Jeanine (1999). Silent Stars. New York: Alfred A. Knopf. ISBN 978-0-679-43840-3 – via Internet Archive.
- Bennett, Carl (2015). "Flaming Youth". Silent Era.
- "Critics Disagree on 'Flaming Youth'". Exhibitor's Trade Review. 15 (7). Chicago, Illinois: 39. January 12, 1924 – via Internet Archive.
- Fitzgerald, F. Scott. (2009). "Echoes of the Jazz Age". In Wilson, Edmund (ed.). The Crack-Up. New York City: New Directions Publishing. pp. 13–22. ISBN 978-0-8112-1820-7.
- "'Flaming Youth' Arrests In Quebec and Film Seized". Variety. Los Angeles, California. January 17, 1924. p. 19 – via Internet Archive.
- "'Flaming Youth' Is Immoral, Says Judge". Variety. Los Angeles, California. January 31, 1924. p. 17 – via Internet Archive.
- Gebhart, Myrtel (May 18, 1924). "Colleen Forswears New Role". Los Angeles Times. Los Angeles, California – via Newspapers.com.
- "Marble Hearts and Halls". The New York Times. New York City. November 26, 1923.
- Menefee, David W. (2014). "Lost Films Wanted: Flaming Youth". The Great Stars. Archived from the original on December 25, 2014.
- Pitz, Mary Lynne (September 26, 2010). "Olive Thomas, the Original 'Flapper' and a Mon Valley native, still fascinates". Pittsburgh Post-Gazette. Pittsburgh, Pennsylvania.
- Ross, Sarah (April 2010). "Screening the Modern Girl: Intermediality in the Adaption of Flaming Youth". Modernism/Modernity. 17 (2). Baltimore, Maryland: Johns Hopkins University Press: 271–290. doi:10.1353/mod.0.0209. PMID 20653110. S2CID 41051462.
- Savage, Jon (2007). Teenage: The Creation of Youth Culture. New York: Viking Press. p. 205. ISBN 978-0-6700-3837-4 – via Internet Archive.
