= Tales of the Jazz Age =

1922 short story collection by F. Scott Fitzgerald

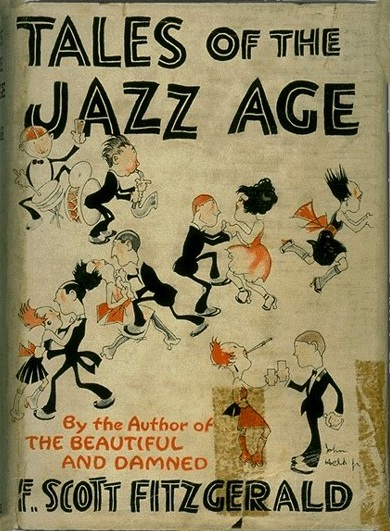
- The cover of the 1922 first edition
- Author: F. Scott Fitzgerald
- Cover artist: John Held, Jr.
- Language: English
- Genre: Short stories
- Publisher: Charles Scribner's Sons
- Publication date: September 22, 1922
- Publication place: United States
- Media type: Print (hardcover & paperback)
- ISBN: 1-4341-0001-4

Tales of the Jazz Age is a 1922 collection of 11 short stories by American writer F. Scott Fitzgerald. Divided into three separate parts, it includes one of his better-known short stories, "The Curious Case of Benjamin Button". All of the stories had first appeared, independently, in either Metropolitan Magazine, The Saturday Evening Post, Smart Set, Collier's, the Chicago Sunday Tribune, or Vanity Fair.

Due to its adult theme, Fitzgerald did not consider the short story "May Day" to be suitable for the family-oriented readership favored by the Saturday Evening Post. He offered this "masterpiece" to H. L. Mencken and George Jean Nathan, editors at The Smart Set, where it appeared in the July 1920 issue. Fitzgerald termed the story "this somewhat unpleasant tale".

== Contents ==
Fitzgerald provided his own annotated table of contents for the collection, providing commentary on each story. The works are presented in three categories: My Last Flappers, Fantasies, and Unclassified Masterpieces. The original periodical publication and date are indicated below.

My Last Flappers

- "The Jelly-Bean" (Metropolitan Magazine, October 1920)
- "The Camel's Back" (Saturday Evening Post, April 24, 1920)
- "May Day" (The Smart Set, July 1920)
- "Porcelain and Pink" (The Smart Set, January 1920)

Fantasies

- "The Diamond as Big as the Ritz" (The Smart Set, June 1922)
- "The Curious Case of Benjamin Button" (Collier's, May 27, 1922)
- "Tarquin of Cheapside" (The Smart Set, February 1921)
- "O Russet Witch!" (Metropolitan Magazine, February 1921)

Unclassified Masterpieces

- "The Lees of Happiness" (Chicago Sunday Tribune, December 12, 1920)
- "Mr. Icky" (The Smart Set, March 1920)
- "Jemina" (Vanity Fair, January 1921)

== Reception ==
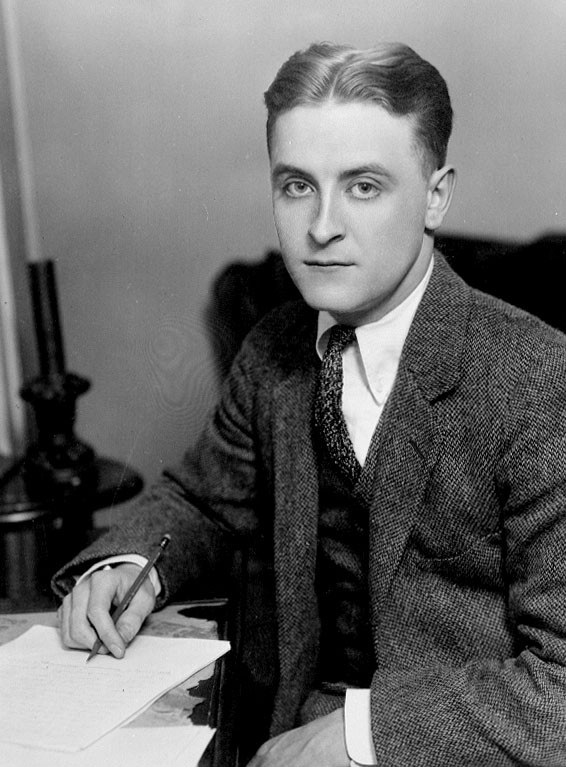
F. Scott Fitzgerald

Critic Hildegarde Hawthorne in The New York Times, October 29, 1922, commented on Fitzgerald's contemporary identification as a writer for slick magazines, in particular The Saturday Evening Post. Hawthorne wrote that stories "give too much of the effect of samples... The book is more like a magazine than a collection of stories by one man, arranged by an editor to suit all tastes and meant to be thrown away after reading."

Hawthorne closes with an upbeat assessment of Fitzgerald's potential as a fiction writer: "These stories are announced as beginning in the writer's second manner. They certainly show a development in his art, a new turn... this 'second manner' is surely the outcropping of a rich vein that may hold much wealth."

== Critical appraisal ==
"F. Scott Fitzgerald's short stories remain a misunderstood and underrated aspect of his career. They have been dismissed as hackwork and condemned for impeding his serious work. Certainly they are uneven; but Fitzgerald's best stories are among the best in American literature."

— Biographer Matthew J. Bruccoli in The Short Stories of F. Scott Fitzgerald (1989)

According to biographer Kenneth Eble, Fitzgerald characterized some of the short fiction as "cheap and without the spontaneity of my first work." Eble adds that "Tales of the Jazz Age suffers badly from the inclusion of some early writing which might better have remained in The Nassau Literary Review, where it first appeared."

Several stories in Tales of the Jazz Age are notable for their "authorial self-consciousness" registered through Fitzgerald's editorial remarks directed towards the reader. Literary Critic John Kuehl writes:

[T]he author's voice tends to intrude upon and dominate the stories, whether narrated in the third-person or in the no less omniscient first-person. The characters tell neither their own stories nor other people's tales; with few exceptions, they are objects viewed through authorial eyes instead of filters through whom the action unfolds.

Kuehl argues that this "egotistical foregrounding" tends to squander Fitzgerald's literary talents in favor of an intrusive approach that fails to adequately dramatize his narrative.

== Theme ==
Fitzgerald's earliest professional stories largely concerned inherited wealth and the "indolent rich." These preoccupations transitioned, however, toward narratives involving a broader spectrum of social classes, including "businessmen, writers, performers, priests and white-collar workers." Critic John Kuehl reports that this emerging focus on essentially democratic concerns "reaches its apotheosis in 'May Day,' where various socioeconomic classes meet."
