= Echoes of the Jazz Age =

1931 essay by F. Scott Fitzgerald

It was an age of miracles, it was an age of art, it was an age of excess, and it was an age of satire.

— F. Scott Fitzgerald, "Echoes of the Jazz Age"

"Echoes of the Jazz Age" is a short essay by American writer F. Scott Fitzgerald that was first published in Scribner's Magazine in November 1931. The essay analyzes the societal conditions in the United States which gave rise to the flowering of youth culture in the raucous historical era known as the Jazz Age and the subsequent events which led to the era's abrupt conclusion. The frequently anthologized essay represents an extended critique by Fitzgerald of 1920s hedonism and is regarded as one of Fitzgerald's finest non-fiction works.

The essay's contents reflect a number of Fitzgerald's opinions previously expressed in newspaper interviews. Fitzgerald had publicly rejected the argument that the meaningless destruction of World War I spawned the Jazz Age. Fitzgerald also did not believe the war affected the morality of younger Americans. He likewise rejected other popular claims that either Prohibition in the United States or the advent of motion pictures corrupted the morals of American youths.

Fitzgerald's essay instead posits various technological innovations and cultural trends as fostering the societal conditions which typified the Jazz Age. He attributes the era's sexual revolution to a combination of both Sigmund Freud's sexual theories gaining salience among young Americans and the invention of the automobile allowing youths to escape parental surveillance in order to engage in premarital sex. Echoing Voltaire's belief that novels influence social behavior, Fitzgerald cites the literary works by E. M. Hull, D. H. Lawrence, Radclyffe Hall, and others as influencing young Americans to question their sexual norms.

In the essay, Fitzgerald makes a critical and much-overlooked distinction between contemporary generations. In contrast to the older Lost Generation to which Gertrude Stein posited Fitzgerald and Ernest Hemingway belonged, Fitzgerald notes the Jazz Age generation were those Americans younger than himself who had been adolescents during World War I and were largely untouched by the conflict's psychological and material horrors. It was this hedonistic younger generation—and not the Lost Generation—which riveted the nation's attention upon their leisure activities and sparked a societal debate over their perceived immorality. After Fitzgerald's death in 1940, critic Edmund Wilson collected the essay in the 1945 anthology The Crack-Up.

The essay will enter the American public domain on January 1, 2027. (Note: Under R226596)

== Background ==
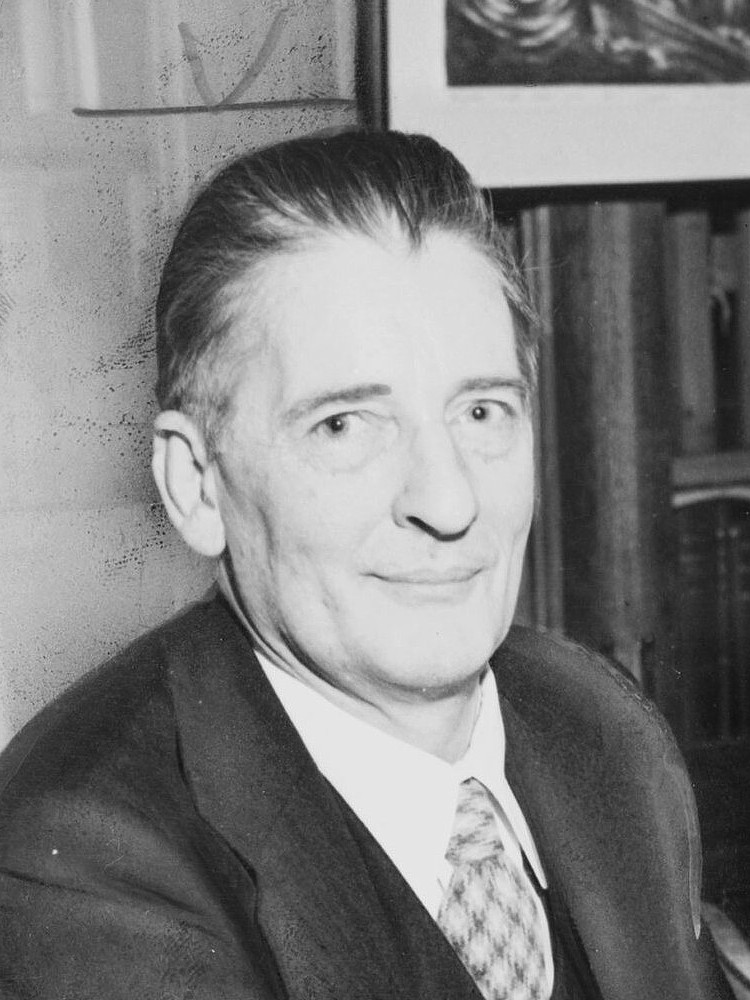
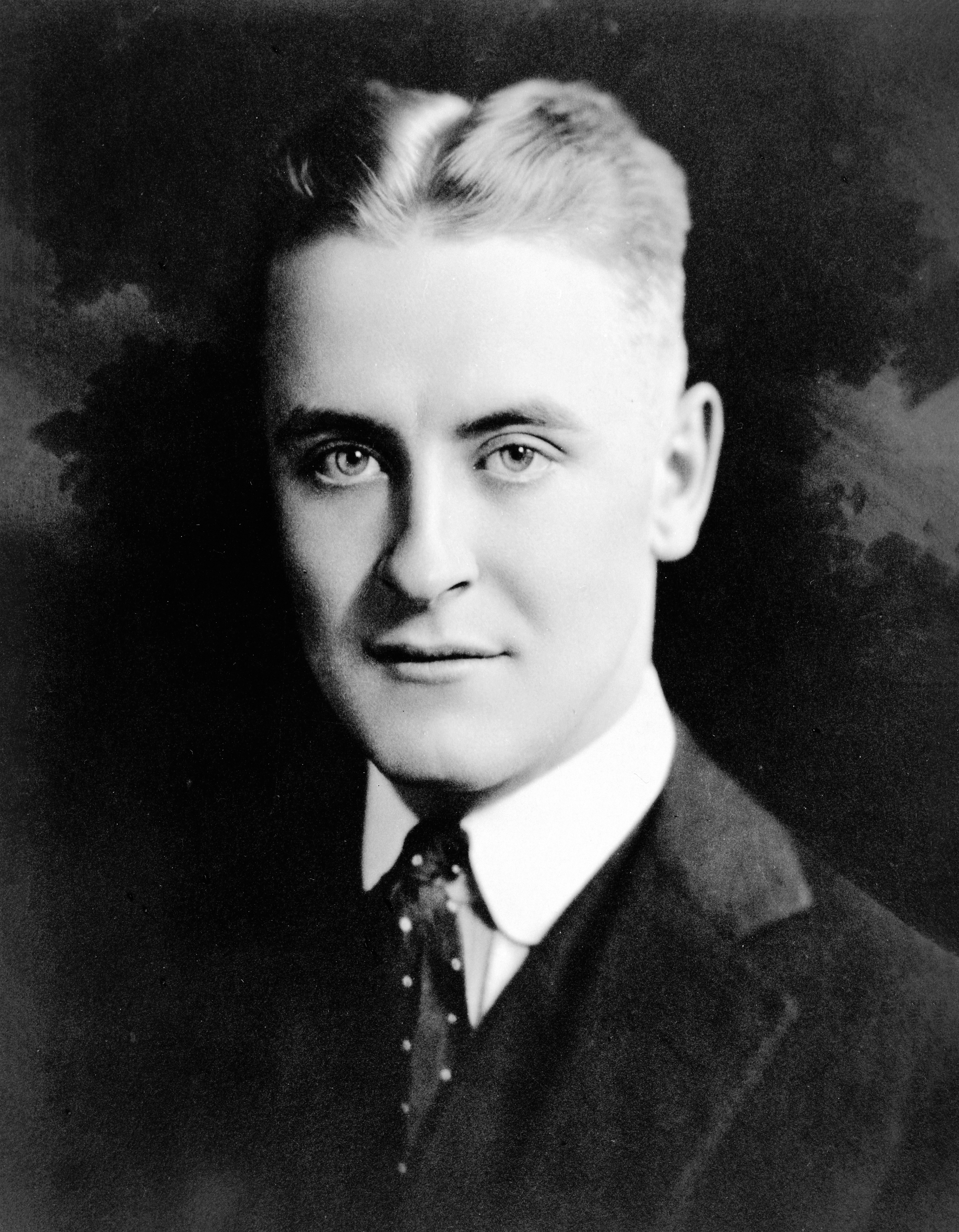
Maxwell Perkins suggested that F. Scott Fitzgerald write a retrospective essay on the Twenties.

Following the unexpected success of his debut novel This Side of Paradise (1920), a 23-year-old F. Scott Fitzgerald became one of the most celebrated novelists of the Jazz Age. Living in luxury at the opulent Biltmore Hotel in New York City, many famous persons sought his personal acquaintanceship, and he became close friends with the cultural elites of the period.

At the peak of his commercial success and cultural salience, Fitzgerald recalled traveling in a taxi one afternoon through the streets of New York City and weeping when he realized that he would never be as happy again. During this period, the zeitgeist of the Jazz Age "bore him up, flattered him and gave him more money than he had dreamed of, simply for telling people that he felt as they did, that something had to be done with all the nervous energy stored up and unexpended in the war."

With the onset of Great Depression in 1929, Fitzgerald experienced a dramatic reversal of fortune. Once favorable critics now deemed his literary output to be elitist and out-of-touch. As writer Budd Schulberg recalled, "my generation thought of F. Scott Fitzgerald as an age rather than a writer, and when the economic stroke of 1929 began to change the sheiks (Note: A "sheik" referred to young men in the Jazz Age who imitated the appearance and dress of iconic film star Rudolph Valentino. The female equivalent of a "sheik" was called a "sheba". Both "sheiks" and "shebas" were older in age than the younger "flapper" generation who were children during World War I.) and flappers into unemployed boys or underpaid girls, we consciously and a little belligerently turned our backs on Fitzgerald".

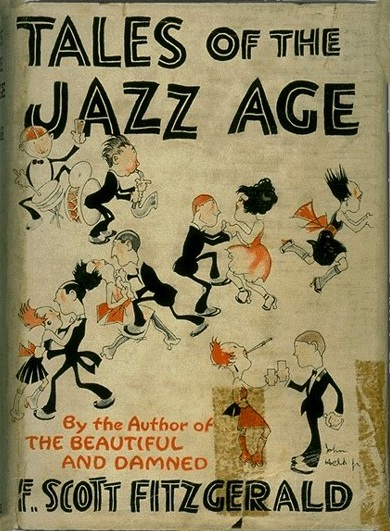
Fitzgerald's 1922 anthology, Tales of the Jazz Age, indelibly linked Fitzgerald with the era in the public's mind.

With his book royalties declining precipitously and his short stories no longer selling as easily to slick magazines such as The Saturday Evening Post and Esquire amid the economic downturn, Fitzgerald became keenly aware that one historical era had ended and another begun. "The Jazz Age is over," Fitzgerald wrote to his editor and friend Max Perkins in May 1931 while abroad in Europe.

Perkins knew that Fitzgerald had popularized the phrase "Jazz Age" via the publication of his 1922 story anthology Tales of the Jazz Age, and he believed Fitzgerald's insights about the now bygone era worthy of more consideration. Perkins suggested that Fitzgerald should write at least one article reflecting upon and eulogizing the era—some kind of "an elegy that would remind the public of his previous cultural influence as a writer and simultaneously fix a point in his mind from which he could begin a new phase of [literary] career".

At the request of Perkins, managing editor Alfred "Fritz" Dashiell of Scribner's Magazine wrote Fitzgerald and pressed him to contribute the retrospective about the bygone era. "There is no one more qualified to sound its knell," Dashiell declared. Fitzgerald could not initially commit himself to the assignment, but he could not put it out of his mind.

After further pressure by Perkins to jot down a short essay that would serve as a retrospective of both the preceding era and his own life as the era's most famous chronicler, Fitzgerald drafted the essay while in Switzerland and while his wife Zelda Fitzgerald underwent voluntary psychiatric treatment in a nearby sanatorium.

As he had already spoken at length about the so-called Jazz Age in numerous newspaper interviews throughout the 1920s, Fitzgerald's final essay recycled many of these same opinions which he had expressed nearly a decade earlier.

== Content and themes ==
The ten-year period that, as if reluctant to die outmoded in its bed, leaped to a spectacular death in October 1929, began about the time of the May Day riots in 1919.

— F. Scott Fitzgerald, "Echoes of the Jazz Age"

Fitzgerald opens the essay by positing that the historical era known as Jazz Age began in the spring of 1919. In contrast to social conservatives and isolationist politicians who insisted that World War I spawned the Jazz Age, Fitzgerald instead pinpoints the 1919 May Day Riots as the actual starting point when young Americans read newspaper accounts of how mounted police officers brutally suppressed peaceful veterans. The excessive use of force by police officers against the demobilized war veterans triggered a wave of cynicism among younger Americans, and they questioned whether their country was any better than the despotic regimes in southern Europe. Due to this resulting cynicism proliferating among American youth, "it was characteristic of the Jazz Age that it had no interest in politics at all."

Although Fitzgerald pinpoints the Jazz Age as beginning in Spring 1919, he asserts that the societal transformations which occurred had their roots as far back as 1915 before the country had formally entered World War I. During this earlier period, the avant-garde sexual theories espoused by psychoanalysts Sigmund Freud and Carl Jung became vogue among the younger generation of Americans. The result was that American women wondered whether or not they had a fulfilling sex life and pursued remedies accordingly. Simultaneously, many parents purchased automobiles for young American men in an attempt to make them "self-reliant." Amorous couples used the privacy of these new automobiles to engage in kissing and petting. Soon after, the automobiles began to be used by unchaperoned couples for the express purpose of premarital sex. At this point, Fitzgerald contends, "the veil finally fell—the Jazz Age was in flower."

Scarcely had the staider citizens of the republic caught their breaths when the wildest of all generations, the generation which had been adolescent during the confusion of the War, brusquely shouldered my contemporaries out of the way and danced into the limelight. This was the generation whose girls dramatized themselves as flappers...

— F. Scott Fitzgerald, "Echoes of the Jazz Age"

Due to the above confluence of technological innovations and cultural trends, Fitzgerald argues that Prohibition in the United States had no effect whatsoever on the libertinism of the Jazz Age and claims the rampant hedonism would have occurred regardless. Rejecting yet another popular argument, Fitzgerald insists that 1920s cinema had little influence on the creation of the Jazz Age. Fitzgerald mentions Clara Bow's films and Colleen Moore's now lost film Flaming Youth (1923) as the only films worthy of note, but he cautions that the ingravescent film censorship prevented contemporary motion pictures from accurately reflecting the libertine values of the era which had been already salient in popular novels.

Echoing Voltaire's belief that books have a dominant influence on social behavior, Fitzgerald ascribes the blithe spirit of the Jazz Age to the literary works of the period. Novels such as E. M. Hull's The Sheik (1919), Sherwood Anderson's Winesburg, Ohio (1919), Samuel Hopkins Adams's Flaming Youth (1923), D. H. Lawrence's Lady Chatterley's Lover (1928), and others reflected a gradual realization by society that neither premarital sex nor extramarital sex is harmful. Fitzgerald also implies a greater acceptance of homosexual relations in literature with the publication of Radclyffe Hall's novel The Well of Loneliness (1928).

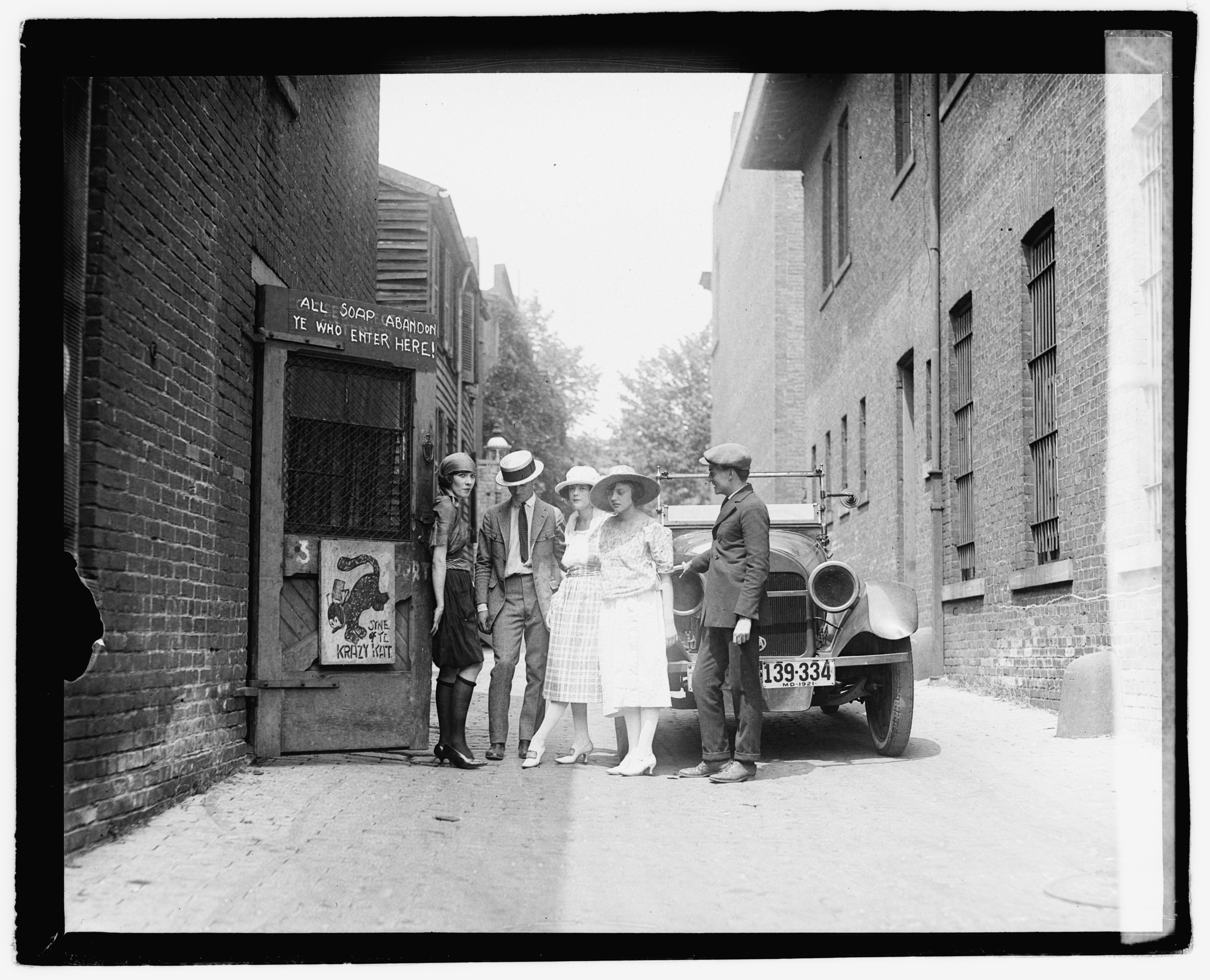
Flappers and patrons in front of The Krazy Kat, one of the famous speakeasies during the Jazz Age.

Fitzgerald notes that the younger American generation which defined the Jazz Age was not the Lost Generation—to which Gertrude Stein posited that he and Ernest Hemingway belonged—but their precocious younger peers who had been adolescent during World War I. This younger generation, whose bob-haired women would later be described by newspapers as "flappers," (Note: Flappers were young, modern women who bobbed their hair and wore short skirts. They drank alcohol and had premarital sex.) became the actual luminaries of the era, and the older Lost Generation merely imitated the wild behavior of their younger siblings.

As the riotous era known as the Jazz Age progressed, the middle-aged and elderly adults of the Gilded Age generation imitated the insouciance of the younger cohorts with the result of "a whole race going hedonistic, deciding on pleasure." Although the economic depression of 1920–1921 had initially hampered the giddiness of the period, the subsequent economic largesse which followed in the mid-1920s accelerated the frenzied hedonism, and "the Jazz Age now raced along under its own power, served by great filling stations full of money."

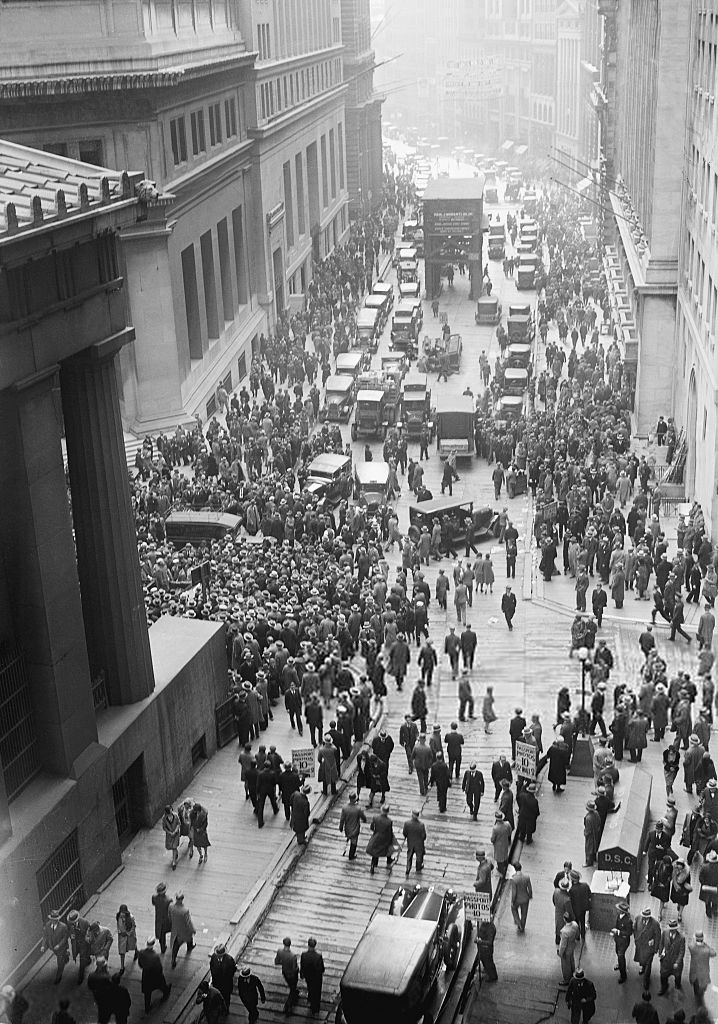
Panicked crowds on Wall Street after the 1929 crash, an event which Fitzgerald describes as the end of the Jazz Age.

With the Wall Street crash of 1929, Fitzgerald mused that "the most expensive orgy in history was [now] over." By 1931, a mere two years into the Great Depression, the carefree era known as the Jazz Age now seemed as distant to economically impoverished Americans as the antebellum period before World War I. Fitzgerald deems this outcome as inevitable since the bygone era had existed on "borrowed time anyhow—the whole upper tenth of a nation living with the insouciance of grand dukes and the casualness of chorus girls." After recognizing the inevitability of the era's abrupt end, Fitzgerald concludes the essay with a wistful coda about lost opportunities and lost youth:

"Sometimes, though, there is a ghostly rumble among the drums, an asthmatic whisper in the trombones that swings me back into the early twenties when we drank wood alcohol and every day in every way grew better and better, and there was a first abortive shortening of the skirts, and girls all looked alike in sweater dresses, and people you didn't want to know said "Yes, we have no bananas," and it seemed only a question of a few years before the older people would step aside and let the world be run by those who saw things as they were—and it all seems rosy and romantic to us who were young then, because we will never feel quite so intensely about our surroundings any more."

== Critical response ==
The publication of Fitzgerald's essay in November 1931 by Scribner's Magazine sparked critical reflection about the abrupt end of the carefree 1920s. Contemporary reception by critics proved mixed. The Minneapolis Star interpreted Fitzgerald's essay to mean "that the raucous blatancy of jazz has been supplanted by the dulcet strains of violin music, that hip-flanks are no longer toted by thrill-hunting youngsters, that the emphasis on long skirts and rounded silhouettes in women's styles has come a more measured and cultivated mode of living."

Fitzgerald biographer Arthur Mizener wrote in 1951 that the essay amounted to an extended critique by Fitzgerald of the United States during the presidencies of Warren G. Harding and Calvin Coolidge. As a social conservative, Mizener selectively highlighted passages by Fitzgerald which stated that "good instincts, honor, courtesy, and courage" as well as those "eternal necessary human values" were inadequately provided by the hedonistic Twenties. Zelda's biographer Nancy Milford posited that "Echoes of the Jazz Age" and Fitzgerald's other essay "My Lost City" represented efforts by Fitzgerald "to come to terms with the heady glamour of his past. Emotions of loss, of time and feeling unrecapturable, infused his writing."
