= Flaming Youth (novel) =

1923 novel by Samuel Hopkins Adams

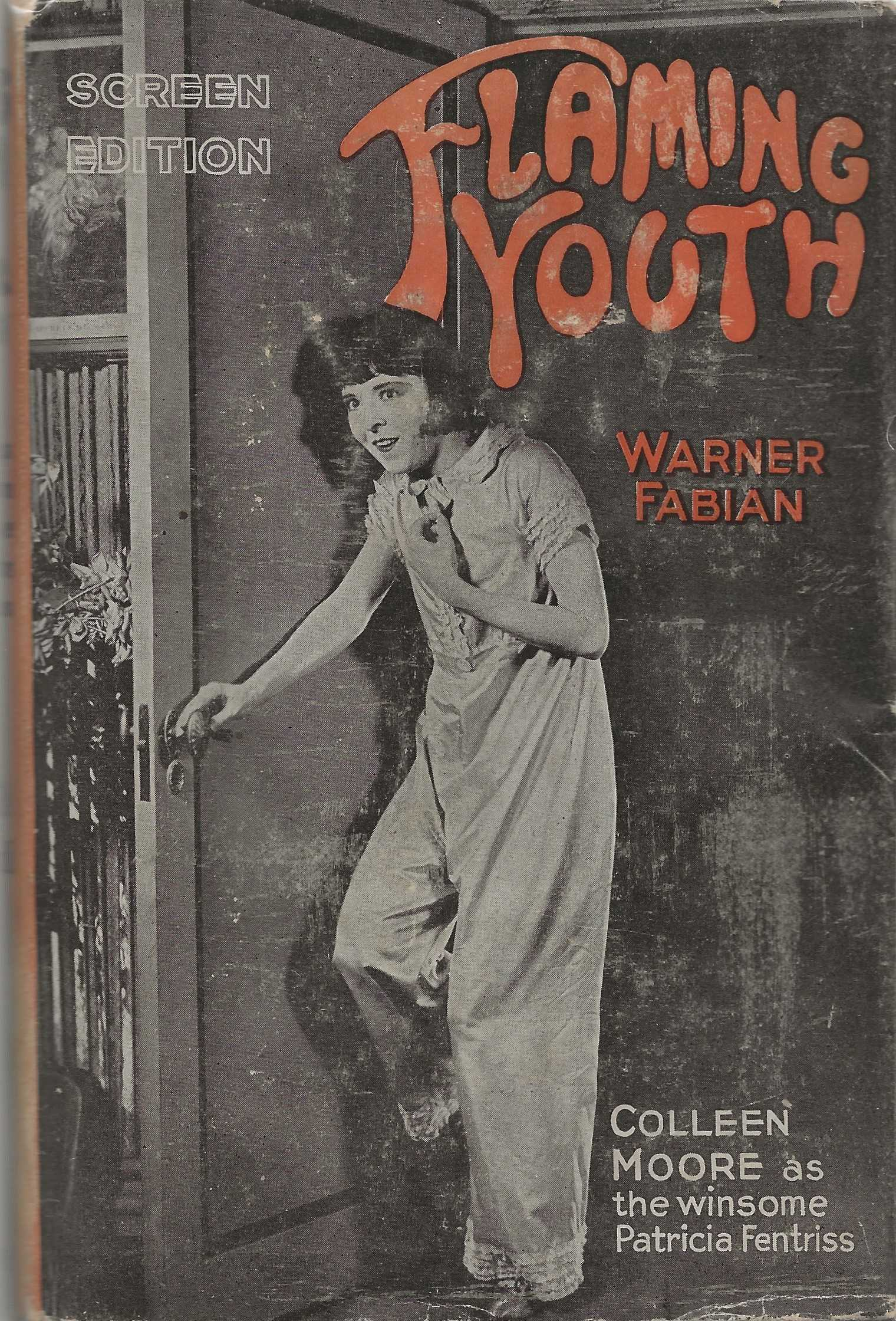
- Cover of the 1924 film tie-in edition featuring Colleen Moore and published by The Macaulay Company
- Author: Samuel Hopkins Adams
- Language: English
- Genre: Novel
- Published: 1923 (Boni & Liveright)
- Publication place: United States
- Media type: Print (hardcover & paperback)
- LC Class: PS3501.D317

Flaming Youth is a 1923 novel, considered controversial in its time, published under the pseudonym "Warner Fabian" and written by Samuel Hopkins Adams.

== Context ==
In the 1920s, Adams wrote two novels, Flaming Youth and Unforbidden Fruit, dealing with the sexual urges of young women in the Jazz Age. These novels had a sexual frankness that was surprising for their time, and Adams published them under the pseudonym "Warner Fabian" so that his other works would not be tainted by any scandal.

== Reception ==
In his retrospective essay "Echoes of the Jazz Age", writer F. Scott Fitzgerald argued that Adams' novel persuaded certain moralistic Americans that their young girls could be "seduced without being ruined" and thus altered the sexual mores of the nation. The novel was adapted into the silent movie Flaming Youth in 1923. A reviewer for the Cincinnati Enquirer noted that the film was "far from being a faithful translation of the book on which it was based" since film censorship at the time would have required the elision of some scenes which appear in the novel.

== Sources ==
- Fitzgerald, F. Scott. (1940). Echoes of the Jazz Age – via Echoes of the Jazz Age and Project Gutenberg Canada.
