= Absolute Power =

Absolute Power may refer to:

== General uses ==
- Lord Acton's dictum, "Power tends to corrupt, and absolute power corrupts absolutely"
- The power held by the sovereign of an absolute monarchy
- The power held by a leader of an autocracy or dictatorship
- Omnipotence, unlimited power, as of a deity

== Books ==
- Absolute Power (novel), a 1996 novel by David Baldacci
- Absolute Power: The Helen Clark Years, a 2008 book by Ian Wishart
- "Absolute Power", a story arc from Superman/Batman comic book series
- Absolute Power (comics), a 2024 crossover event by DC Comics

== Film and television ==
- Absolute Power (film), a 1997 film based on Baldacci's novel
- Absolute Power (radio and TV series), a BBC television and radio series
- "Absolute Power" (Stargate SG-1), a 2001 television episode
- "Absolute Power" (Superman: The Animated Series), a 1999 television episode

== Games ==
- Absolute Power (game), play-by-mail game

== Music ==
- Absolute Power (Tech N9ne album), 2002
- "Absolute Power", a 2002 song by Blitzkrieg
- Absolute Power (Pro-Pain album), 2010
- The Day the Earth Shook – The Absolute Power, a 2005 DVD by American heavy metal band Manowar

== See also ==
- Absolute square
- Absolute (disambiguation)
- Power (disambiguation)
