= Absolution (disambiguation) =

Absolution is the forgiveness experienced in traditional Christian churches in the sacrament of reconciliation (confession).

Absolution may also refer to:

== Music ==
- Absolution (album), a 2003 album by the English band Muse
- Absolution of the dead, part of the traditional Roman Catholic and Eastern Orthodox funeral liturgy
- "Absolution", a bonus song by Megadeth from the 1994 album Youthanasia
- "Absolution", a song by The Pretty Reckless from the 2014 album Going to Hell
- "Absolution", a song by Ghost from the 2015 album Meliora

== Drama ==
- Absolution (1978 film), thriller directed by Anthony Page
- Absolution (2015 film), a Romanian-American crime film directed by Keoni Waxman
- Absolution (2024 film), a 2024 American film starring Liam Neeson
- Absolution (Revenge), an episode of the American TV series Revenge
- Absolution, a 2002 play starring Brennan Brown
- Absolution (audio drama), a 2007 Big Finish Productions audio drama

== Literature ==
- "Absolution" (short story), a 1924 short story from the collection All the Sad Young Men by F. Scott Fitzgerald
- Absolution (Olafsson novel), a 1994 novel by Olaf Olafsson
- Absolution (VanderMeer novel), a 2024 novel by Jeff VanderMeer
- Absolution (comics), written and created by Christos Gage with art by Roberto Viacava

== Other uses ==
- Hitman: Absolution, a 2012 video game by IO Interactive
- Absolution (Agents of S.H.I.E.L.D.), 2016
- Absolution (professional wrestling), a stable consisting of Paige, Mandy Rose, and Sonya Deville

== See also ==
- Absolute (disambiguation)
- Absolutely (disambiguation)
- Absoluteness
- Confession (disambiguation)
- Discharge (sentence)
