= Super NES CD-ROM =

Unreleased video game platform

The Super NES CD-ROM, (Note: The system was internally known as the Super NES CD-ROM System in North America and the Super Famicom CD-ROM Adapter in Japan.) or SNES CD, was a proposed video game platform developed by Nintendo via joint ventures with Sony and Philips that would have added compact disc (CD) support for the cartridge-based Super Nintendo Entertainment System (SNES). (Note: Also known as the Super Nintendo, Super NES and SNES, and as the Super Famicom (SFC) in Japan)

The two collaborations led to two separate projects that would have used different formats based on CD-ROM; the Sony project was a dedicated all-in-one unit under the name "PlayStation" (Note: Also known as the Play Station, PlayStation SFX-100 and by fans and enthusiasts as the Nintendo PlayStation; not to be confused with the original PlayStation console released in 1994) using the Super Disc format, and the Philips project was an add-on unit for the SNES that used the Nintendo Disc (ND) format. All of these projects were cancelled shortly after Nintendo backed out of both collaborations a few years into development, which consequently made Sony develop its own console using the PlayStation name afterwards, and Philips gaining licenses for some Nintendo properties for its CD-i platform, many of which were unsuccessful and poorly received. Nintendo would not release an optical disc-based console of their own until 2001 with the GameCube.

== History ==
=== Background ===
Released in 1990, the Super Nintendo Entertainment System (SNES) was Nintendo's entry into the fourth generation of video game consoles, also known as the 16-bit era. It became a major success worldwide, outselling its competitors, the TurboGrafx-16/PC Engine and the Sega Genesis/Mega Drive, becoming the most popular console of that generation.

By the early 1990s, compact discs (CDs) had started to gain traction as a storage medium for music and video games. CDs provided an alternative to the traditional cartridge format that was the norm in the video game industry at the time, offering features such as a larger storage capacity, full-motion video (FMV) playback, and the inclusion of high-quality audio (including audio CD playback). NEC was the first to use CD technology with its TurboGrafx-CD/PC Engine CD-ROM² add-on in 1988, followed by Sega with their Sega CD/Mega-CD add-on in 1991. In response, Nintendo sought to create their own take on the concept to combat its competitors, and entered negotiations with Sony, who had previously designed the sound chips for the SNES, to create the project.

=== Conception ===
Sony engineer Ken Kutaragi became interested in video game development after observing his daughter play games on Nintendo's Famicom video game console. Without full corporate approval, Kutaragi secretly designed the S-SMP audio chip for Nintendo's upcoming Super NES console. At the time, Sony was uninterested in the video game business, so most of his superiors did not approve of the project (and he was nearly fired for doing so), but Kutaragi received support from Sony executive Norio Ohga, who allowed the project to proceed.

Encouraged by the collaboration, and convinced that CD-ROMs (which Sony had co-developed with Philips) would eventually supplant cartridges, Kutaragi proposed a CD-ROM drive for the Super NES. Although Nintendo was initially skeptical, concerned about the slow load times of CD-ROM drives of the time, it permitted Sony to begin development after Kutaragi claimed the drive would be used for multimedia purposes rather than games.

Development began in late 1988. The resulting project was a Sony-branded console called the PlayStation, designed to support both Super NES cartridges and a new CD-based format known as the Super Disc. Contemporaneous plans also reportedly called for the integration of the Super FX coprocessor developed by Argonaut Games for 3D graphics acceleration, which was used in games such as Star Fox. Jez San of Argonaut recalled that Nintendo and Sony initially wanted to add the Super FX chip into their new console, which would have allowed for rudimentary 3D graphics out of the box, and said that the chip was discussed as part of early technical proposals during negotiations with Sony and Nintendo.

Under Sony's proposed agreement, the company would retain control over the Super Disc format and its software licensing, as well as reap the exclusive benefits from music and movie content on the platform—areas where Sony was aggressively expanding. Nintendo president Hiroshi Yamauchi found the terms unacceptable. He was already wary of Sony who had demanded game developers to use its expensive, proprietary audio tools for the S-SMP audio chip. He was also concerned by Sony's growing influence across music, film, and software. Yamauchi began to suspect that Nintendo was being used to advance Sony's ambitions of launching its own console. He soon began seeking an alternative partner.

Turning to one of Sony's main rivals, Philips, Yamauchi dispatched Nintendo of America president Minoru Arakawa and executive Howard Lincoln to the Netherlands to negotiate a more favorable deal. As chronicled by David Sheff in his book Game Over, "[The Philips deal] was meant to do two things at once: give Nintendo back its stranglehold on software and gracefully f--k Sony." (Note: This is a censored quote from the original source.) Unbeknownst to Sony, Nintendo's intent to go with Philips for the CD-ROM add-on was publicly announced two days before Consumer Electronics Show in a May 1991 Seattle Times news report.

=== CES 1991 and aftermath ===
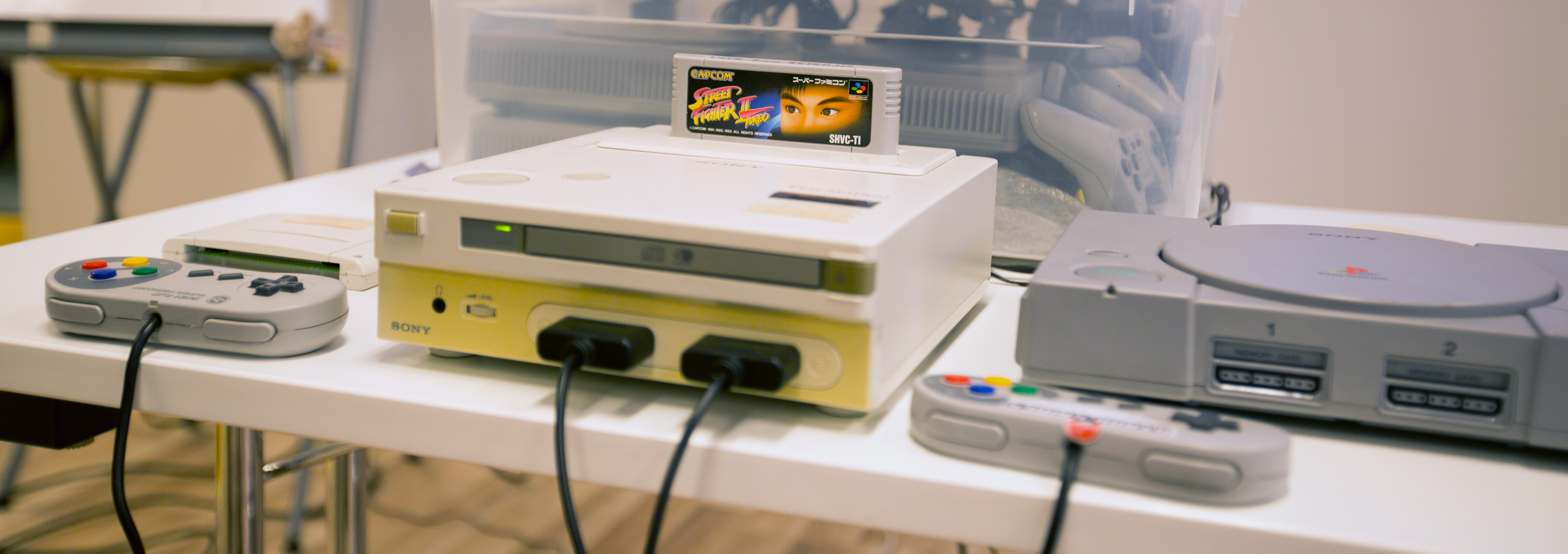
The first known SNES-based Sony PlayStation prototype with a Sony PlayStation on the right

At the Consumer Electronics Show in June 1991, Sony publicly unveiled its hybrid SNES-compatible console, the PlayStation, which supported both cartridge and CDs. The next day, Nintendo revealed its partnership with Philips at the show, which came as a surprise to the audience, and is now referred to by many journalists as "the greatest ever betrayal" in the industry.

Despite the events at CES 1991, negotiations between Nintendo and Sony continued, and during this period, two to three hundred PlayStation prototypes were produced, and software development was underway. In early 1992, the companies reached a deal allowing Sony to produce SNES-compatible hardware, while Nintendo retained control and profit over the games. However, the strained relationship between the two firms had already taken its toll. Although Sony executives still believed that partnering with the more experienced Nintendo was the safer path, Kutaragi ultimately persuaded the company to abandon the Super NES CD-ROM and instead pursue development of a standalone console for the next-generation of video games, which would become the PlayStation in 1994. This new console dropped compatibility with the SNES and contained more powerful hardware specifications than any other consoles available at the time. In order to refocus their efforts on the new console, Sony cut all ties to Nintendo in May 1992.

Meanwhile, the partnership between Nintendo and Philips led to the development of an add-on based CD-ROM peripheral for the Super NES, featuring additional hardware such as a 32-bit coprocessor and a new CD format based on CD-ROM XA technology known as the Nintendo Disc (ND). However, before any prototypes are produced, Nintendo reportedly canceled the project quietly as late as September 1993, effectively ending development of all CD-based Super NES hardware.

== Proposed devices ==
=== Sony PlayStation (SFX-100) ===
PlayStation (SFX-100)
- Recreation of a Super Disc logo used from 1991 until 1993

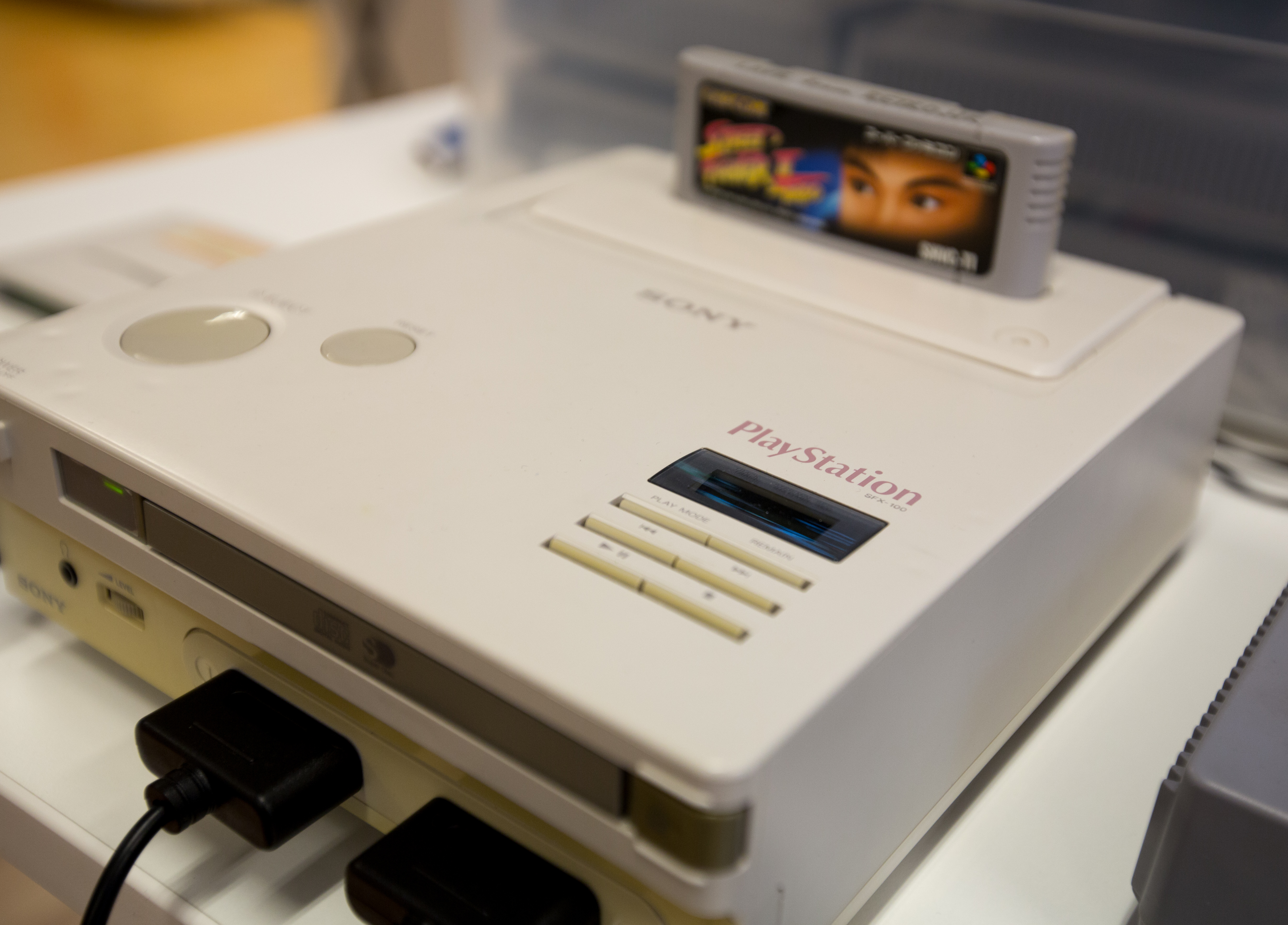
- Photo of the first known SNES-based Sony PlayStation prototype
- Also known as: Play Station; SFX-100 (model number); Nintendo PlayStation (unofficial name)
- Manufacturer: Nintendo, Sony
- Type: Video game console
- Lifespan: Canceled
- Media: Super Disc CD-ROM
- Successor: PlayStation (console)

The PlayStation (Note: Also spelled as "Play Station"; the name "Nintendo PlayStation" is a fan-coined term used by enthusiasts to primarily distinguish the console from the actual PlayStation console released in 1994/1995, despite being produced by Sony using licensed Nintendo hardware.) was a proposed standalone console co-produced by Nintendo and Sony that used its own proprietary CD-ROM format designed and solely licensed by Sony known as the Super Disc while retaining compatibility with Super NES Game Paks via an included cartridge slot.

Initial plans for the unit called for the integration of the Super FX coprocessor chip to allow for support of rudimentary 3D polygonal graphics out of the box, however this is not present in any of the prototypes that were produced.

==== Prototypes ====
At least 200-300 units of the SNES-based PlayStation prototype were produced until they were scrapped in favor of the next-generation PlayStation project, with each of the units bearing the model number SFX-100. Photos of these prototypes resurfaced in the 2000s, which were subsequently shared online as well as it being featured on an article published by Edge in April 2009 about the original PlayStation's history, showing what the unit would have looked like.

As of 2025, two known examples have been found. In July 2015, one of the original Sony PlayStation prototypes had been reportedly found; this particular unit was abandoned by former Sony Computer Entertainment CEO Ólafur Jóhann Ólafsson during his time at Advanta. A former Advanta worker, Terry Diebold, acquired the device as part of a lot during Advanta's 2009 bankruptcy auction. As shown in Benjamin Heckendorn's tear-down video of the unit in 2016, the prototype featured two Super NES controller ports, a cartridge slot, a tray-loading dual-speed CD-ROM drive, RCA composite jacks, S-Video, RFU DC OUT (similar to the PlayStation SCPH-1001), a proprietary multi-out AV output port (the same one featured on the Super NES, Nintendo 64, and GameCube), headphone jack on the front, a serial port labelled "NEXT" (probably for debugging), and one expansion port under the unit. The system was later confirmed as operational, however it was missing its original power supply as Diebold likely never received the one specific for it when he first received it in 2009, and so he had to use a third-party power supply for it in the meantime. The unit plays Super Famicom cartridges as well as its included test cartridge, although the audio output and CD drive were non-functional. It came with a Sony/PlayStation-branded version of the standard Super Famicom controller (model number SHVC-005).

Some groups have attempted to develop homebrew software for the console such as Super Boss Gaiden, as there were no known games that used the CD drive. In March 2016, retro-gaming website RetroCollect reported that it (and influential members of online emulation communities) had received (from an anonymous source) a functional disc boot ROM for the SNES-based PlayStation.

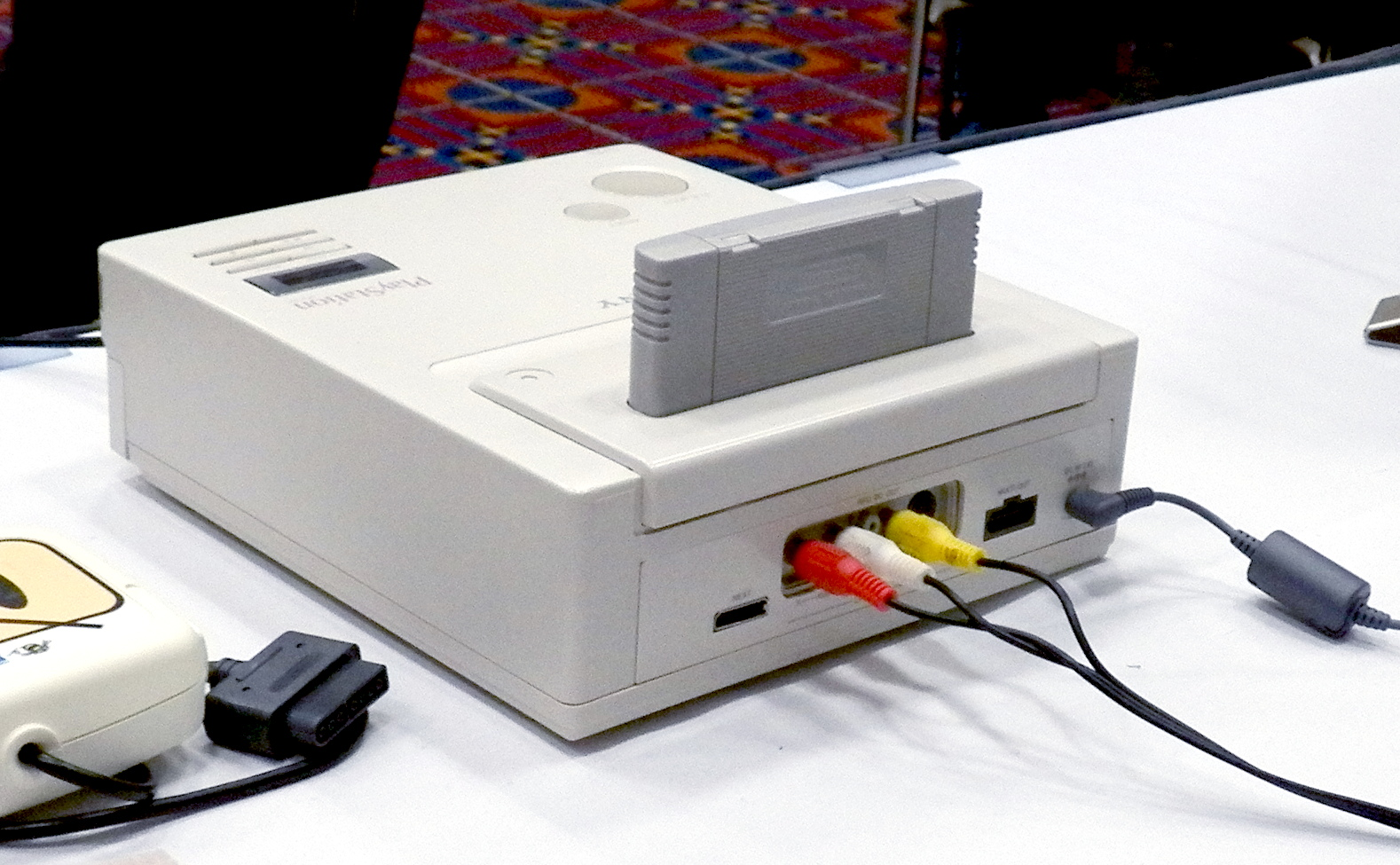
Back of the first known SNES-based Sony PlayStation prototype, showing the I/O ports and the power connector (which is non-original)

Diebold gave the unit to hardware hacker Benjamin Heckendorn in 2016 to examine its contents. In doing this, he posted a tear-down video of the system that same year, which also included some technical specifications of the prototype that he published and compared it to the other two CD-based add-ons released for the TurboGrafx-16 and Sega Genesis. He said that the system would have probably been as powerful as a standard Super NES, but not as powerful as the Sega CD. Heckendorn later identified faults in several on-board components which he subsequently replaced in 2017, resulting in fixing the audio and CD drive issues indirectly. To get around the issue of a missing power supply, Heckendorn created a custom power supply for the unit based on the original PlayStation and modified the unit to use a power connector from a Sony Walkman to match the one that was used on the custom power supply unit to ensure that it would be powered on without the need for its original power supply. Heckendorn then showed Super Famicom games (and SNES games via an adapter) working on the system and also showed audio CDs working on the system as there were no known game CDs, but affirmed that homebrew games worked.

This prototype was auctioned off to Heritage Auctions by Diebold in February 2020 with an initial price of US$15,000, but the auction quickly exceeded $350,000 within two days. It eventually sold for $360,000 to Greg McLemore, an entrepreneur and founder of Pets.com who has a large collection of other video game hardware and plans to establish a permanent museum for this type of hardware, gaining a Guinness World Record for the "most expensive videogame console sold online";

In March 2025, Kutaragi showcased one of the prototype units that he has kept inside his closet for storage, which is identical to the first known prototype unit that was discovered nearly ten years prior but in a much better physical condition.

=== Super NES CD-ROM System ===
Super NES CD-ROM System
- SNES CD add-on prototype concept art
- Also known as: Super Famicom CD-ROM Adapter
- Manufacturer: Nintendo, Philips
- Type: Video game console add-on
- Lifespan: Canceled
- Media: Nintendo Disc (CD-ROM XA)

The Super NES CD-ROM System (Note: Also known as the Super Famicom CD-ROM Adapter in Japan) was a proposed CD-ROM add-on for the Super NES co-produced by Nintendo and Philips that can accept CDs while also providing some additional hardware functionality to expand upon the capabilities of the Super NES. It was developed as a result of a partnership between the two companies that occurred alongside the ongoing development of Sony's standalone SNES-based PlayStation console and the Super Disc CD-ROM format.

Like most CD-based add-ons, it can play CD-based games as well as audio CDs via its own built-in CD drive. It was designed to be used only in conjunction with a Super NES console, and attaches to the expansion port on the bottom of the main system. Unlike most CD-ROM based add-ons (and virtually most optical disc-based game consoles since), it does not use a tray loading or top loading drive and instead uses a cartridge-based caddy loading drive that can accept discs placed in enclosed caddy cases, similar to that used in early CD-ROM drives found in contemporary computers of the time such as certain pre-1994 Macintosh computers with built-in CD drives. The caddy cases were designed to protect the discs from damage. The add-on's CD drive would operate at both single (1x) and double (2x) speeds, with the faster speed (2x) being primarily used for CD-based games while the slower speed (1x) was presumably only used for audio CDs. CD-based games for the add-on would use a new CD-ROM format known as the Nintendo Disc (ND), which was developed separately from Sony's Super Disc format and was based on CD-ROM XA; the ND format games would also be compatible with CD-i-based hardware.

Because Nintendo was convinced that using CD-ROM technology with a 16-bit processor would not provide consumers with significantly enhanced and unique games, they decided to use a new 32-bit RISC processor with the add-on, which was reported by some analysts to be an NEC V810 clocked at 21.47727 MHz. This new 32-bit CPU, known as the SCCP, was to be included inside a dedicated system cartridge that contains the extra hardware dedicated for the add-on such as additional RAM, ROM, and an additional coprocessor called "HANDS" (Hyper Advanced Nintendo Data Transfer System), a custom chip based around a single 65C02 8-bit processor clocked at 4.295 MHz. HANDS primarily acts as a decoder for the add-on's CD-ROM drive, but also enhances the SNES's sound capabilities with up to four channels of audio, complimenting with the add-on's CD audio as well as the Super NES' eight-channel S-SMP audio system. The system cartridge would be inserted into the console's cartridge slot and then interfaced via a cord that attaches from the system cartridge to the CD-ROM unit to supply power and data transfer, mirroring that of the Famicom Disk System of the preceding NES (Famicom) which uses a similar setup. Like most CD-ROM add-ons, it would also require its own power supply as the Super NES cannot supply power to the CD-ROM unit by itself; a separate AC adapter would be included with the unit to supply power to the add-on itself. To combat piracy, the add-on would have added a number of copy-protection measures to prevent the use of illicit copies and burned backups of ND format games.

The technical specifications of the Super NES CD-ROM System add-on were reported as early as 1992 by Electronic Gaming Monthly (EGM) before publishing its specs in its March 1993 issue, which were echoed in an issue of Electronic Games published in April 1993. The 1993 EGM and EG issues also showed concept art for the proposed add-on unit, with the EGM issue showing the Super Famicom design and the EG issue showing the North American Super NES design. Before a single prototype could be made, however, Nintendo quietly cancelled the project a few years into the concept phase, which was reported as late as Summer 1993.

=== Comparison ===
The following table below is based on Benjamin Heckendorn's specs comparison of the first known prototype unit of Sony's jointly produced SNES-based PlayStation console shown in July 2016. The specs of the proposed Nintendo and Philips developed Super NES CD-ROM System add-on published by Electronic Gaming Monthly and Electronic Games in 1993 are also included on this table below.

System	TurboGrafx-CD PC Engine CD-ROM²	Sega CD Mega-CD	SNES CD (SFX-100; Sony)	SNES CD (Add-on; Philips)
CPU (MHz)	7.16	7.67	3.58	3.58
Co-CPU (MHz)	—N/a	4	2.048	2.048
Bus Width (Bits)	8	16	8	8
Add-on Processor (MHz)	—N/a	12.5	—N/a	21
Add-on Video	—N/a	Present	—N/a (Note: Early plans for the SNES CD model SFX-100 called for the integration of the Super FX chip to allow for rudimentary 3D polygonal graphics out-of-the-box, however none of the available prototypes ever implemented it.)	—N/a (Note: The add-on's coprocessor is said to reproduce full-motion video and can generate calculations for 3D polygonal graphics using the coprocessor's power according to a 1992 EGM report, but the add-on has no dedicated graphics processor unlike the Sega CD.)
Add-on Audio	CD (Note: Unit also includes an Oki MSM5205 ADPCM chip alongside CD-DA)	ASIC+CD (Note: Using Ricoh RF5C164 PCM chip and CD-DA)	CD (Note: CD-DA only)	ASIC+CD (Note: Using HANDS CD-ROM decoder chip and CD-ROM XA audio)
CD-ROM Speed	1×	1×	2×	2× (Note: CD-ROM drive can operate at 1x speed for audio CDs or 2x speed for game and multimedia CDs)
Main RAM (KB)	8	64	128	128
Video RAM (KB)	64	64	64	64
Audio RAM (KB)	—N/a	8	64	64
Exp RAM (KB)	64; 256 (Note: PC Engine Duo/Super System Card/Super CD-ROM² only); 2048 (Note: Using Arcade Card add-on)	512	256	1024
Exp Video RAM (KB)	—N/a	256	—N/a	—N/a
Exp Audio RAM (KB)	64	64	—N/a	—N/a
CD Cache RAM (KB)	—N/a	16	32	1
Save data RAM (KB)	—N/a	8	8	32
Total RAM (KB)	200; 392; 2184	992	552	1313

== Legacy ==
After the original contract with Sony failed, Nintendo continued its partnership with Philips. This contract provisioned Philips with the right to feature Nintendo's characters in a few games for its CD-i multimedia device, but never resulted in a CD-ROM add-on for the Super NES after Nintendo silently cancelled the project in late 1993. The Nintendo-themed CD-i games were very poorly received, and the CD-i is considered a commercial failure. These games later found its way onto the Internet as a cult favorite; the hand-drawn cutscenes of certain Nintendo-themed CD-i games in particular were used in various parodies and internet memes in the mid-to-late 2000s, including those published on video sharing sites such as YouTube.

Shortly after Nintendo left the collaboration in 1991, Sony continued to work on the project on their own, cutting ties with Nintendo in 1992 and reworked the project into a standalone console that exclusively ran on CDs instead of cartridges and had more powerful hardware than any other consoles available at the time. It was around this time that Sony entered into a short-lived partnership with Sega under the agreement that both companies would share all costs and risk for the new CD-ROM drive (and ultimately the next generation console). Sega would cancel the partnership, however, claiming that Sony knew little of the industry at the time, and resumed development on what would eventually become the Sega Saturn. Kutaragi however became emboldened enough from his experiences working with both Nintendo and Sega, and Sony resumed development of their own console for the next generation after leaving both companies.

The main game in development for the SNES CD platform launch was Square's Secret of Mana, whose planned content was cut down to the size suitable for cartridge and released on that medium instead. While none of the hardware found in the Nintendo and Philips add-on project ever came to fruition, the CPU used in the proposed add-on, the NEC V810, did eventually make its way into at least two other video game products: NEC and Hudson Soft's PC-FX game console released exclusively in Japan in December 1994, as well as Nintendo's own Virtual Boy 3D stereoscopic game console released in July 1995 in Japan and August 1995 in North America.

Sony released the PlayStation in December 1994 in Japan and September 1995 in North America and Europe, and soon became a major success worldwide. Its next-generation CD-based console successfully competed with other CD-based consoles such as the Sega Saturn, the 3DO, and PC-FX, as well as Nintendo's cartridge-based Nintendo 64, making it a console leader. Sony had sold three times as many PlayStation consoles compared to the Nintendo 64 and the Sega Saturn in the mid-to-late 1990s, establishing Sony as a major player in the video game industry.

The broken partnership with Sony has often been cited as a mistake by Nintendo, effectively creating a formidable rival in the video game market as a consequence of Sony's and Kutaragi's shrewd determination to break into the market. Journalists have argued that if Nintendo had never broken the deal, its position may have been further undermined by Sony. Nintendo, still convinced of the faster load times and stronger anti-piracy measures of the cartridge format, did not produce an optical disc-based console until the release of the GameCube in 2001.

== See also ==
- Atari Jaguar CD
- Panasonic M2, initially announced as an add-on chip for the 3DO
- Satellaview
- Sega CD, a CD-ROM attachment for the Genesis
- TurboGrafx-16, the first video game console with a CD-ROM drive attachment
- Voicer-kun, an IR transmitter for the Super Famicom used to provide CD audio from an external CD player
- Twin Famicom, a Famicom and Famicom Disk System combination unit
- Super Famicom Naizou TV SF1, a Super Famicom and television combination that is a follow-up to the Sharp C1
