= Absolute =

Absolute may refer to:

== Mathematics and science ==
- Absolute (geometry), the quadric at infinity
- Absolute (perfumery), a fragrance substance produced by solvent extraction
- Absolute infinite or Tav (number), a number that is bigger than any other conceivable or inconceivable quantity
- Absolute magnitude, the brightness of a star
- Absolute value, a notion in mathematics, commonly a number's numerical value without regard to its sign
- Absolute pressure, the pressure in a fluid, measured relative to a vacuum
- Absolute temperature, a temperature on the thermodynamic temperature scale
- Absolute zero, the lower limit of the thermodynamic temperature scale, −273.15 °C
- Absoluteness (logic), a concept in mathematical logic

== Philosophy ==
- Absolute (philosophy), philosophical concept
  - Absolute idealism

== Politics and law ==
- Absolute defence, a factual circumstance or argument that, if proven, will end the litigation in favor of the defendant
- Absolute liability, a standard of legal liability found in tort and criminal law of various legal jurisdictions
- Absolute monarchy, a monarchical form of government in which the monarch's powers are not limited by a constitution or by the law
- Absolute majority, a majority of the membership of a group

== Media, arts and entertainment ==
- The Absolute (novel), a book in the Animorphs series
- DC Comics Absolute Edition, a line of high-end comic book reprints
- Absolute Universe, a DC comic book imprint set in a new universe
- The Absolute, the primary antagonist of Baldur's Gate 3

=== Music ===
- Absolute (production team), a British music writing and production team
- Absolute (record compilation), a brand of compilation albums from EVA Records
- Absolute (Time-Life album), an R&B compilation, 2003
- The Absolute (album), by Ace Augustine, 2011
- Absolute, an album by Aion, 1994
- Absolute, an album by Kublai Khan, 2019
- Absolute, an album by the Scientists, 1991
- "Absolute" (song), by Scritti Politti, 1985
- "Absolute", a song by the Fray from The Fray, 2009

== Organizations and companies ==
- Absolute Entertainment, a video game publisher
- Absolute F.C., an Indonesian association football club
- Absolute Radio, (formerly Virgin Radio), independent national radio station in the UK
- Absolute Security, specializes in security and data risk management
- Absolut Vodka, a brand of Swedish vodka
- Absolute Press, an imprint of Bloomsbury Publishing

== Other uses ==
- Absolute construction, a grammatical construction used in certain languages
- Absolute Manage, a systems lifecycle management software suite

== See also ==
- Absolutely (disambiguation)
- Absolution (disambiguation)
- Absolutism (disambiguation)
