= Genesis (Diaura album) =

Studio album by Diaura
- Released: March 21, 2012
- Genres: pop-rock; alternative metal; heavy metal
- Length: 45:15
- Language: Japanese
- Label: Ains/Galaxy

Diaura chronology
Dictator (2011)	Genesis (2012)	Reborn (2013)

Singles from Genesis
- 1. "Imperial”CORE”" Released: November 14, 2011

Genesis is the debut studio album by Japanese visual kei band Diaura, released on 21 March 2012 by Ains. The song "Imperial Core" was previously released as a single on November 14, 2011. The DVD included with the album contained a music video for the song "Terrors". On December 19, 2012 a second press version of the album was released, with an additional song.

== Reception ==
Allmusic writer John D. Buchanan stated "this is one of the best debuts VK had ever seen, spectacularly fulfilling Diaura's promise and cementing their place as one of the pre-eminent bands in the scene." He praised the choruses and yo-ka's "rich tenor" voice, the band's adhering to heavy metal theatricality but keeping their music melodic and the guitar solos tasteful. As a minor criticism, he mentioned "throwaway, chugtastic verses" and the drums and the guitar sounding "flat", possibly due to low budget production.

== Track listing ==
All lyrics are written by yo-ka.

CD
No.	Title	Music	Length
1.	"a genesis of the end" (SE)	Kei	2:00
2.	"TERRORS"	Kei	4:25
3.	"Imperial Core"	Kei	3:51
4.	"Futatsu no kizuato (二つの傷跡)"	yo-ka	4:06
5.	"DEAR RULER"	yo-ka	3:52
6.	"Kinshiroku (禁示録)"	Kei	3:57
7.	"Anazagate (アナザゲイト)"	Kei	4:59
8.	"Zangetsu no akari (残月の灯)"	Kei	5:06
9.	"Lost November"	yo-ka	5:45
10.	"an Insanity" (Re-recording Ver.)	DIAURA	3:42
11.	"EVER"	Kei	3:52
12.	"Daraku to ame (堕落と雨)" (2nd press only)	yo-ka	3:09

DVD
No.	Title	Length
1.	"TERRORS" (Music Video)
