= Absolute truth =

Absolute truth could refer to:

- Absolute Truth (song), song by a Canadian rock band
- Tha Absolute Truth, album by American musician Big Tuck
- Absolute truth (Buddhism), concept in Buddhism
- Degree of truth, concept in classical logic
- Absolute and relative truth in Buddhism

== See also ==
- Universality (philosophy)
- Absolute (disambiguation)
