= Triangle (Diaura album) =

Studio album by Diaura
- Released: November 26, 2014
- Genre: rock
- Language: Japanese
- Label: Ains

Diaura chronology
Focus (2013)	Triangle (2014)	Incomplete (2015)

Singles from Triangle
- 1. "Silent Majority" Released: July 9, 2014; 2. "Horizon (ホライゾン)" Released: July 9, 2014

Triangle is the third studio album by Japanese visual kei band Diaura, released on 26 November 2014, by Ains. It debuted on Oricon's weekly chart at the 33rd place, and at the 2nd place on the Indies albums chart. Two singles were released prior to the album, in July 2014, titled "Silent Majority" and "Horizon". A third single titled "Blind Message" was also released on 3 September, however, the song was not included in the album, only its music video was featured on the DVD extra of the B type release.

== Track listing ==
The album was released in three versions: besides a normal CD version, the A type included a DVD extra with concert footage, while the B type DVD included two music videos.

All lyrics are written by yo-ka

Normal CD
No.	Title	Music	Length
1.	"Triangle Vision (SE)"	Kei	1:45
2.	"ID"	Kei	4:11
3.	"Menace"	Kei	3:45
4.	"Moratorium (モラトリアム)"	Kei	4:15
5.	"Shin sekai (新世界)"	yo-ka	3:52
6.	"Hypnosis"	Kei	4:26
7.	"Case of Massmurder"	yo-ka	4:34
8.	"Silent Majority"	yo-ka	3:40
9.	"Aria (アリア)"	yo-ka	3:38
10.	"Kairi (解離)"	Kei	5:11
11.	"Horizon (ホライゾン)"	Kei	4:46
12.	"Jikai (自壊)"	Kei	5:27

A type, DVD extra
No.	Title	Length
1.	"Ains Presents Diaura 47 Todōfuken tandoku kōen Tour '2014 "Into the 'deep' Core～Awakening Menace～" Tour Ura Final 2014nen 08-tsuki 16-nichi (tsuchi) Shibuya Quattro (Ains Presents Diaura 47都道府県単独公演Tour'2014 「Into the【deep】Core～Awakening Menace～」Tour 裏Final 2014年08月16日(土)渋谷Quattro)"

B type, DVD extra
No.	Title	Length
1.	"Moratorium (モラトリアム)" (music video)
2.	"Blind Message" (music video)
