= Focus (Diaura album) =

Studio album by Diaura
- Released: December 4, 2013
- Genre: rock
- Length: 47:59
- Language: Japanese
- Label: blowgrow

Diaura chronology
Reborn (2012)	Focus (2013)	Triangle (2014)

Singles from Focus
- 1. "SIRIUS/Lily" Released: July 10, 2013

Focus is the second studio album by Japanese visual kei band Diaura, released on 4 December 2013, by blowgrow. It debuted on Oricon's weekly chart at the 49th place. This is the band's first full album with Tatsuya on the drums. The DVD included with the album contained the music video for the song "Trigger". The song titled "Sirius" was previously released as a single on July 10, 2013.

== Track listing ==
All lyrics are written by yo-ka

CD
No.	Title	Music	Length
1.	"Code0"	Kei	4:02
2.	"Sajō no yume (砂上の夢)"	Kei	3:51
3.	"Taboo"	Kei	4:20
4.	"Sirius (Focus Mix)"	Kei	4:54
5.	"Akai kyozō (赤い虚像)"	yo-ka	3:34
6.	"Sleeping Beauty"	yo-ka	3:54
7.	"Invisible"	Kei	4:44
8.	"Lost rain ~ ushinai no ame, sono kioku to no kyōsei ~ (Lost rain ~失いの雨、その記憶との共生~)"	Kei	6:24
9.	"The Redemption"	Tatsuya	4:48
10.	"Innocent (イノセント)"	yo-ka	3:48
11.	"Trigger"	Kei	3:40

DVD
No.	Title	Length
1.	"Trigger" (Music Video)	4:40
