= Definiteness (disambiguation) =

Definiteness is a feature of noun phrases in grammatical theory.

Definiteness may also refer to:

- Counterfactual definiteness, a concept in quantum mechanics
- For the definiteness of forms in multilinear algebra, see Definite quadratic form.

== See also ==
- Definition (disambiguation)
- Definitive (disambiguation)
- Absolutely (disambiguation)
