= My Resistance =

EP by Diaura
- Released: November 16, 2016
- Genre: rock
- Language: Japanese
- Label: Ains

Diaura chronology
Incomplete (2015)	My Resistance (2016)	Versus (2017)

My Resistance is the third EP album by Japanese visual kei band Diaura, released on 16 December, 2016, by Ains. It was 27th on the Oricon weekly chart, and third on the Indies chart. It was released in two versions: the last song on A type is "Criminal Beast", while it is "Daybreaker" on B type. A type also includes a DVD with the music video of "Tōsaku-shō Resistance (倒錯症レジスタンス)" and the making-of footage of the MV. The band appeared live on Niconico on 19 November to promote the release of the album.

== Track listing ==
All lyrics are written by yo-ka

A type
No.	Title	Music	Length
1.	"SE: My Resistance"	Kei	1:56
2.	"Shiro to aoi no kyōkai (白と蒼の境界)"	Kei	3:49
3.	"The abyss"	Kei	3:25
4.	"Tōsaku-shō Resistance (倒錯症レジスタンス)"	Kei	3:20
5.	"Linkage"	Kei	3:34
6.	"Mr. Isolation"	yo-ka	3:18
7.	"Criminal Beast"	Kei	3:54

DVD
No.	Title	Length
1.	"Tōsaku-shō Resistance (倒錯症レジスタンス)" (videoklip)
2.	"Making eizō (メイキング映像)"

B type
No.	Title	Music	Length
7.	"Daybreaker"	Tatsuya	3:50
Total length:			23:12
