= Incomplete =

Incomplete may refer to:

- Unfinished creative work
- An incomplete formal system, see Completeness (logic)
- Gödel's incompleteness theorems, a specification of logic
- "Incomplete" (Bad Religion song), 1994
- "Incomplete" (Sisqó song), 1999
- "Incomplete" (Backstreet Boys song), 2005
- "Incomplete" (Hoobastank song), 2013
- Incomplete (Nembrionic album), or the title track
- Incomplete (Diaura album), 2015
- Incomplete pass, a gridiron football term
- Incomplete abortion (or incomplete miscarriage), a medical term
- "Incomplete", a song by Alanis Morissette on the 2008 album Flavors of Entanglement
- "Incomplete", a song by Coldrain on the 2025 EP Optimize
- “Incomplete”, an episode of The Good Doctor

== See also ==
- Completeness (disambiguation)
