= Definitive =

Definitive may refer to:

- Definitive (TV series), an American music television series
- Definitive stamp, a postage stamp that is part of a regular issue of a country's stamps available for sale by the postal service

== See also ==
- Definiteness (disambiguation)
- Definition (disambiguation)
