= Versus (Diaura album) =

Studio album by Diaura
- Released: November 29, 2017
- Genre: Alternative metal; alternative rock; post-grunge; metalcore
- Length: 54:53 (limited edition)
- Language: Japanese
- Label: Ains

Diaura chronology
My Resistance (2016)	Versus (2017)	Definition (2019)

Singles from Versus
- 1. "Noah/Shangri-La (シャングリラ)" Released: July 10, 2014

Versus is the fourth studio album by Japanese visual kei band Diaura, released on 29 November 2017, by Ains. It debuted on Oricon's weekly chart at the 30th place, and was 2nd on the Indies chart. On July 10, 2014 a single titled "Noah/Shangri-La (シャングリラ)" was released off the album.

== Track listing ==
All lyrics are written by yo-ka

Regular edition
No.	Title	Music	Length
1.	"Beyond the Death Wall (SE)"	Kei	1:27
2.	"Shinshoku (侵蝕)"	Kei	3:17
3.	"Suna no tō: Tower of Imitation (砂の塔-Tower of Imitation-)"	Kei	3:42
4.	"Rosary (ロザリー)"	Kei	3:26
5.	"Shangri-La (シャングリラ)"	Kei	3:51
6.	"REM"	yo-ka	3:13
7.	"Tōi haru (遠い春)"	Kei	4:14
8.	"「 」phobia"	yo-ka	3:52
9.	"Icarus no yume (イカロスの夢)"	Kei	3:16
10.	"Noah"	yo-ka	4:37
11.	"Ares or Thanatos"	Tatsuya	3:44
12.	"Dancing in the Dark (ダンシンインザダーク)"	Kei	3:51
13.	"is DEAD"	yo-ka	4:03
14.	"Idea: genjitsu e no kaiki (IDEA-現実への回帰-)"	yo-ka	4:35
Total length:			51:08

Limited edition
No.	Title	Music	Length
15.	"Lost Child (ロストチャイルド)" (extra song)	yo-ka	3:45

DVD (of limited edition)
No.	Title	Length
1.	"Suna no tō: Tower of Imitation (砂の塔-Tower of Imitation-)" (Music video)
