= Dictator (Diaura album) =

EP by Diaura
- Released: August 10, 2011
- Genre: rock
- Language: Japanese
- Label: Ains/Galaxy

Diaura chronology
Dictator (2011)	Genesis (2012)

Dictator is the first EP by Japanese visual kei band Diaura, released on 10 August 2011 by Galaxy. It reached 195th place on the Oricon weekly chart, all of the 1,000 copies of the first press were sold out. It was re-released by Ains on 19 December 2012, with one extra song included.

== Track listing ==
All lyrics are written by yo-ka

A type CD
No.	Title	Music	Length
1.	"Fuka (深) (SE)"	Kei
2.	"Naraku no hana (奈落の花)"	yo-ka
3.	"Dictator"	Kei
4.	"Master"	yo-ka
5.	"Infinite (インフィネイト)"	Kei
6.	"Sister" (only in second press)	yo-ka

A type, DVD
No.	Title	Music	Length
1.	"Shitsu tsubasa no ryōiki (失翼の領域)" (music video)	Kei

B type CD
No.	Title	Music	Length
1.	"World End (SE)"
2.	"Naraku no hana (奈落の花)"	yo-ka
3.	"Dictator"	Kei
4.	"Master"	yo-ka
5.	"Infinite (インフィネイト)"	Kei

B type, DVD
No.	Title	Length
1.	"Documentary eizō (ドキュメンタリー映像)" (dokumentary film)
