= The Definition =

The Definition may refer to:

- The Definition (song), a 2008 song by Brandy
- The Definition (album), a 2011 album by Layzie Bone
- The DEFinition, a 2004 album by LL Cool J

== See also ==
- The Definition Of..., a 2016 album by Fantasia
- Definition (disambiguation)
