= Reborn (Diaura album) =

EP by Diaura
- Released: March 13, 2013
- Genre: rock music
- Length: 24:29 (C type)
- Language: Japanese
- Label: Ains

Diaura chronology
Genesis (2012)	Reborn (2013)	Focus (2013)

Reborn is the second minialbum by Japanese visual kei band Diaura, released on 13 March, 2013 by Ains. It was released in three versions: the DVD included in the A type contains the music video of the song "Taidō (胎動)", while the B type DVD includes concert footage. The C type record has an additional song. The album was 68th on the Oricon weekly chart, while it charted 4th on the Indies chart.

The album was officially released with three members of the band, as it was produced after the departure of drummer Yuu. Current drummer Tatsuya was a support musician in this record.

== Track listing ==
All lyrics are written by yo-ka

A type, CD
No.	Title	Music	Length
1.	"Taidō (胎動)"	yo-ka	2:41
2.	"Reborn"	Kei	4:13
3.	"anti people"	yo-ka	3:15
4.	"Kindan ryōiki (禁断領域)"	Kei	4:16
5.	"Garden of Eden"	Kei	5:23
Total length:			19:48

A type, DVD
No.	Title	Length
1.	"Taidō (胎動)" (music video)

B type, DVD
No.	Title	Length
1.	"2012/12/2 [deadly"9"circuit] at Shibuya REX (2012/12/2 [deadly"9"circuit] at 渋谷REX)" (concert footage)

C type, CD
No.	Title	Music	Length
6.	"Virgin Mary" (re-recording)	Kei	4:41
Total length:			24:29
