= Valentines (short story collection) =

Book by Olaf Olafsson

- First edition (Icelandic)
- Author: Olaf Olafsson
- Original title: Aldingarðurinn
- Language: English
- Genre: Fiction
- Publisher: Vaka-Helgafell (Iceland); Pantheon (US)
- Publication date: 2006
- Publication place: United States
- English publication date: January 30, 2007
- Media type: Print (paperback)
- Pages: 224 (paperback)
- ISBN: 0-307-28055-1

Valentines is a collection of short stories by Olaf Olafsson.

== Synopsis ==
The twelve stories in Valentines are linked by the months of the year. Each brisk story captures the most candid moments between spouses, family members, and lovers—moments when dangerous feelings surge to the surface and everything changes. A wife realizes her closest confidante is much more than that. A father tries to dress his new lover in the clothing of his late wife. A woman, watching her son and husband from afar, sees something she can never forget.

== Critical reception ==
"Olafsson is an admirably brisk, compelling narrator." - Kirkus Reviews

"...Utterly compelling…Olafsson’s Nordic realism a la Bergman holds a ghastly fascination." - Publishers Weekly

"Olafsson ... gives us cleanly written stories, eschewing sentimental for a matter-of fact presentation of the shadowy emotional burdens that always lie between the lines." - Providence Journal

== Awards ==
- 2006 Icelandic Literary Prize for Fiction
