= Pro-Pain =

American metal band

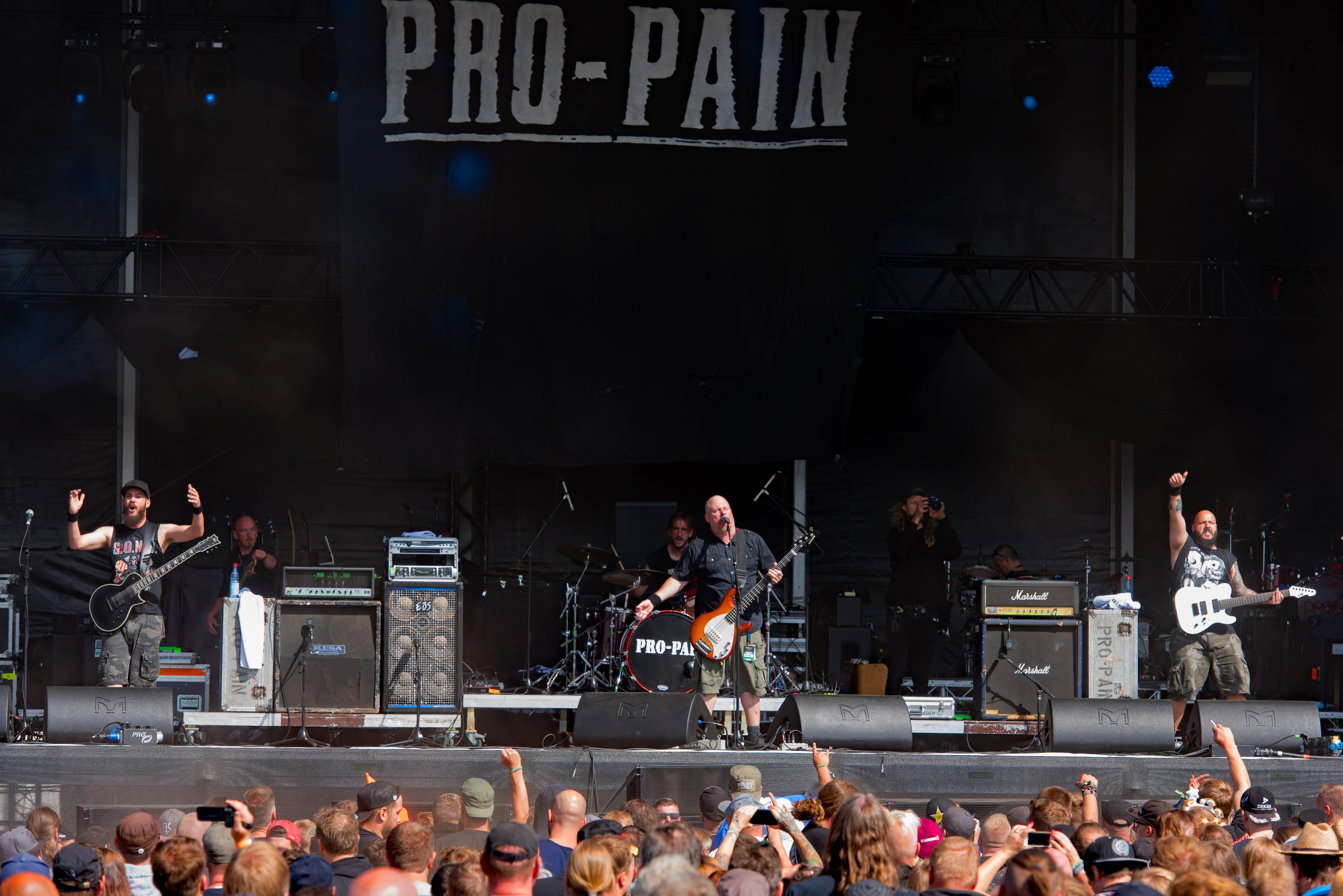
- Pro-Pain at Reload Festival 2018

Background information
- Origin: New York City, New York, U.S.
- Genres: Groove metal; thrash metal; hardcore punk; tough guy hardcore
- Years active: 1991–present
- Labels: Regain; Rawhead, Inc.
- Spinoff of: Crumbsuckers
- Members: Gary Meskil; Greg Discenza; Eric Klinger; Jonas Sanders
- Website: pro-pain.com

Pro-Pain is an American heavy metal band based in New York City, formed in 1991 by vocalist and bassist Gary Meskil and drummer Dan Richardson, both former members of Crumbsuckers.

== History ==
Their debut album Foul Taste of Freedom was released in 1992, displaying hardcore punk and rap metal influences, after which the band was signed to Roadrunner Records, who reissued the album the following year. Their second album The Truth Hurts was initially banned due to the sleeve artwork, featuring a picture of a stitched-up woman after an autopsy.

The band has released several more albums with a varying line-up over the years, with Meskil being the only constant member. The self-produced album Act of God saw the band signed to Nuclear Blast Records after they had relocated to Sarasota, Florida. The same label released Round 6 in 2000 and the live album Road Rage in 2001. In 2004, they released their first album for Candlelight Records, Fistful of Hate. Tom Klimchuck left the band in 2011 due to "unexpected circumstances regarding some potentially serious health issues." He had since been replaced by Adam Phillips of Indorphine, who stayed until 2019 when current guitarist Greg Discenza replaced him. On 3 July 2017, Gary Meskil was the victim of a robbery and attempted murder in Belgium while on tour with Pro-Pain in support of their 2015 album Voice of Rebellion. Pro-Pain remains active to this day, and the band released their first studio album in 11 years, Stone Cold Anger, in 2026.

== Band members ==
Pro-Pain live at With Full Force 2018

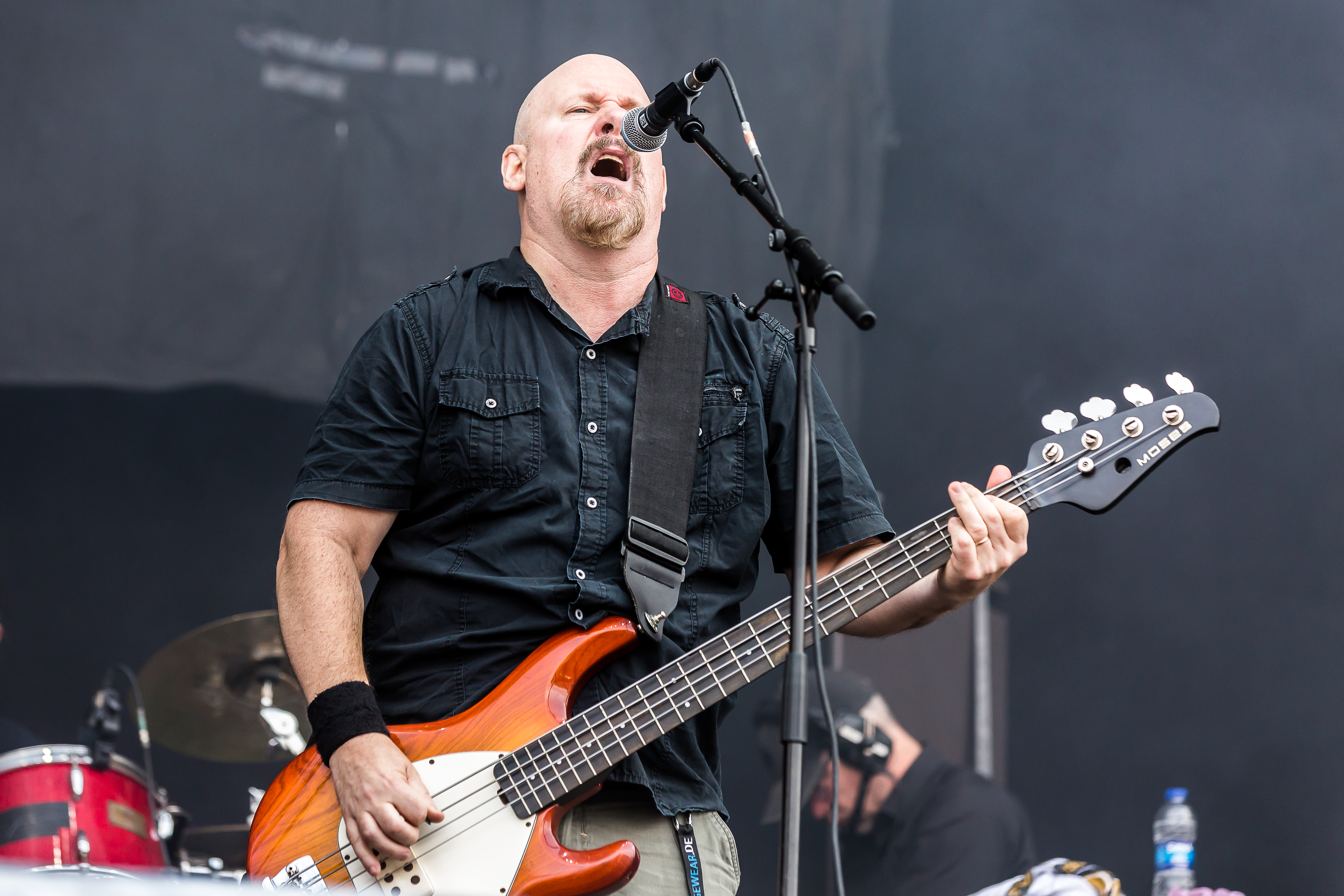
Gary Meskil

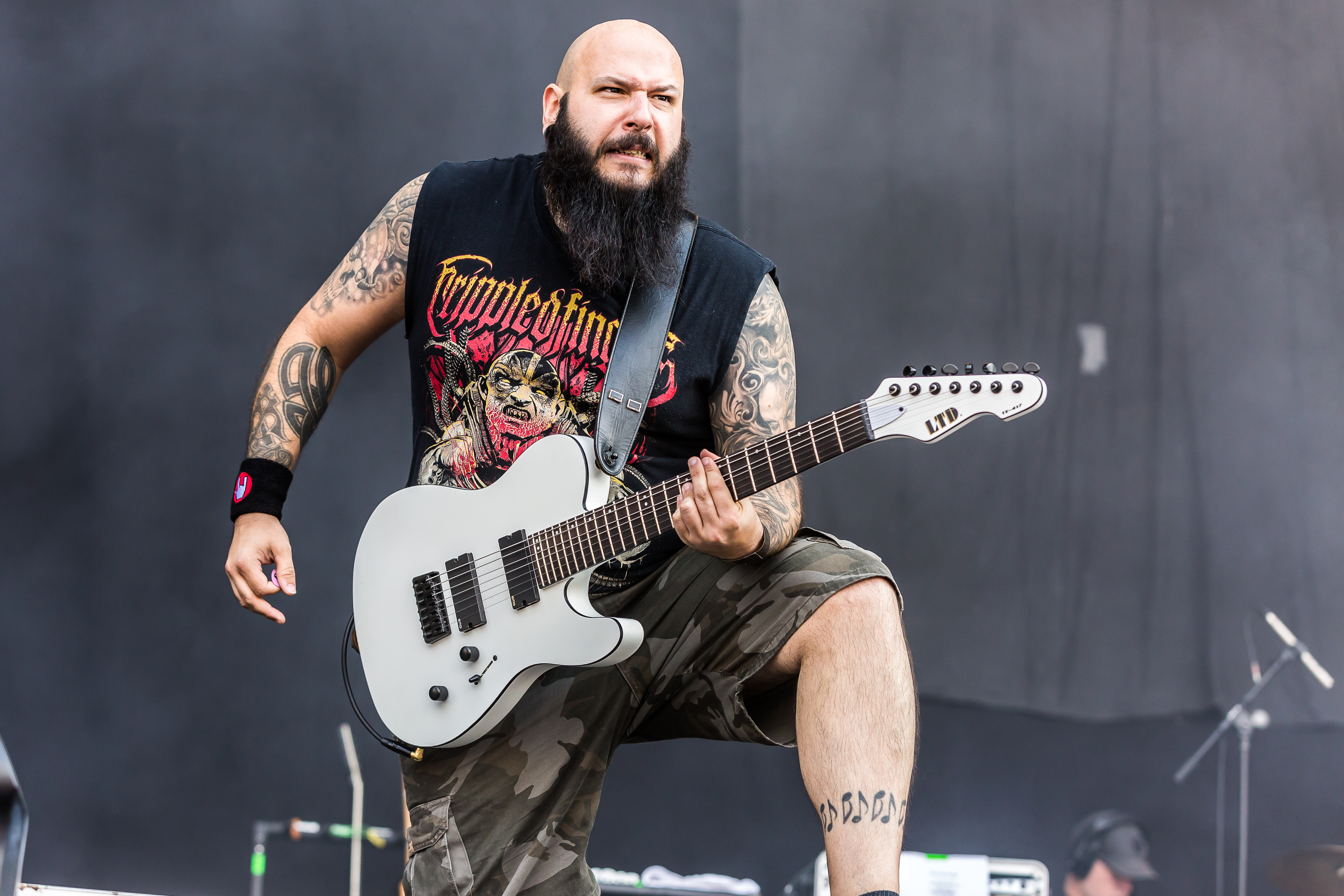
Adam Phillips

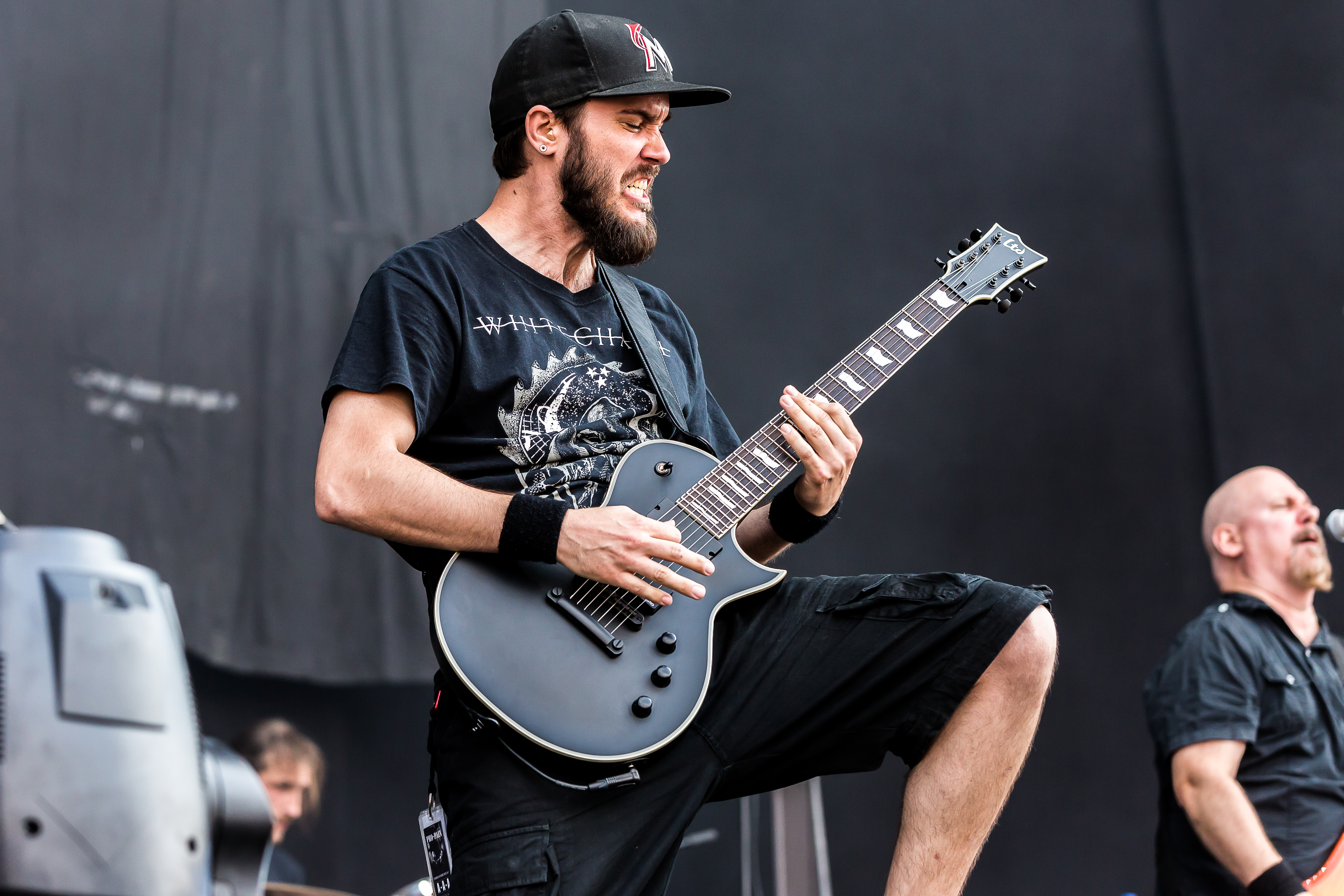
Matt Sheridan

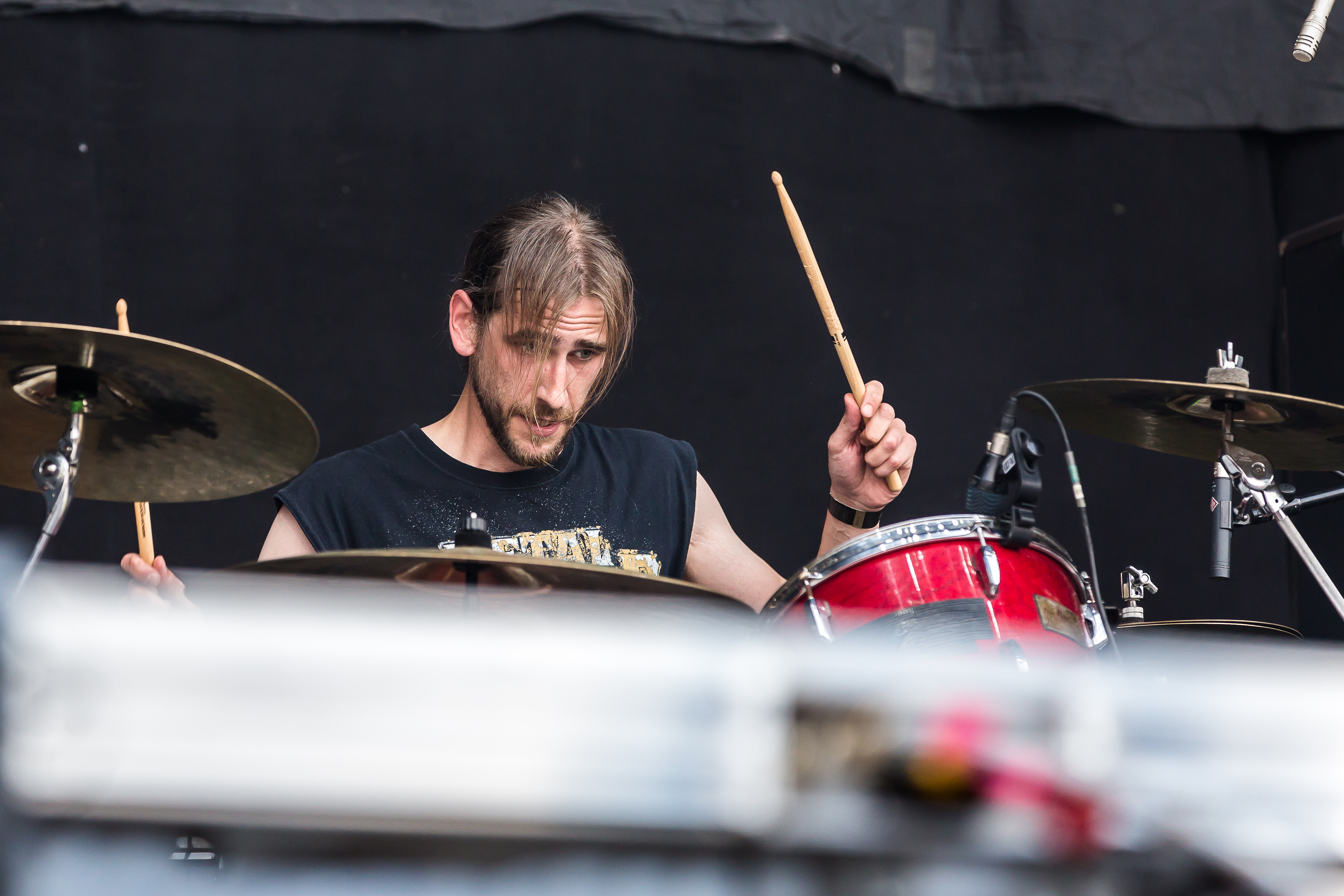
Jonas Sanders

=== Current ===
- Gary Meskil – bass, vocals (1991–present)
- Eric Klinger – rhythm guitar (1999–2007, 2024–present)
- Greg Discenza – lead guitar (2019–present)
- Jonas Sanders – drums (2012–present)

=== Former ===
- Tom Klimchuck – lead and rhythm guitar (1991–1994, 1996–2011)
- Dan Richardson – drums (1991–1997)
- Nick St. Denis – guitar (1994–1995)
- Mike Hollman – guitar (1994–1995)
- Rob Moschetti – guitar (1996–1998)
- Dave Chavarri – drums (1997–1998)
- Mike Hanzel – drums (1998)
- Eric Matthews – drums (1999–2003)
- Rich Ferjanic – drums (2003–2004)
- JC Dwyer – drums (2004–2009)
- Rick Halverson – drums (2009–2011)
- Marshall Stephens – guitar (2007–2016)
- Adam Phillips – guitar (2011–2019)
- Matt Sheridan – rhythm guitar (2016–2024)

== Discography ==
=== Studio albums ===
- Foul Taste of Freedom (1992), Energy/Roadrunner Records
- The Truth Hurts (1994), Energy/Roadrunner
- Contents Under Pressure (1996), Energy/Concrete
- Pro-Pain (1998), High Gain/Mayhem
- Act of God (1999), High Gain/Nuclear Blast Records
- Round 6 (2000), Nuclear Blast/Spitfire
- Shreds of Dignity (2002), Nuclear Blast
- Fistful of Hate (2004), Continental/Candlelight
- Prophets of Doom (2005), Continental
- Age of Tyranny – The Tenth Crusade (2007), Continental/Candlelight
- No End in Sight (2008), Continental
- Absolute Power (2010), Continental/Regain
- Straight to the Dome (2012), Sunny Bastards/Nuclear Blast
- The Final Revolution (2013), SPV Steamhammer
- Voice of Rebellion (2015), SPV Steamhammer
- Stone Cold Anger (2026), Napalm Records

=== Live albums ===
- Road Rage (2001), Nuclear Blast/Spitfire

=== Compilation albums ===
- Best of Pro-Pain (1998), High-Gain/Mayhem
- Best of Pro-Pain II (2005), Candlelight
- 20 Years of Hardcore (2011), AFM

=== Tribute albums ===
- Run for Cover (2003), Spitfire

=== DVD ===
- Raw Video (2001 (EU) / 2004 (US)), Nuclear Blast/Candlelight
