= Ólafur Jóhann Ólafsson =

Icelandic businessman and writer

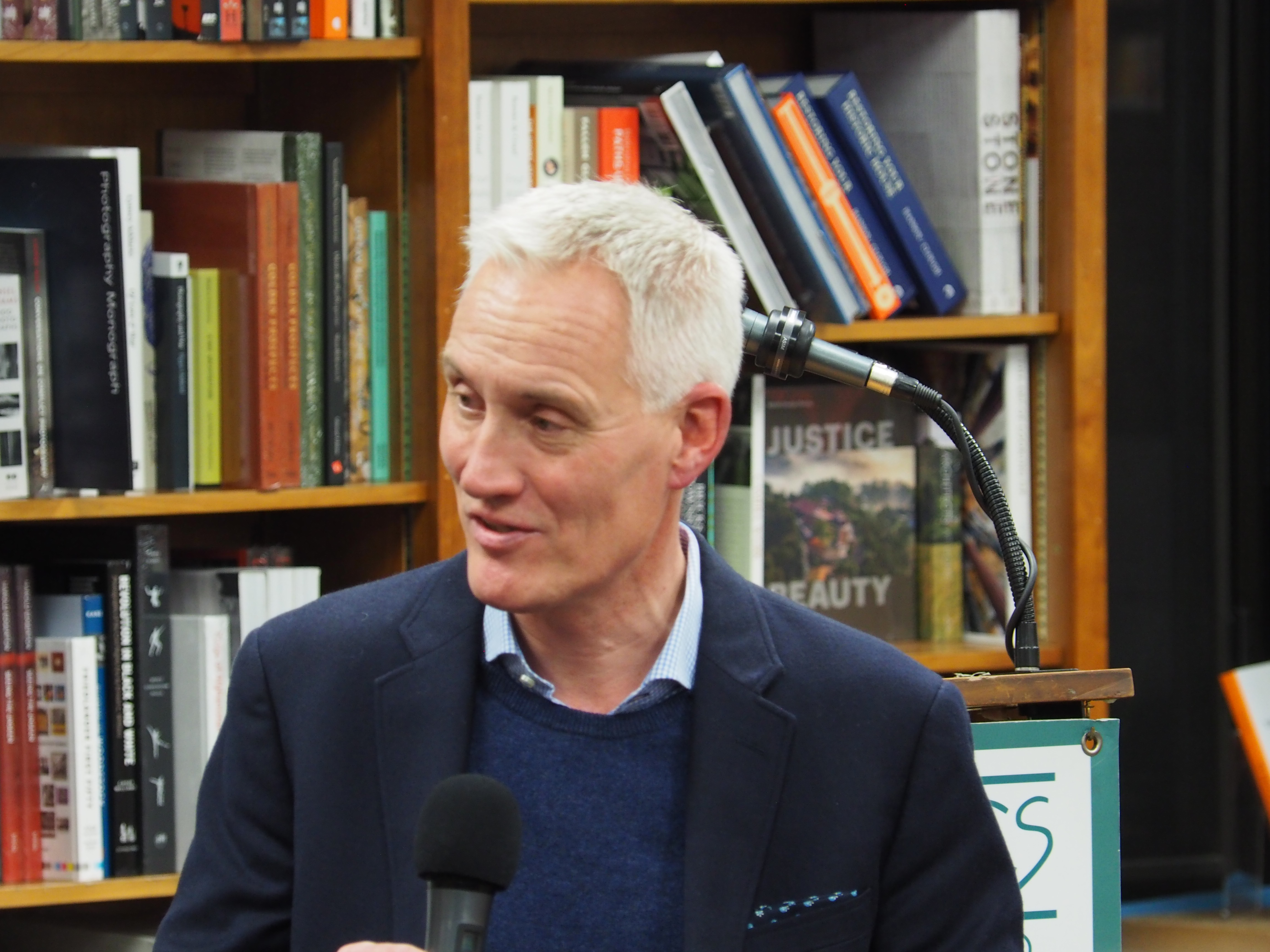
- Born: 26 September 1962 (age 64); Reykjavík, Iceland
- Other name: Olaf Olafsson
- Education: Brandeis University
- Occupations: Businessman and writer
- Spouse: Anna Ólafsdóttir
- Children: 3

Ólafur Jóhann Ólafsson (born 26 September 1962), also known as Olaf Olafsson, is an Icelandic businessman and writer. He is best known for his tenure at Sony and his leadership in the creation of the PlayStation video game console.

== Personal life ==
Ólafur was born in Reykjavík, Iceland on 26 September 1962 to Anna Jónsdóttir and writer Ólafur Jóhann Sigurðsson. He studied physics as a Wien Scholar at Brandeis University. He lives in New York City with his wife Anna Ólafsdóttir and three children.

== Literary career ==
He is the author of many novels, several of which have also appeared in English, including The Journey Home, Absolution, Walking into the Night, and Touch, as well as a story collection, Valentines. He also wrote the plays The Feast of the Snails and Apartment 10B, albeit to mixed reviews. His books have been published to critical acclaim in more than twenty languages. Ólafur is the recipient of the O. Henry Award and the Icelandic Literary Prize, was shortlisted for the Frank O'Connor International Short Story Award, and has twice been nominated for the International Dublin Literary Award. His novel Touch was made into a motion picture in 2024, directed by Baltasar Kormákur, to positive reviews.

== Business career ==
Ólafur began a career at Sony in 1985, where he rose through several positions. In 1991, he founded Sony Electronic Publishing Company (later renamed to Sony Computer Entertainment, Inc.), and became its first president and chief executive officer. Sony Computer was established as a free-functioning unit of Sony Corporation. Olafsson built and managed its businesses in the United States and Europe. During his six-year tenure, he directed the worldwide operations of Sony's entertainment software and hardware divisions and was responsible for the creation and launch of the PlayStation console, which would go onto generate major sales and profits for Sony Interactive. However, Olafsson clashed with higher-ups over the PlayStation's pricing as he favoured lower price on the console. The intense feuding caused him to lose support within the company and he was forced to resign in 1996.

Ólafur became a member of the board of directors of Advanta Corporation, a specialty finance company, in 1997, and became Advanta's president in March 1998. Olafsson left Advanta in 1999 to join Time Warner as Vice Chairman of Digital Media. He briefly left the company after its merger with AOL, which formed the short-lived AOL Time Warner. He returned at the request of CEO Richard D. Parsons after Time Warner executives reasserted control over the company. He was later given the title of Executive Vice President. With the AT&T purchase of Time Warner, Olafsson and several other Time Warner executives left the combined company.

== Books ==
- Absolution (Pantheon, 1994) ISBN 9781400030682
- The Journey Home (Pantheon, 2000). ISBN 9780571204748
- Walking into the Night (Pantheon, 2003) ISBN 9781400034802
- Valentines (Random House, 2007). ISBN 9780307280558
- Restoration (Ecco, 2012) ISBN 9780062065650
- One Station Away, (New York: Ecco, 2017) ISBN 9780062677495
- The Sacrament (HarperCollins, 2019) ISBN 9780062899873
- Touch (HarperCollins, 2022) ISBN 9780063226982
