= Definition (Diaura EP) =

EP by Diaura
- Released: February 13, 2019
- Genre: rock
- Language: Japanese
- Label: NDG

Diaura chronology
Versus (2017)	Definition (2019)

Singles from Definition
- 1. "Malice" Released: October 24, 2018

Definition is the fourth mini album by Japanese visual kei band Diaura, released on 13 February 2019, by NDG. It debuted on Oricon's weekly chart at the 43rd place, and was 6th on the Indies chart. On October 24, 2018, a single titled "Malice" was released off the album. A music video was made for the song "Dantōdai kara ai o komete (断頭台から愛を込めて)".

== Background ==
Definition discusses the existence of humanity, what humanity is, and thus was released in two versions, with two different covers: one with the theme "organic" and the other being "mechanic". Type A features a human being on the cover being eroded by technology, while Type B depicts an AI robot. The two types begin with two different songs, "ivy" and "Phantom", respectively, which discuss the "illusion of humanity" from different perspectives.

== Track listing ==
All lyrics are written by yo-ka.

A type
No.	Title	Music	Length
1.	"ivy"	Kei	4:14
2.	"Malice"	Kei	4:28
3.	"Uso to waltz o (嘘とワルツを)"	yo-ka	4:31
4.	"[dignity]"	Kei	3:59
5.	"Hell Glide (ヘルグライド)"	yo-ka	2:54
6.	"Species"	Kei	3:51
7.	"Dantōdai kara ai o komete (断頭台から愛を込めて)"	Kei	4:45
Total length:			28:42

A type, DVD extra
No.	Title	Length
1.	"Dantōdai kara ai o komete (断頭台から愛を込めて)" (music video)

B type
No.	Title	Music	Length
1.	"Phantom (ファントム)"	yo-ka	3:46
Total length:			28:14
