= Absolutely =

Absolutely may refer to:

== Music ==
- Absolutely (musician), the stage name of British singer-songwriter Abby-Lynn Keen
- Absolutely (Boxer album), 1977
- Absolutely (Madness album), 1980
- Absolutely (Eurogliders album), 1985
  - "Absolutely" (Eurogliders song), from the aforementioned album
- Absolutely (ABC album), 1990
- Absolutely (Rik Emmett album), 1990
- Absolutely (Sister Hazel album), 2006
- Absolutely (Dijon album), 2021
- "Absolutely (Story of a Girl)", a 2000 song by the band Nine Days
- "Absolutely", a 2004 song by the band 213 from their debut album The Hard Way

== Other uses ==
- Absolutely (TV series), a British comedy sketch show
- Abso Lutely Productions, a film and television production company

== See also ==
- Absolute (disambiguation)
- Absoluteness, a description of formulas that have the same truth value in each of some class of structures
- Absolution (disambiguation)
- Definitely (disambiguation)
- Maybe (disambiguation)
- Possibly (disambiguation)
