= Walking into the Night =

2001 novel by Olaf Olafsson

- First edition (Icelandic)
- Author: Olaf Olafsson
- Original title: Höll minninganna
- Language: English
- Genre: Fiction
- Publisher: Vaka-Helgafell (Iceland); Pantheon (US)
- Publication date: 2001
- Publication place: United States
- English publication date: October 28, 2003
- Media type: Print (Hardcover, Paperback)
- Pages: 272 (Hardcover); 272 (Paperback)
- ISBN: 0-375-42254-4

Walking into the Night is a novel from Olaf Olafsson about a man's hidden past and the immutability of love and loss.

== Synopsis ==
For twenty years, Christian Benediktsson has worked as the butler to newspaper magnate William Randolph Hearst. His days are spent managing Hearst's schedule and running the household. Privately, however, he thinks about his past: previously a husband and father in Iceland, he left his family for an actress in New York, where the relationship ended in death and financial ruin. Following those events, he relocated to Hearst's estate in California. No one else knows about his former life as a husband, father, businessman, and lover, and he eventually stops acknowledging that past.

== Critical reception ==
"Olafsson tells the life story of William Randolph Hearst's fictional butler – deftly and grippingly… Clear-eyed and captivating, Olafsson writes effortlessly, seemingly incapable of a dull paragraph or page. His people are real, period atmosphere and detail unobtrusively perfect, his novel a gem and a small masterpiece." – Kirkus Review

"An elegant and moving novel that knows, and shows, the value of tact, selection and economy." – The Independent (UK)
