= Diaura =

Japanese visual kei rock band

Background information
- Origin: Tokyo, Japan
- Genres: Alternative rock; alternative metal; post-grunge; nu metal; metalcore; progressive rock
- Years active: 2010–present
- Labels: Ains, Galaxy, NDG
- Members: yo-ka Kei; Shoya; Tatsuya
- Past members: Yuu
- Website: Official website

Diaura (ディオーラ, Diōra) is a four-member Japanese visual kei rock band, currently signed to their own record label, called NDG, they were formerly under Galaxy Inc. and then Ains. The band formed in December 2009 by yo-ka (ex-Valluna and Megamasso roadie), Kei (ex-Valluna), Yuu (ex-Valluna), and later recruited Shoya. Their current fourth member and then-support drummer, Tatsuya, was later on added to the group as an official member after ex-drummer Yuu's departure from the group due to tendinitis. Their debut single "Shitsuyoku no Seiiki" was released on January 19, 2011. Diaura released their first full studio album Genesis on March 21, 2012 and their second full studio album Focus on December 4, 2013.

== History ==
Yo-ka and Yuu first formed a short-lived band called Marely, and after they disbanded, yo-ka joined Valluna, which quickly became popular with fans of visual kei. When Valluna split, yo-ka and guitarist Kei founded Diaura (short for "Dictatorial Aura") with drummer Yuu, and later their agent helped to recruit bassist Shoya. Their first album, Genesis was released in March 2012 to critical acclaim, Allmusic writer John D. Buchanan gave it four and a half stars, saying "this is one of the best debuts VK had ever seen, spectacularly fulfilling Diaura's promise and cementing their place as one of the pre-eminent bands in the scene."

Drummer Yuu announced his departure from the band in October 2012 due to tendonitis.

In April 2013, support drummer Tatsuya officially joined the band.

Moving to a new label, Blowgrow, allowed them to have access to better quality recording studios which elevated their sound significantly. They later returned to Ains, and then in August 2019, the band established its own indie label called NDG.

== Influence ==
Kei cited Kouichi from Laputa as his primary influence. Tatsuya stated that he was into Luna Sea, Laputa and JUDY AND MARY.

== Members ==
Current
yo-ka – vocals
Kei (佳衣) – guitar
Shoya (翔也) – bass
Tatsuya (達也) – drums
Former
Yuu (勇) – drums (2010–2012)

== Discography ==
=== Studio albums ===
Title	Album details	Peak positions	
Title	Album details	Oricon	
Title	Album details	Indies Albums	Weekly Chart
Genesis	Release date: March 21, 2012		168
Focus	Release date: December 4, 2013		49
Triangle	Release date: November 26, 2014	2	33
Versus	Release date: November 29, 2017	2	30
R.I.P.	Release date: October 6, 2021	3	34

=== Compilation albums ===
Title	Album details	Peak positions	
Title	Album details	Oricon	
Title	Album details	Indies Albums	Weekly Chart
Incomplete	Release date: December 15, 2015	2	38

=== Mini albums ===
Title	Album details	Peak positions	
Title	Album details	Oricon	
Title	Album details	Indies Albums	Weekly Chart
Dictator	Release date: August 10, 2011		195
Reborn	Release date: March 13, 2013	4	68
My Resistance	Release date: November 16, 2016	3	27
Definition	Release date: February 13, 2019	6	43
Antism	Release date: April 5, 2023	—	39

=== Singles ===
Title	Single details	Peak positions	
Title	Single details	Oricon	
Title	Single details	Indies Singles	Weekly Chart
Shitsuyoku no Seiiki (失翼の聖域)	Release date: January 19, 2011		
Beautiful Creature	Release date: February 23, 2011; 2nd Press: June 15, 2011	10	
Imperial "Core"	Release date: November 2, 2011 Tracklist: 1. SE-C.O.R.E-; 2. Imperial "CORE"; 3. Kesshō (結晶)		134
Reason for Treason	Release date: June 9, 2012		
To Enemy	Release date: July 7, 2012		
Evils (Evil/Inferiority Complex)	Release date: July 28, 2012 Tracklist Regular edition: 1. evil 2. Inferiority Complex; 3. to Enemy (remastered); Limited edition: CD: 1. evil 2. Inferiority Complex; DVD: 1. Reason for Treason (MV)	6	65
Whiteness	Release date: February 20, 2013		97
Sirius/Lily	Release date: July 10, 2013 Tracklist A type CD: 1. Sirius; 2. Lily; DVD: 1. Sirius (MV); 2. Lily (MV); B type: 1. Sirius; 2. Lily; 3. deadly number	2	36
Shitsuyoku no Seiiki (失翼の聖域)	Release date: August 28, 2013; Re-recording; Tracklist: 1. Shitsuyoku no Seiiki (失翼の聖域); 2. Todokanu Tegami (届かぬ手紙); 3. Judgement; DVD: 1. Shitsuyoku no Seiiki (失翼の聖域) (MV)	7	61
Horizon (ホライゾン)	Release date: July 9, 2014; TVS Hot Wave opening theme song; Tracklist: 1. Horizon (ホライゾン); 2. Yugamu kyūtai (歪む球体); DVD: 1. Horizon (ホライゾン) (MV)	2	19
Silent Majority	Release date: July 9, 2014 Tracklist: 1. Silent Majority; 2. Jūsan-kai wa zetsubō (十三階は絶望); DVD: 1. Silent Majority (MV)	3	20
Blind message	Release date: September 3, 2014	4	42
Ruin	Release date: May 20, 2015 Tracklist A type: 1. Ruin; 2. Sakura sacramento (桜サクラメント); DVD: 1. Ruin (MV); 2. Documentary of Ruin; B type: 1. Ruin; 2. Sakura sacramento (桜サクラメント); DVD: 1. from Under (MV shooting); 2. Documentary of from Under; C type: 1. Ruin; 2. Sakura sacramento (桜サクラメント); 3. from Under	3	30
Enigma	Release date: March 30, 2016 Tracklist A type: 1. Enigma; 2. Rakuin: stigma (烙印-stigma-); DVD: 1. Enigma (MV); B type: 1. Enigma; 2. Rakuin: stigma (烙印-stigma-); 3. Kaigan (開眼)	9	26
Gekkō (月光)	Release date: August 3, 2016 Tracklist A type: 1. Gekkō (月光); 2. Toge (棘); DVD: 1. Gekkō (月光) (MV); B type: 1. Gekkō (月光); 2. Toge (棘); 3. Dark Age	3	30
Noah/Shangri-La (シャングリラ)	Release date: July 10, 2014 Tracklist A type: 1. Noah; 2. Shangri-La (シャングリラ); DVD: 1. Noah (MV); 2. Shangri-La (シャングリラ) (MV); B type: 1. Noah; 2. Shangri-La (シャングリラ); 3. Ranse dystopia (乱世ディストピア)	3	24
Unmei Kaika (運命開化)	Release date: July 18, 2018; Released under the alter-ego name Diōra (ディオーラ); Tracklist: 1. Unmei kaika (運命開化); 2. Sōgoku (葬獄); 3. Nemesis (ネメシス)	2	30
Malice	Release date: October 24, 2018 Tracklist A type: 1. Malice; 2. Resonance (レゾナンス); DVD: 1. Malice (MV); B type: 1. Malice; 2. Resonance (レゾナンス); 3. Human Noise	5	22
Sacrifice	Release date: October 2, 2019 Tracklist: 1. Sacrifice; 2. Unmei Kaika (運命開化) （Live at 2018.09.03 ZeppDiverCity Tokyo）	10	
FINALE-Last Rebellion-	Release date: October 2, 2019 Tracklist A type: 1. Finale; 2. Signal; DVD: 1. Finale (MV); B type: 1. Finale; 2. Signal; DVD: 1. “July 13, 2019 Hattori Ryokuchi Outdoor Music Hall” Live Video; C type: 1. Finale; 2. Signal; 3. Mind Mirror	2	21
Envy	Release date: March 4, 2020 Tracklist A Type: 1. Envy; 2. Drain Drain; DVD: 1. Envy MV; B Type: 1. Envy; 2. Drain Drain; DVD: 1. 2019.12.24 Ebisu LIQUIDROOM Dictatorial X'mas; C Type: 1. Envy; 2. Drain Drain; 3. Inner Core	9	40
Hydra	Release date: April 1, 2020 Tracklist A Type: 1. Hydra; 2. Poise (ポワゾ); DVD: 1. Hydra (MV); B Type: 1. Hydra; 2. Poise (ポワゾ); DVD: 1. 2019.12.24 Ebisu LIQUIDROOM Dictatorial X'mas (恵比寿LIQUIDROOM Dictatorial X'mas); C Type: 1. Hydra; 2. Poise (ポワゾ); 3. Promised Land	15	28
Gokusai (獄彩)	Release date: July 1, 2020; digital only		
Saihate ni Furu Yuki (最果てに降る雪)	Release date: October 14, 2020		24
Vermillion	Release date: April 6, 2022	2	21

- The singles where tracklists are not added separately only feature the title song.
- Venue-only single releases were not included in the list due to their limited availability

=== DVDs ===
- 独-Dictator-裁 (August 3, 2011)
- Master (November 30, 2011)
- Judgement Day (August 28, 2012)
