= Absolution (Olafsson novel) =

1991 novel by Olaf Olafsson

- First edition (Icelandic)
- Author: Olaf Olafsson
- Original title: Fyrirgefning syndanna
- Language: English
- Genre: Fiction
- Publisher: Vaka-Helgafell (Iceland); Pantheon (US)
- Publication date: 1991
- Publication place: United States
- English publication date: 1994
- Media type: Print (Hardcover, Paperback)
- Pages: 259 (Hardcover); 272 (Paperback)
- ISBN: 0-679-42891-7

Absolution is a 1991 novel by Olaf Olafsson about the mind of a man haunted by the crime he planned half a century earlier.

== Synopsis ==
When he died, Peter Peterson left behind the trappings of a seemingly charmed life: a vast fortune, two children, and a stately Park Avenue address. But he left something else behind: a sheaf of confessions about a dark period of his youth. In pages written weeks before his death, he reveals a crime of passion, committed in the throes of unrequited love, that has burdened him for his entire life. Yet as he finishes his story, he encounters a surprise that will shake the very foundation of his past. Spanning a boyhood in Iceland to the Nazi occupation of Denmark to a cunning business career in modern-day Manhattan, Absolution echoes Dostoevsky and Ibsen as it masterfully plumbs the darkest corners of a sinister mind and a wounded heart.

== Critical reception ==
“Compulsive reading, and the spare, dry language concentrates the suspense…As cold and lucid as a quartz crystal.” – The Independent on Sunday (UK)
