= Absolute F.C. =

Indonesian football club in West Sumatra

Absolute FC
- Full name: Air Batumbuk Solok United Football Club
- Founded: 16 October 2019; 6 years ago
- Ground: Tuanku Tabiang Stadium; Solok, West Sumatra
- Owner: Askab PSSI Solok
- Chairman: Budi Rahmatul Huda
- Coach: Aprianto
- League: Liga 3
- 2021: 4th in Group C, (West Sumatra zone)
Home colours	Away colours

Air Batumbuk Solok United Football Club (simply known as Absolute FC) is an Indonesian football club based in Solok Regency, West Sumatra. They currently compete in the Liga 3 and their homeground is Tuanku Tabiang Stadium.
