= Absolute Power (Pro-Pain album) =

Studio album by Pro-Pain
- Released: May 5, 2010
- Genre: Groove metal, thrash metal, hardcore punk
- Length: 37:13
- Label: AFM

Pro-Pain chronology
No End in Sight (2008)	Absolute Power (2010)

Absolute Power is the twelfth studio album by American metal band Pro-Pain. It was released on May 5, 2010, by AFM Records.

== Critical reception ==
The NewReview gave the album a 4 out of 5 rating and stated: "Pro-Pain broke the chains shackling me to generic, current music by showing that older can definitely be superior."

== Track listing ==
1. "Unrestrained" – 3:47
2. "Destroy the Enemy" – 4:47
3. "Stand My Ground" – 3:38
4. "Road to Nowhere" – 4:43
5. "AWOL" – 2:49
6. "Hell on Earth" – 4:57
7. "Divided We Stand" – 1:48
8. "Gone Rogue (I Apologize)" – 4:45
9. "Rise of the Antichrist" – 3:20
10. "Hate Coalition" – 2:38

== Personnel ==
- Gary Meskil – bass, vocals
- Tom Klimchuck – lead, rhythm guitar
- Marshall Stephens – rhythm guitar
- Rick Halverson – drums
