= Absolute (Time-Life album) =

Absolute is a music compilation album under both the Body and Soul and Midnight Soul collection series. Distributed by Time Life through its music division, the album was released January 28, 2003, originally under the Body and Soul series. It was re-released in 2008 when Time Life launched the Midnight Soul series.

It is distributed both in two versions: the single CD sold-in-stores and the Time-Life exclusive version on the double CD set. The sold-in-stores version features seventeen urban contemporary R&B hits, with many of them released in the neo soul music era. The Time Life exclusive version features 24 hits on two CDs, including seven more songs not featured in stores.

== Track listing ==
=== Sold-in-stores version ===
1. Alicia Keys – A Woman's Worth
2. K-Ci & JoJo – All My Life
3. Monica – Angel of Mine
4. Brian McKnight – Anytime
5. Angie Stone – Brotha
6. Boyz II Men – Four Seasons Of Loneliness
7. Rome – I Belong to You (Every Time I See Your Face)
8. Joe – I Wanna Know
9. D'Angelo – Lady
10. Usher – Nice and Slow
11. Deborah Cox – Nobody's Supposed to Be Here
12. Jimmy Cozier – She's All I Got
13. Tyrese – Sweet Lady
14. Luther Vandross – Take You Out
15. Next – Too Close
16. Toni Braxton – Unbreak My Heart
17. Babyface – When Can I See You

=== Time Life exclusive version ===
==== Disc one ====
1. Joe – I Wanna Know
2. D'Angelo – Lady
3. Angie Stone – Brotha
4. Lucy Pearl – Dance Tonight
5. Usher – Nice and Slow
6. Monica – Angel of Mine
7. Rome – I Belong to You (Every Time I See Your Face)
8. K-Ci & JoJo – All My Life
9. En Vogue – Giving Him Something He Can Feel
10. Brian McKnight – Anytime
11. Jimmy Cozier – She's All I Got
12. Tyrese – Sweet Lady

==== Disc two ====
1. Alicia Keys – A Woman's Worth
2. Next – Too Close
3. Luther Vandross – Take You Out
4. Toni Braxton – Unbreak My Heart
5. Babyface – When Can I See You
6. R.L. – Good Man
7. Boyz II Men – Four Seasons Of Loneliness
8. SWV – You're the One
9. Shanice – When I Close My Eyes
10. Tony Rich – Nobody Knows
11. Az Yet and Peter Cetera – Hard to Say I'm Sorry
12. Deborah Cox – Nobody's Supposed to Be Here
