= Incomplete (Diaura album) =

Compilation album by Diaura
- Released: December 15, 2015
- Genre: rock; Heavy metal
- Length: 1:55:02
- Language: Japanese
- Label: Ains

Diaura chronology
Triangle (2014)	Incomplete (2015)	My Resistance (2016)

Incomplete is the first compilation album by Japanese visual kei band Diaura, released on 15 December, 2015, by Ains. It debuted on Oricon's weekly chart at the 38th place, and 2nd on the Indies chart. The album includes 27 tracks on two CDS, with one new track, titled "Black Sheep under the Shallow Sleep". The DVD extra contains footage of the band's Shibuya concert in June 2015.

== Track listing ==
CD 1
No.	Title	Length
1.	"Shitsuyoku no seiiki (失翼の聖域)" (re-arranged)	5:05
2.	"Beautiful Creature" (re-arranged)	4:06
3.	"Dictator" (re-arranged)	4:32
4.	"Imperial Core" (re-arranged)	3:51
5.	"Evil" (re-arranged)	4:17
6.	"Whiteness" (re-arranged)	5:08
7.	"Taidō (胎動)" (re-arranged)	2:41
8.	"Sirius"	4:55
9.	"Menace (メナス)"	3:43
10.	"Silent Majority"	3:40
11.	"Horizon (ホライゾン)"	4:44
12.	"Blind Message"	2:50
13.	"Ruin"	4:22
Total length:		53:54

CD 2
No.	Title	Length
1.	"Virgin Mary" (re-arranged)	4:21
2.	"Master" (re-arranged)	5:10
3.	"Terrors" (re-arranged)	4:33
4.	"Kinshiroku (禁示録)" (re-arranged)	3:41
5.	"Lost November" (re-arranged)	5:47
6.	"To Enemy" (re-arranged)	4:16
7.	"Reborn" (re-arranged)	4:14
8.	"Sister" (re-arranged)	3:56
9.	"Akai kyozō (赤い虚像)"	3:34
10.	"Trigger"	3:49
11.	"Moratorium (モラトリアム)"	4:13
12.	"Shin sekai (新世界)"	3:52
13.	"Garden of Eden" (re-arranged)	5:38
14.	"Black Sheep under the Shallow Sleep"	4:04
Total length:		61:08

DVD
No.	Title	Length
1.	"Diaura Oneman Tour 2015 Progress from Ruins Reality Final at 2015.06.06 DIAURA ONEMAN TOUR2015 PROGRESS FROM RUINS REALITY FINAL at 2015.06.06 Shibuya kōkaidō (DIAURA ONEMAN TOUR2015 PROGRESS FROM RUINS REALITY FINAL at 2015.06.06渋谷公会堂)"
