= The Day the Earth Shook – The Absolute Power =

The Day the Earth Shook - The Absolute Power

Video by Manowar
- Released: November 24, 2006
- Recorded: July 23, 2005
- Genre: Heavy metal, power metal
- Length: 390 minutes
- Label: Magic Circle Music, Steamhammer SPV
- Producer: Joey DeMaio, Neil Johnson

Manowar chronology
Hell on Earth IV (2005)	The Day the Earth Shook - The Absolute Power (2006)	Hell on Earth V (2009)

The Day the Earth Shook – The Absolute Power is a DVD by American heavy metal band Manowar. They recorded their live performance at the Earthshaker Fest 2005 in Germany on July 23, 2005. The band played a selection of songs in accompaniment with the 50 member Bohuslav Martinů Philharmonic Orchestra. During the concert the band was joined on-stage by former Manowar members Ross "The Boss" Friedman, David Shankle, Donnie Hamzik and Kenny Earl "Rhino" Edwards.

The running time of the concert is 1 hour and 59 minutes. The bonus DVD also contains a 45-minute documentary about the making of the festival, a three-hour Fan Convention documentary and other footage. The concert was directed by film director Neil Johnson

The DVD has been certified gold in Germany, selling in excess of 50,000 units sold

== Track listing ==
1. Manowar - 05:30
2. Brothers of Metal - 03:36
3. Call to Arms - 05:09
4. Sun of Death - 02:50
5. Kings of Metal - 03:35
6. Sign of the Hammer - 05:43
7. Blood of My Enemies - 03:31
8. Kill With Power - 04:40
9. Metal Warriors - 03:54
10. The Glory of Achilles - 02:35
11. Metal Daze - 04:37
12. Dark Avenger - 06:58
13. Outlaw - 03:32
14. House of Death - 03:43
15. Herz aus Stahl (German version of Heart of Steel) - 05:19
16. Wagner's Prelude to Act III (Lohengrin) as played by the Bohuslav Martinů Philharmonic Orchestra - 03:28
17. King of Kings - 06:50
18. Warriors of the World United - 06:26
19. Hail and Kill - 07:40
20. Black Wind, Fire and Steel - 09:25
21. Battle Hymn - 14:49
22. The Crown and the Ring - 05:14
