= Absolutism =

Absolutism may refer to:

== Government ==
- Absolutism (European history), period c. 1610 – c. 1789 in Europe
  - Enlightened absolutism, influenced by the Enlightenment (18th- and early 19th-century Europe)
- Absolute monarchy, in which a monarch rules free of laws or legally organized opposition
- Autocracy, a political theory which argues that one person should hold all power
  - Tsarist autocracy, is a form of autocracy (later absolute monarchy) specific to Russia

== Philosophy ==
=== General philosophy ===
- Absolutism, the view that facts are absolute rather than merely relative (sometimes called "universality")

=== Ethics ===
- Moral absolutism, the belief in absolute standards against which moral questions can be judged, regardless of context
- Graded absolutism, the view that a moral absolute, such as "Do not kill", can be greater or lesser than another moral absolute, such as "Do not lie"

=== Hegelian philosophy ===
- Absolute (philosophy), the Hegelian concept of an objective and unconditioned reality, said to underlie perceived objects
- Absolute idealism, an ontologically monistic philosophy attributed to G. W. F. Hegel

== Physics ==
- Absolute theory, in physics
  - Absolute space, a theory that space exists absolutely; contrast with relationalism

== Psychology ==
- Splitting (psychology), also called black-and-white thinking or all-or-nothing thinking
