= Absolution (short story) =

1924 short story by F. Scott Fitzgerald

- Short story by F. Scott Fitzgerald
- Country: United States
- Language: English
- Genre: Short Story

Publication
- Published in: The American Mercury Collected in All the Sad Young Men
- Publication type: Magazine; Short story collection
- Publisher: Scribner's
- Media type: Print

"Absolution" is a short story by American writer F. Scott Fitzgerald. Originally published in The American Mercury in June 1924, the story would later be published in Fitzgerald's third short story collection All the Sad Young Men in 1926.

== Background ==
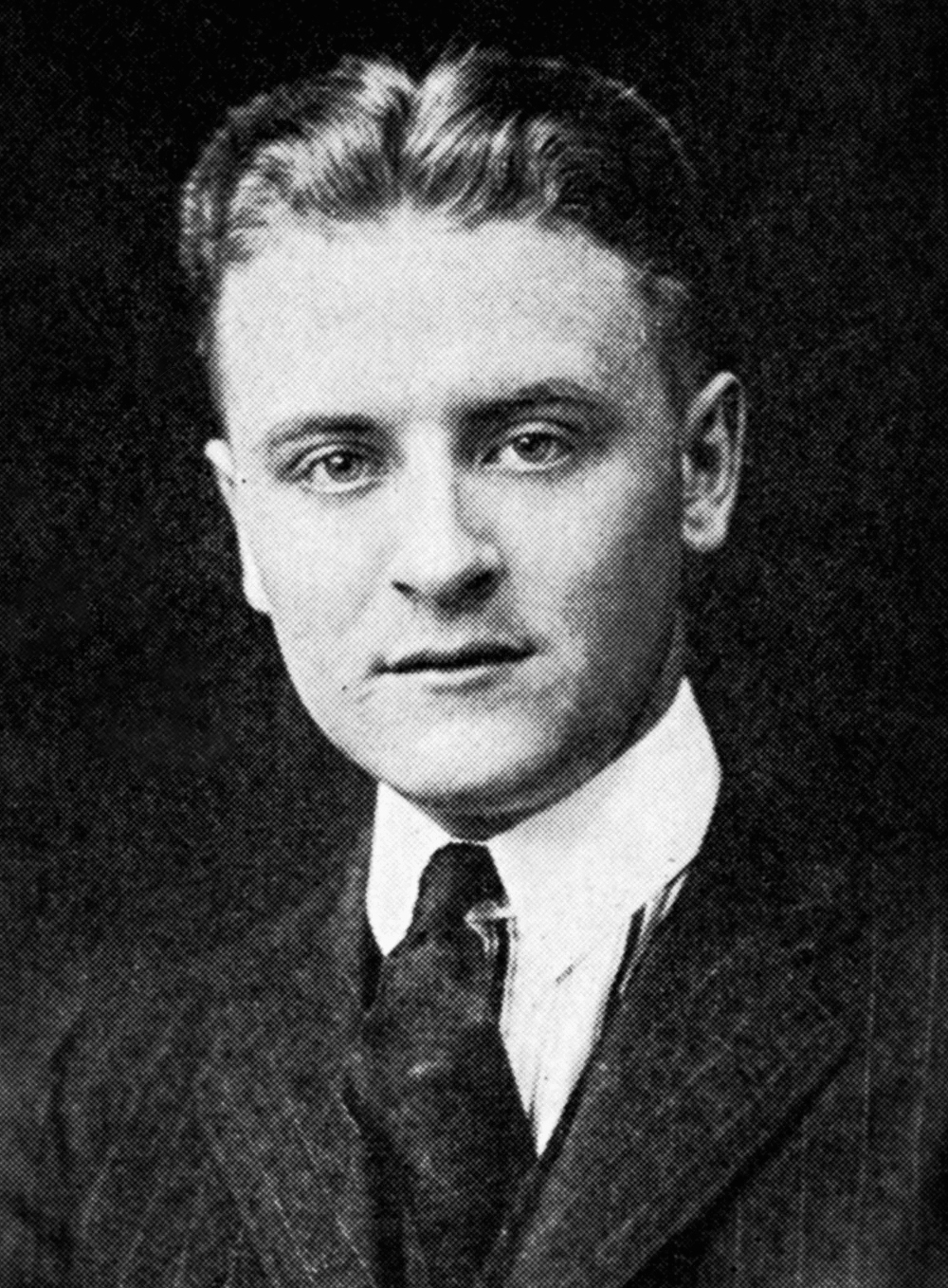
F. Scott Fitzgerald in 1917

Fitzgerald began writing "Absolution" in June 1923. In a letter to Maxwell Perkins, Fitzgerald stated that it was originally intended to be the prologue of his later novel The Great Gatsby, but that it "interrupted with the neatness of the plan". In 1934, Fitzgerald wrote in a letter to a fan that the story was intended to show Gatsby's early life, but was cut to preserve his "sense of mystery".

== Plot summary ==
"Absolution", narrated in the third person, focuses on a young boy named Rudolph Miller, who fantasizes about a self-created alter ego called Blatchford Sarnemington. Rudolph, an 11-year-old Catholic, attends a confession with Father Schwartz. Rudolph describes what he believes is a terrible sin he committed. In a flashback, Rudolph lies to Father Schwartz in a previous confession. Rudolph gets in trouble with his father when he attempts to avoid communion by drinking water before. After telling Father Schwartz about these two instances, Father Schwartz collapses and a startled Rudolph flees.

== Critical reception ==
Upon publication in All the Sad Young Men, the story met with mixed reception. The New York Times wrote that "Absolution" is "simple and stripped of artifice". The Saturday Review of Literature described the story as "first rate. Three quarters of it, at least, is masterly. Then the author falters". The Literary Review of the New York Evening Post praised the story along with the others in All the Sad Young Men.

Contemporary reviewers often focus on the story's connection with The Great Gatsby. Some scholars argue against this connection. They argue that this connection has been overemphasized. Some modern scholars have drawn parallels between "Absolution" and James Joyce's short story "The Sisters".
