= Absolute Power (game) =

Science fiction play-by-mail game

- Other names: Absolute Power 2
- Publishers: Silver Dreamer, Jade Enterprises
- Years active: 1996 to unknown
- Genres: science fiction
- Languages: English
- Playing time: Fixed
- Materials required: Instructions, order sheets, turn results, paper, pencil
- Media type: Play-by-mail or email

Absolute Power is an open-ended, science fiction play-by-mail (PBM) game.

== History and development ==
Silver Dreamer was the game's first publisher. The game launched in 1996. By 2000, Jade Enterprises was publishing the game. It was mixed-moderated and open-ended. Nicky Palmer thought the game a mix between Where Lies the Power and En Garde.

By 2002, the publisher had revised the game to Absolute Power 2. It was then published by Alan Crump of Silver Dreamer.

== Gameplay ==
Absolute Power was a science fiction PBM power game. Players roleplayed a noble family on a set of alien worlds. These worlds were called Capitol, Dentribe, Gaiea, Sahara, and Wisdom. Each turn encompassed one year of game time.

Nicky Palmer used Absolute Power as an example of the type of play that can only be found in PBM, with a player developing and cultivating a religious group (during gameplay) to combat a well-entrenched power group.

== Reception ==
Jeremy Wasden reviewed the game in the September–October 1996 issue of Flagship. He stated, "The game is deep and well-balanced. The options and the ways to achieve power are limitless." He highly recommended the game.

== See also ==
- List of play-by-mail games

== Bibliography ==
- Hayward, Darren (March–April 2000). "So You're Thinking of Playing Absolute Power?". Flagship. No. 84. pp. 4, 6.
- Palmer, Nicky (July 1996). "Mail Bytes: Absolute Power". Flagship. No. 59. p. 41.
- Palmer, Nicky (September–October 1996). "Only in PBM!". Flagship. No. 63. p. 3.
- Parsler, Justin (March–April 1998). "Absolute Power – Imperial Dispatches". Flagship. No. 72. p. 19.
- Wasden, Jeremy (September–October 1996). "Absolute Power". Flagship. No. 63. pp. 4–8.
