= Absolute defence =

Legal argument that, if proven, ends litigation in favor of the defendant

In law, an absolute defence (or defense) is a factual circumstance or argument that, if proven, will end the litigation in favor of the defendant. The concept of an absolute defence is not a rigid one. Statutes frequently use the term merely as a synonym to "full" or "complete". It is more often used, however, as a term of art in both criminal and civil law to refer to an underlying set of facts and laws, not raised by the complaint or indictment, which will require the defendant's dismissal even if the factual allegations of the complaining pleading are true.

Another characteristic of an absolute defence is that, when it is pleaded and proven, it is not subject to mitigation or collateral attack.

Examples of absolute defences include:

- Truth of an allegedly libelous statement (in modern defamation): a person cannot be made to pay damages for a defamatory statement, if the person can show that the statement is true (even if the statement is damaging, and the person said it in bad faith). This is the case in some jurisdictions, including the United States, England and Wales, and Australia.
- Self-defence in a battery case: a person cannot be held criminally liable for battery if they can prove Right of self-defence under certain circumstances (e.g. where retreat was impossible, or where the use of force was not excessive).
- Immunity of various kinds can provide an absolute defence. For example, sovereign immunity, a common law doctrine followed in many jurisdictions, provides a state with immunity unless it agrees to waive its immunity, usually by legislation allowing specific claims to be brought.

Use of the word "absolute" sometimes causes confusion, because even in the law "absolute" is sometimes used simply as a synonym for "full" or "complete". As a term or art, however, there are many complete defences which are not customarily called absolute. Most notably, innocence, while a complete defense to a criminal charge, is not generally termed "absolute", because it involves a material fact of the pleading. On the other hand, double jeopardy is more likely to be termed an absolute defence; an indictment or (other criminal initiating pleading) does not have to state that the defendant has not previously been tried on the crime, but once a defendant shows that he has been previously tried for a crime, his dismissal is required by the US Constitution.

Both an absolute defence and a complete defence must be distinguished from a partial defence, by which the litigant hopes to mitigate the outcome of the litigation, or limit culpability, but the liability is not eliminated. Examples include diminished capacity to understand the wrongfulness of the action, or a mistake of fact that affected the intention of the litigant.
