= Advanta =

American banking company

Advanta (TSO Financial until 1988) was an American banking company. It controlled two banks, Advanta Bank Corp and Advanta National Bank. (It is not associated with Advanta Energy Corp., a California energy consultancy.)

== Growth ==
Advanta began in 1951 as a provider of personal loans to schoolteachers. In 1971, when the current CEO, Dennis Alter, took over the company from his father, it had 30 employees. It served mostly teachers and was licensed only in Pennsylvania, Florida and Delaware. It only provided fixed-payment loans; it did not own any banks nor was it involved in the mortgage or financing business.

In the early 1990s, when its assets were at an all-time high of $25 billion, the firm had the sixth-largest consumer credit card business in the United States, with seven million credit card holders. In 1999, the company sold this part of its business, including and related assets, focusing instead on the small business market.

Advanta's earnings for 2003 were $28.2 million, and it was the third-largest credit card company for small businesses in the United States. In 2004, it employed 1,000 people, primarily in the Philadelphia region, but also in Salt Lake City.

In early 2006, Advanta had $4.9 billion in managed assets, with annual income of just under $400 million. Its credit cards were primarily marketed to entrepreneurs, homegrown businesses and small-scale organizations with fewer than ten employees and less than $3 million in revenue.

== Difficulties ==
In December 2008, developer Liberty Property Trust announced that it had stopped its plans to build a $55 million, 200,000-square-foot (19,000 m^{2}) headquarters for Advanta in Upper Dublin Township, Pennsylvania. In February 2009, Advanta said it had lost $43.8 million in the fourth quarter of its fiscal year, primarily because of credit losses. The company said it would cut its dividends and expenses, and lay off 300 of its 900 employees. It also notified its credit card holders that their interest rates would be raised, from as low as 6 percent, to more than 30 percent, regardless of the holder's credit score. In mid-March 2009, the stock was selling at 24 cents per share, down from its mid-2007 high of almost $30 per share.

On May 11, 2009, the company announced that it would close its credit cards to new charges as of June 10, 2009, and that the investment vehicles it employed to fund the credit card balances had gone into early amortization, effectively terminating the company's access to funds with which to accept new charges. It also announced an effort to buy back its senior investment notes at between 65 and 75 percent of face value.

In late May 2009, the company announced it was moving up the closing of all 1 million of its small business credit card accounts to June 1, and exiting the credit card business as of June 1. In early June, regulators refused to allow Advanta to improve its balance sheet by buying back $1.4 billion of its senior debt notes at a discount. Advanta had planned to pay between 65 percent and 75 percent of the face value of the notes.

At the beginning of July 2009, Advanta was directed by the FDIC to stop accepting insured deposits and to repay $35 million to consumers who were improperly denied cash back bonuses or whose accounts had been improperly repriced.

In mid-July 2009, the company announced it would lay off half its remaining workforce, going from approximately 400 employees to fewer than 200. On July 20, 2009, the company revealed that the default rate on its credit cards had reached a previously unheard-of 56.95%.

In late July 2009, the company was cited as offering dubious investment notes to the public via newspaper ads, but the same article noted that the portion of its website through which the company had been offering the notes was no longer functional.

On August 10, 2009, Advanta announced that the way forward for them was to find "a plan for new business opportunities" after posting a second-quarter loss of $330 million.

On August 20, 2009, Advanta announced that its chargeoffs had returned to 24.02% following June's peak, June having been so high because of the change from charging off at 180 days of delinquency to charging off at 120 days, however the percentage of cards 30 days late had risen to 9.98% from 8.28%, portending a rise in future chargeoffs.

On September 21, 2009, Advanta announced that its chargeoffs had declined to 22.19%; however, 30-day lates had risen to 11.57%.

On October 14, 2009, media outlets carried a story that a class action against the company was being readied on behalf of investors.

In May 2010, many business card holders were filing the Federal Trade Commission, Better Business Bureau, and AG complaints with regulatory authorities in Utah.

== Bankruptcy ==
On November 8, 2009, Advanta filed for Chapter 11 bankruptcy.

On March 19, 2010, Utah state regulators seized Advanta Bank Corp. The Federal Deposit Insurance Corporation was made the bank's receiver. The FDIC estimates the cost of the failure to its Deposit Insurance Fund to be approximately $635.6 million.

== Reorganization ==
The FDIC has arranged with Zions National Bank to accept Government ACH deposits for Advanta Bank Corp. depositors. The credit card accounts that still had balances are now being serviced by Cardworks Servicing, LLC of Pittsburgh, Pennsylvania. Some customers reported "phantom payments" they never made being applied to their account in effort to revalidate the debt and restart the statute of limitations on their several-year-old defaults.

On November 2, 2010, Advanta Corp. and its affiliated debtors developed a financial plan. In February 2011, pursuant to and in accordance with the Joint Plan of Advanta Corp., AC Trust, ASSC Trust and Advanta Finance Trust has made the initial distribution: Advanta National Bank has $100 million in cash and equivalents on hand, also about $138 million of senior retail investment notes and the many offices in the United States, to continues with the banking operations. Advanta Bank Corp. had $2.7 billion portfolio of managed receivables from 360,000 credit cards and other loan customers.

On November 4, 2011, AC Trust in the Advanta Corp., commenced Chapter 5 preferential transfer recovery litigation in the District of Delaware.
