= Definition (disambiguation) =

A definition is a statement of the meaning of a term.

Definition may also refer to:

== Science, mathematics and computing ==
- In computer programming languages, a declaration that reserves memory for a variable or gives the body of a subroutine
- Defining equation (physical chemistry), physico-chemical quantities defined in terms of others, in the form of an equation
- Dynamical system (definition), description of a mathematical model, determined by a system of coupled differential equations
- Circular definition, lexicographic, linguistic and logical aspects
- Mathematics:
  - Intensional definition
  - Elementary definition
  - Recursive definition
  - Field of definition
  - A continuous function
  - A well-defined function

== Music and TV ==
- High-definition television, a television format with higher resolution
- Definition (album), a 1992 studio album by American crossover thrash band Dirty Rotten Imbeciles
- Definition (TV series), a long-running Canadian game show of the 1970s and 1980s
- Definition (Jersey EP), 2001
- Definition (Diaura EP), 2019
- "Definition" (song), a 1998 song by Black Star
- "Definition", a song by Mabel from About Last Night..., 2022
- "Definitions" (How I Met Your Mother), a 2009 television episode

== Other ==
- #define, a macro in the C programming language
- Defined (album), a 2005 operatic pop album
- Definitions (Plato), a dictionary of about 185 philosophical terms sometimes included in the corpus of Plato's works
- Dogmatic definition, the pronunciation of religious doctrine by a Pope or an ecumenical council
