= Yo-ka =

yo-ka
- Also known as: yo-ka
- Born: October 31, 1987 (age 38); Fukushima Prefecture
- Genres: Rock; heavy metal
- Occupations: Singer; songwriter
- Instruments: Vocals; guitar
- Labels: Ains, NDG
- Member of: Diaura
- Formerly of: Valluna
- Website: Official blog

yo-ka (よーか, yōka; born October 31, 1987 in Fukushima Prefecture) is a Japanese songwriter, lyricist and the vocalist of visual kei band Diaura. He is the main lyricist of the band, but also composes music, along with guitarist Kei. He also works as a radio DJ. His birth name is not publicly known.

== Life and career ==
Yo-ka was born in a small village in Fukushima Prefecture. He has an older brother, and his father is a chef. He attended a private Christian primary school. His parents liked listening to folk pop, folk rock and jazz, which made an early influence on yo-ka's own music taste. His favourite performers at the time were Kōzō Murashita, Yōsui Inoue and the band Anzen Chitai. Yo-ka started liking visual kei in middle school, where his biggest musical influence were Pierrot. He also liked listening to Dir En Grey and Kuroyume. Yo-ka first started singing in a band at the age of 13, covering Luna Sea songs. According to him, his singing was "very bad" at this point. He was often made fun of being a singer in junior high school, thus he decided to learn playing the guitar and started composing songs on a guitar, however, he only learned about chords later on.

After graduating from high school, Yo-ka decided to study music at a college but after nine months he thought it was not possible to learn songwriting in school, and thus moved to Tokyo on his own to create a band. He worked in a konbini to support his living. He met Yuu, with whom he founded a band that soon disbanded. Yo-ka then got to know Kei and found his music intriguing. They started playing together in Valluna, which also disbanded quite soon. Diaura was established from its former members, with the addition of Shoya on bass.

Since August 2019, Yo-ka is a radio DJ for Radio3 Sendai FM, together with Gotcharocka singer (and former singer of ヴィドール aka Vidoll) Jui (樹威). The program is called Michinoku Double (Note: The Japanese title spells this davuru, i.e. 'douvle'. As a Japanese speaker would pronounce both words the same, this likely for stylistic reasons alone.) Dragon (みちのくダヴルドラゴン) and focuses on visual kei bands of the Tōhoku region. It airs every other Monday for half an hour.

== Discography ==
=== Valluna ===
The discography includes official releases only. Records distributed for free at concerts are not listed here.

Singles

- Sonzai riyū (存在理由) (2009)
- Parasite Eve (2009)
- Promise (2009)
- Neo Infernal (2010)
- Seija no mōshin (聖者の盲信)
- Silent Prayer (2010)
- Funeral Days (2010)

Mini album

- Distopia (2010)

Compilation album

- Complete (2011)
