= F. Scott Fitzgerald =

American writer (1896–1940)

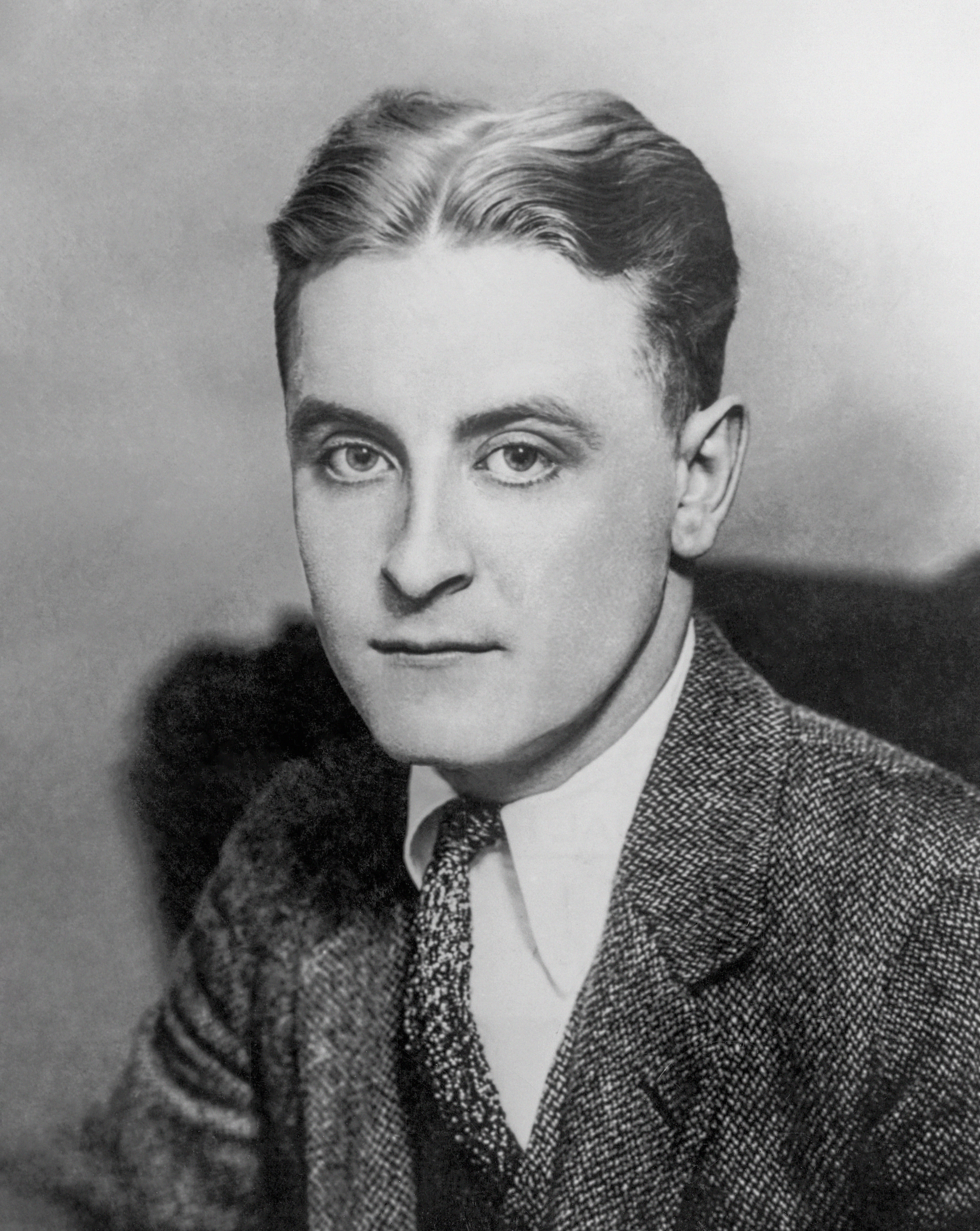
- Fitzgerald in 1921
- Born: Francis Scott Key Fitzgerald; September 24, 1896; Saint Paul, Minnesota, U.S.
- Died: December 21, 1940 (aged 44); Los Angeles, California, U.S.
- Resting place: Saint Mary's Cemetery; Rockville, Maryland, U.S.
- Education: Princeton University (no degree)
- Occupations: Writer; essayist
- Spouse: Zelda Sayre (m. 1920)
- Children: Frances Scott Fitzgerald
- Writing career
- Period: 1920–1940
- Notable works: This Side of Paradise (1920); The Great Gatsby (1925); Tender Is the Night (1934)
- Movement: Modernism

Francis Scott Key Fitzgerald (September 24, 1896 – December 21, 1940), widely known as F. Scott Fitzgerald or simply Scott Fitzgerald, was an American novelist, essayist, and short story writer. He is most notable for his novels depicting the flamboyance and excess of the Jazz Age, a term that he popularized in his short story collection Tales of the Jazz Age. He published four novels, four story collections, and 164 short stories. He achieved transient success and fortune in the 1920s, but did not receive critical acclaim until after his death. He is now widely regarded as one of the greatest American writers of the 20th century.

Fitzgerald was born into a middle-class family in Saint Paul, Minnesota, but he was raised primarily in New York. He attended Princeton University, where he befriended the future literary critic Edmund Wilson. He had a failed romantic relationship with Chicago socialite Ginevra King and dropped out of Princeton in 1917 to join the Army during World War I. While stationed in Alabama, he met Zelda Sayre, a Southern debutante who belonged to Montgomery's exclusive country-club set. She initially rejected Fitzgerald's marriage proposal due to his lack of financial prospects, but she agreed to marry him after the success of his debut novel This Side of Paradise (1920). The novel became a cultural sensation and cemented his reputation as one of the eminent writers of the decade. He struggled with alcoholism throughout the decade.

The Beautiful and Damned (1922) brought Fitzgerald further fame. To maintain his affluent lifestyle, he wrote numerous stories for popular magazines such as The Saturday Evening Post, Collier's Weekly, and Esquire. He frequented Europe during this period, where he befriended modernist writers and artists of the "Lost Generation" expatriate community, including Ernest Hemingway. The Great Gatsby (1925) received generally favorable reviews but was a commercial failure, selling fewer than 23,000 copies in its first year. Despite its lackluster debut, The Great Gatsby is hailed by some literary critics as the "Great American Novel". Fitzgerald finished Tender Is the Night (1934) following the deterioration of his wife's mental health and her placement in a mental institution for schizophrenia.

Fitzgerald struggled financially because of the declining popularity of his works during the Great Depression. He moved to Hollywood where he embarked on an unsuccessful career as a screenwriter. While living in Hollywood, he cohabited with columnist Sheilah Graham, his final companion before his death. He attained sobriety only to die of a heart attack in 1940 at age 44. Edmund Wilson edited and published the unfinished The Last Tycoon (1941). Wilson described Fitzgerald's style: "romantic, but also cynical; he is bitter as well as ecstatic; astringent as well as lyrical. He casts himself in the role of playboy, yet at the playboy he incessantly mocks. He is vain, a little malicious, of quick intelligence and wit, and has the Irish gift for turning language into something iridescent and surprising."

== Life ==
=== Childhood and early years ===
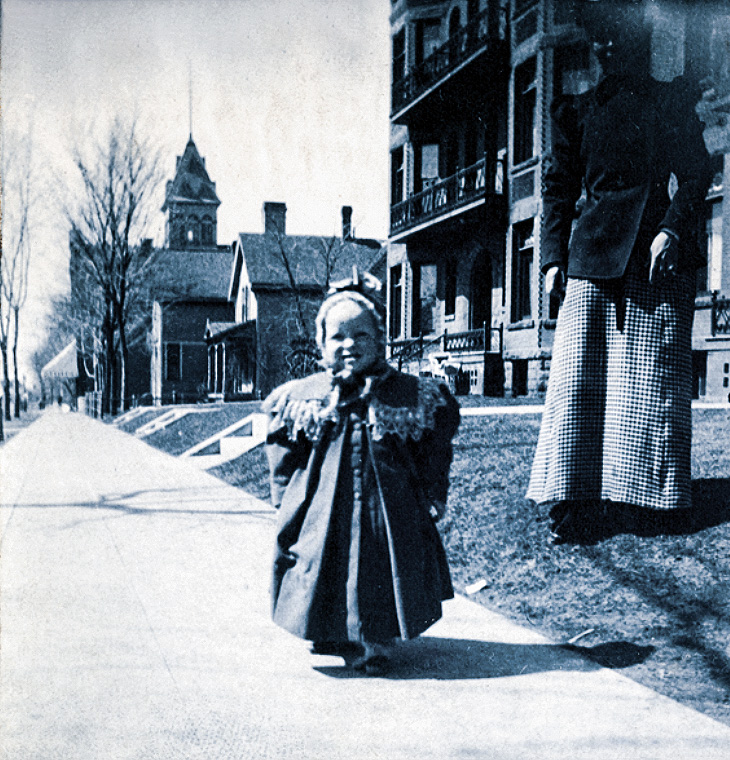
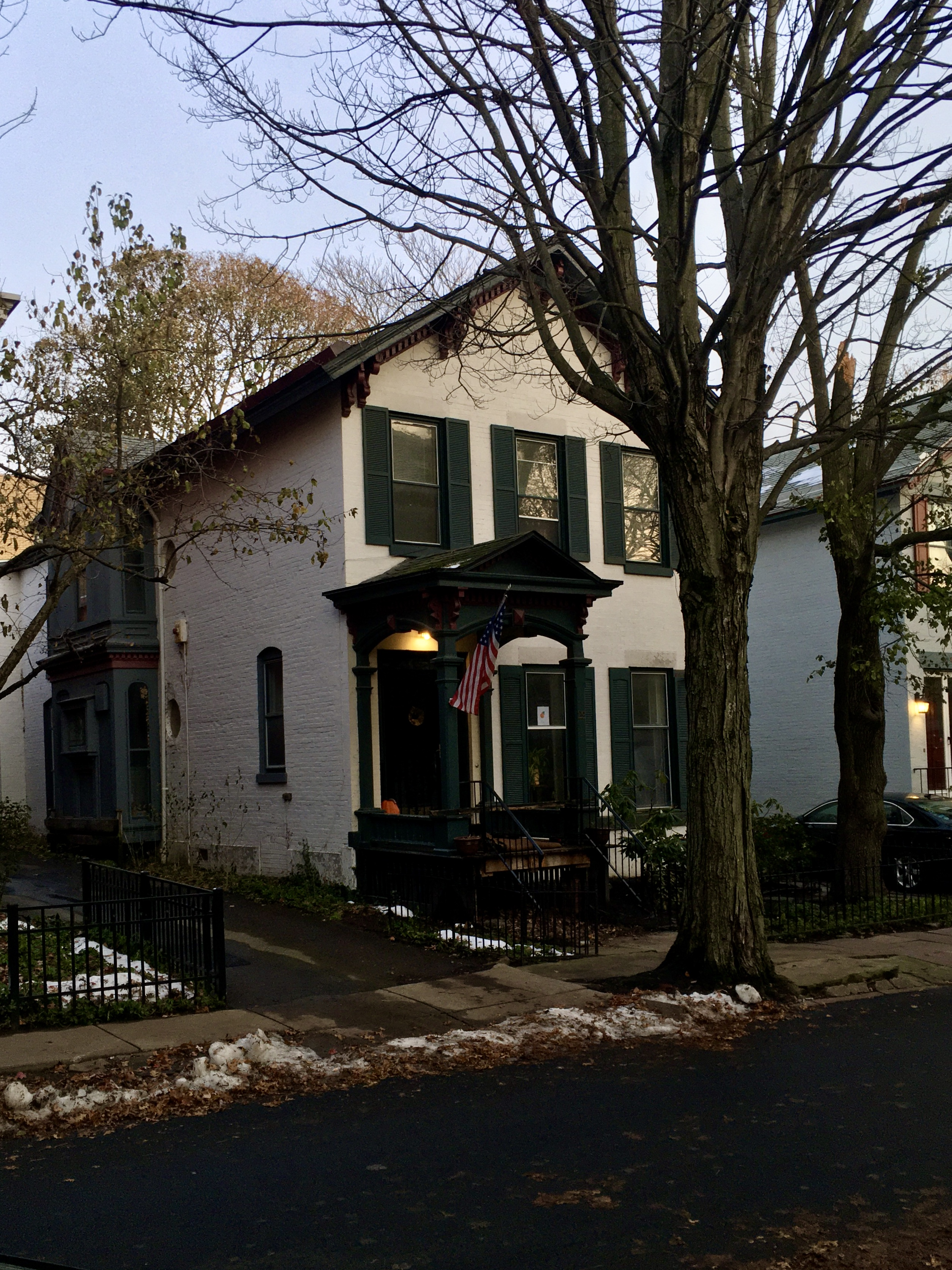
Fitzgerald (left) as a child in St. Paul, Minnesota. After his birth, his parents moved to a rented two-story house (right) in Buffalo, New York.

Born on September 24, 1896, in Saint Paul, Minnesota, to a middle-class Catholic family, Francis Scott Key Fitzgerald was named after Francis Scott Key, a distant cousin who wrote the lyrics in 1814 for the song "The Star-Spangled Banner", which became the American national anthem. (Note: Fitzgerald was also named after his deceased sister, Louise Scott Fitzgerald, one of two sisters who died shortly before his birth.) His mother was Mary "Molly" McQuillan Fitzgerald, the daughter of an Irish immigrant who became wealthy as a wholesale grocer.

His father, Edward Fitzgerald, descended from Irish and English ancestry, and had moved to Minnesota from Maryland after the American Civil War to open a wicker-furniture manufacturing business. Edward's first cousin twice removed, Mary Surratt, was hanged in 1865 for conspiring to assassinate Abraham Lincoln. Throughout his life, Scott disliked mentioning his family's connection to Confederates such as Mary Surratt, whom he privately denigrated.

One year after Fitzgerald's birth, his father's wicker-furniture manufacturing business failed, and the family moved to Buffalo, New York, where his father joined Procter & Gamble as a salesman. Fitzgerald spent the first decade of his childhood primarily in Buffalo with a brief interlude in Syracuse between January 1901 and September 1903. His parents sent him to two Catholic schools on Buffalo's West Side—first Holy Angels Convent (1903–1904) and then Nardin Academy (1905–1908). As a boy, Fitzgerald was described by his peers as unusually intelligent with a keen interest in literature.

Procter & Gamble fired his father in March 1908, and the family returned to Saint Paul. Although his alcoholic father was now destitute, his mother's inheritance supplemented the family income and allowed them to continue living a middle-class lifestyle. Fitzgerald attended St. Paul Academy from 1908 to 1911. At 13, Fitzgerald had his first piece of fiction published in the school newspaper. In 1911, Fitzgerald's parents sent him to the Newman School, a Catholic prep school in Hackensack, New Jersey. At Newman, Father Sigourney Fay recognized his literary potential and encouraged him to become a writer.

=== Princeton and Ginevra King ===
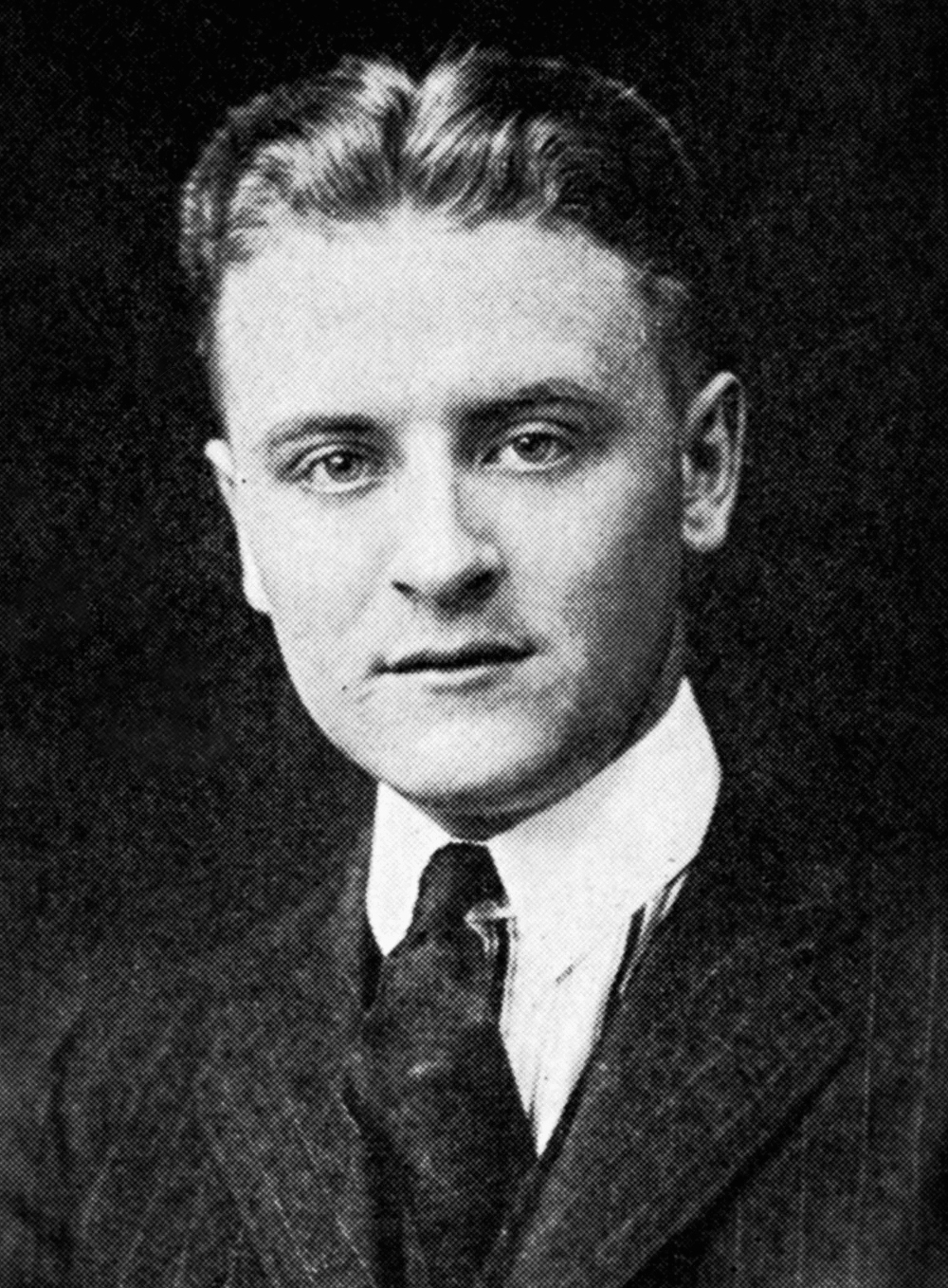
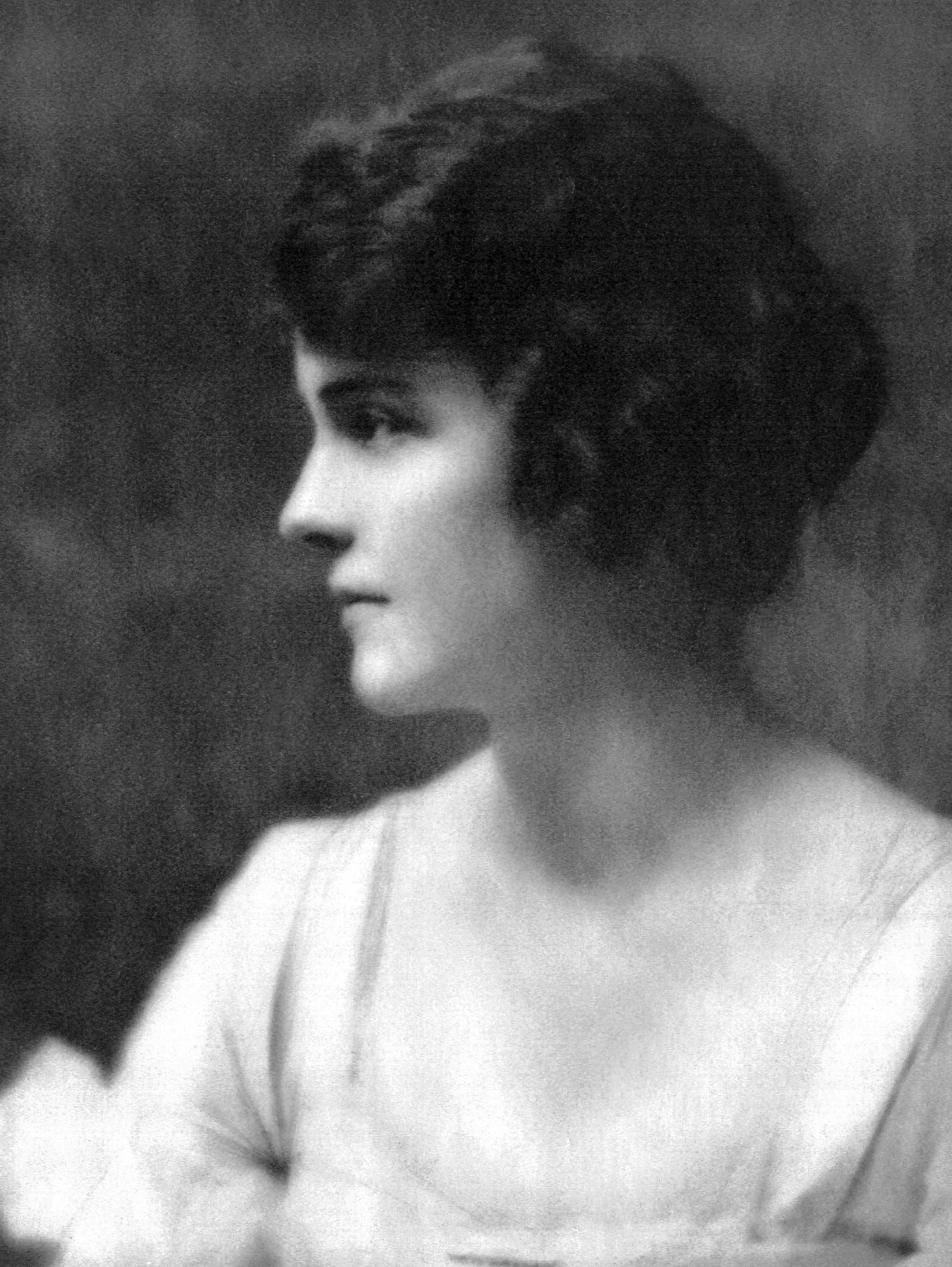
F. Scott Fitzgerald c. 1917 and Chicago socialite Ginevra King c. 1918

After graduating from Newman in 1913, Fitzgerald enrolled at Princeton University and became one of the few Catholics in the student body. While at Princeton, Fitzgerald shared a room and became long time friends with John Biggs Jr., who later helped the author find a home in Delaware. As the semesters passed, he formed close friendships with classmates Edmund Wilson and John Peale Bishop, both of whom would later aid his literary career. Determined to be a successful writer, Fitzgerald wrote stories and poems for the Princeton Triangle Club, the Princeton Tiger, and the Nassau Lit.

During his sophomore year, the 18-year-old Fitzgerald returned home to Saint Paul during Christmas break where he met and fell in love with 16-year-old Chicago debutante Ginevra King. The couple began a romantic relationship spanning several years. She would become his literary model for the characters of Isabelle Borgé in This Side of Paradise, Daisy Buchanan in The Great Gatsby, and many others. While Fitzgerald attended Princeton, Ginevra attended Westover, a Connecticut women's school. He visited Ginevra at Westover until her expulsion for flirting with a crowd of young male admirers from her dormitory window. Her return home ended Fitzgerald's weekly courtship.

Despite the great distance separating them, Fitzgerald still attempted to pursue Ginevra, and he traveled across the country to visit her family's Lake Forest estate. Although Ginevra loved him, her upper-class family belittled Scott's courtship because of his lower-class status compared to her other wealthy suitors. Her imperious father Charles Garfield King purportedly told a young Fitzgerald that "poor boys shouldn't think of marrying rich girls."

Rejected by Ginevra as an unsuitable match, a suicidal Fitzgerald enlisted in the United States Army amid World War I and received a commission as a second lieutenant. While awaiting deployment to the Western front where he hoped to die in combat, he was stationed in a training camp at Fort Leavenworth under the command of Captain Dwight D. Eisenhower, the future general of the Army and President of the United States. Fitzgerald purportedly chafed under Eisenhower's authority and disliked him intensely. Hoping to have a novel published before his anticipated death in Europe, Fitzgerald hastily wrote a 120,000-word manuscript entitled The Romantic Egotist in three months. When he submitted the manuscript to publishers, Scribner's rejected it, although the impressed reviewer, Max Perkins, praised Fitzgerald's writing and encouraged him to resubmit it after further revisions.

=== Army service and Zelda Sayre ===
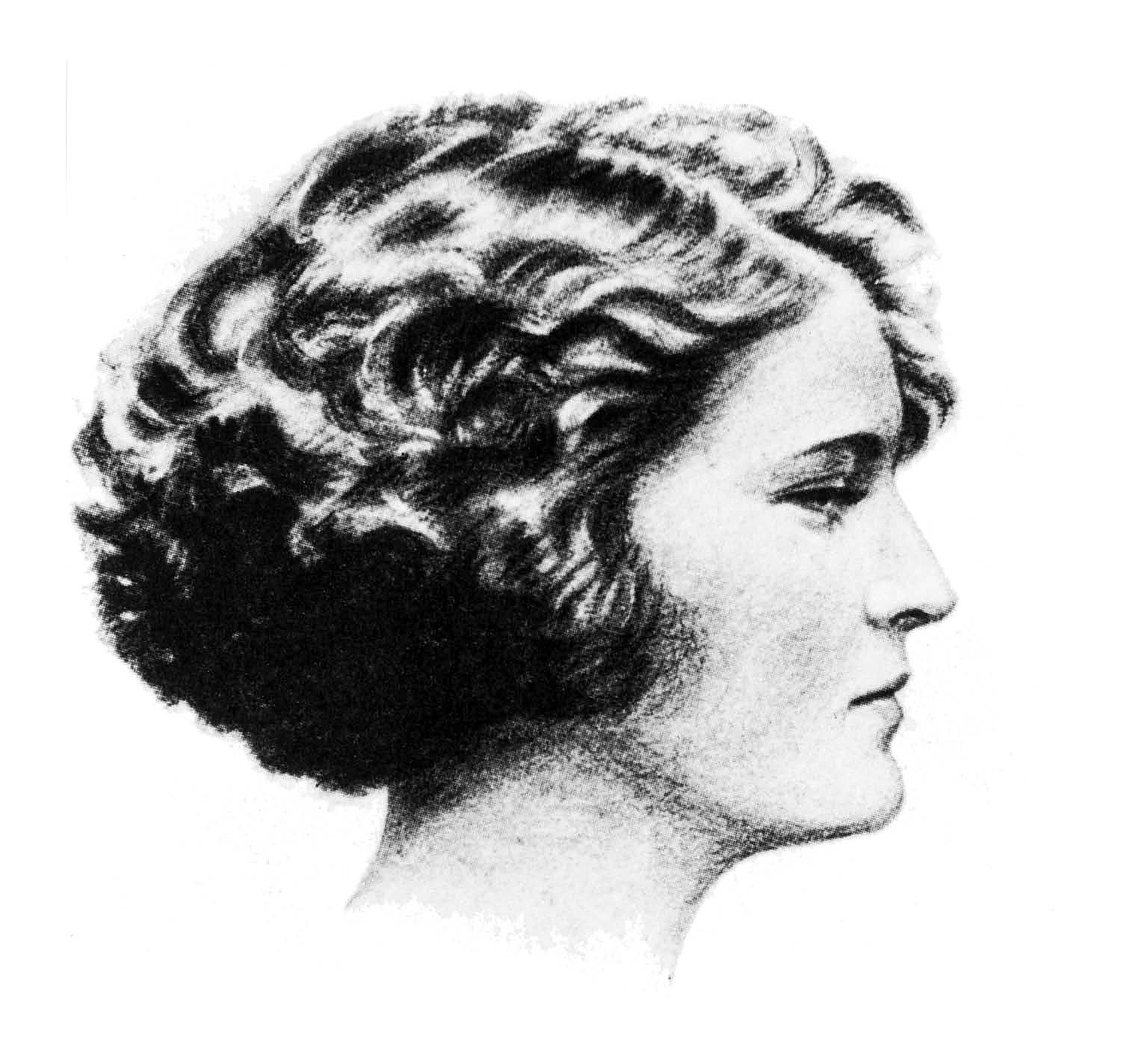
A sketch of Zelda Sayre by artist Gordon Bryant published in Metropolitan Magazine

In June 1918, Fitzgerald was garrisoned with the 45th and 67th Infantry Regiments at Camp Sheridan near Montgomery, Alabama. Attempting to rebound from his rejection by Ginevra, a lonely Fitzgerald began dating a variety of young Montgomery women. At a country club, Fitzgerald met Zelda Sayre, a 17-year-old Southern belle and the affluent granddaughter of a Confederate senator whose extended family owned the first White House of the Confederacy. (Note: Zelda's grandfather, Willis B. Machen, served in the Confederate Congress. Her father's uncle was John Tyler Morgan, a Confederate general in the American Civil War and a Grand Dragon of the Ku Klux Klan in Alabama. According to biographer Nancy Milford, "if there was a Confederate establishment in the Deep South, Zelda Sayre came from the heart of it.") Zelda was one of the most celebrated debutantes of Montgomery's exclusive country club set. A romance soon blossomed, although he continued writing Ginevra, asking in vain if there was any chance of resuming their former relationship. Three days after Ginevra married a wealthy Chicago businessman, Fitzgerald professed his affections for Zelda in September 1918.

Fitzgerald's Montgomery sojourn was interrupted briefly in November 1918 when he was transferred northward to Camp Mills, Long Island. While he was stationed there, the Allied Powers signed an armistice with Germany, and the war ended. Dispatched back to the base near Montgomery to await discharge, he renewed his pursuit of Zelda. Together, Scott and Zelda engaged in what he later described as sexual recklessness, and by December 1918, they had consummated their relationship. (Note: Both F. Scott Fitzgerald and Zelda Sayre had other sexual partners prior to their first meeting and courtship.) Although Fitzgerald did not initially intend to marry Zelda, the couple gradually viewed themselves as informally engaged, although Zelda declined to marry him until he proved financially successful.

Upon his discharge on February 14, 1919, he moved to New York City, where he unsuccessfully begged the editors of various newspapers for a job. He then turned to writing advertising copy to sustain himself while seeking a breakthrough as an author of fiction. Fitzgerald wrote to Zelda frequently, and by March 1919, he had sent Zelda his mother's ring, and the two became officially engaged. Several of Fitzgerald's friends opposed the match, as they deemed Zelda ill-suited for him. Likewise, Zelda's Episcopalian family was wary of Scott because of his Catholic background, precarious finances, and excessive drinking.

Seeking his fortune in New York, Fitzgerald worked for the Barron Collier advertising agency and lived in a single room in Manhattan's West Side. Although he received a small raise for creating a catchy slogan, "We keep you clean in Muscatine", for an Iowa laundry, Fitzgerald subsisted in relative poverty. Still aspiring to a lucrative career in literature, he wrote several short stories and satires in his spare time. Rejected over 120 times, he sold only one story, "Babes in the Woods", and received a pittance of $30.

=== Struggles and literary breakthrough ===
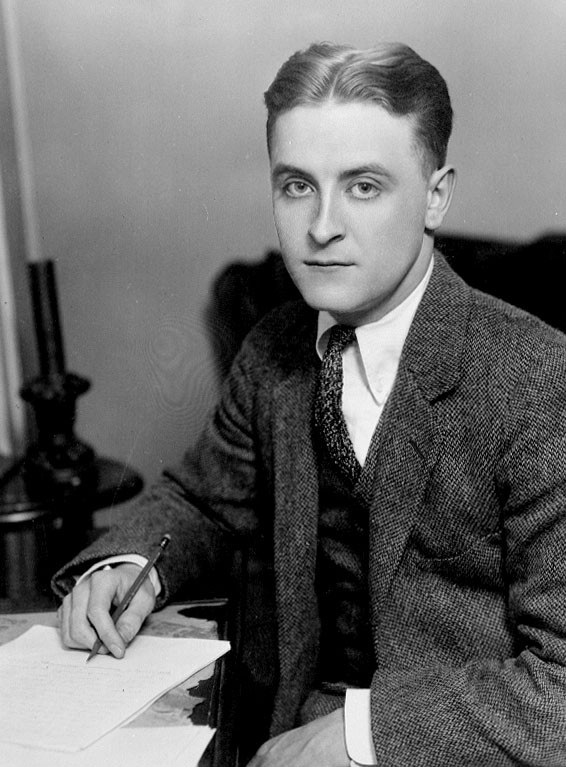
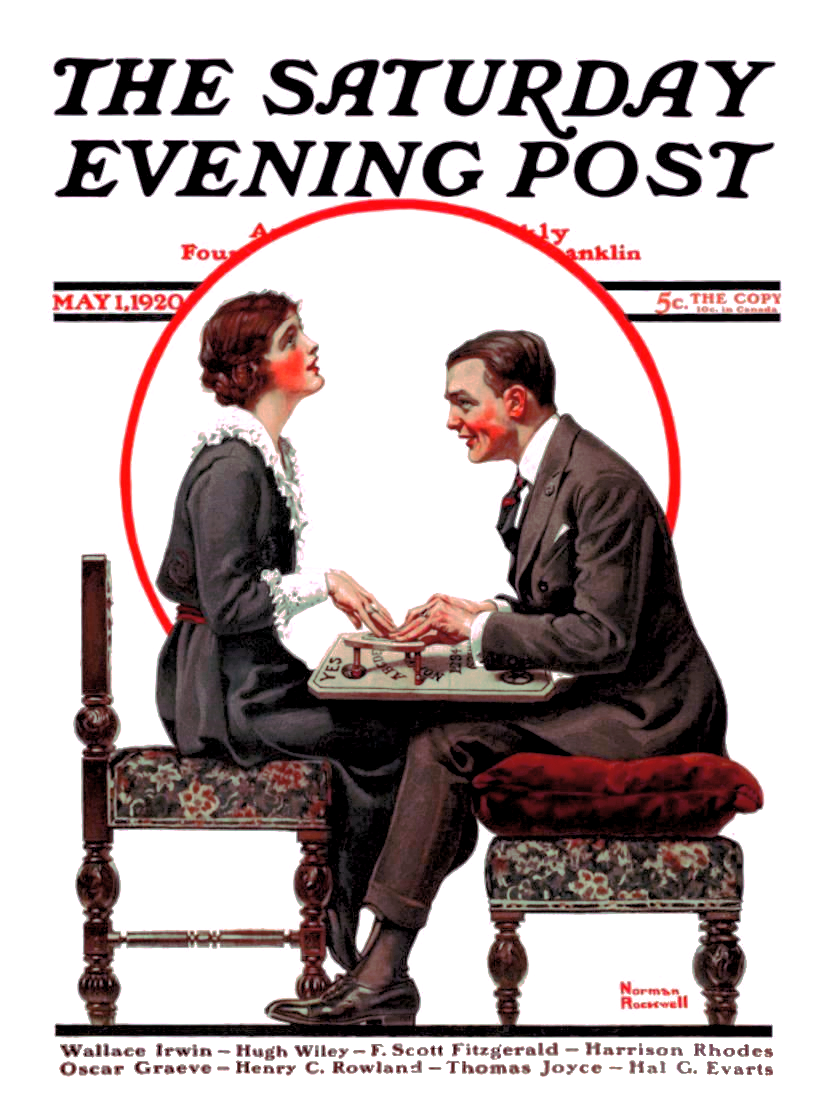
Fitzgerald at his desk circa 1920. His debut novel, This Side of Paradise, became a cultural sensation in the United States. Soon after, The Saturday Evening Post published his short story "Bernice Bobs Her Hair" (right).

With dreams of a lucrative career in New York City dashed, Fitzgerald could not convince Zelda that he would be able to support her, and she broke off the engagement in June 1919. In the wake of Fitzgerald's rejection by Ginevra two years prior, his subsequent rejection by Zelda dispirited him. While Prohibition-era New York City was experiencing the burgeoning Jazz Age, Fitzgerald felt defeated and rudderless: two women had rejected him in succession, he detested his advertising job, his stories failed to sell, he could not afford new clothes, and his future seemed bleak. Unable to earn a successful living, Fitzgerald publicly threatened to jump to his death from a window ledge of the Yale Club, (Note: According to biographer Andrew Turnbull, "one day, drinking martinis in the upstairs lounge, [Fitzgerald] announced that he was going to jump out of the window. No one objected; on the contrary, it was pointed out that the windows were French and ideally suited for jumping, which seemed to cool his ardor.") and he carried a revolver daily while contemplating suicide.

In July, Fitzgerald quit his advertising job and returned to St. Paul. Having returned to his hometown as a failure, Fitzgerald became a social recluse and lived on the top floor of his parents' home at 599 Summit Avenue, on Cathedral Hill. He decided to make one last attempt to become a novelist and to stake everything on the success or failure of a book. Abstaining from alcohol and parties, he worked day and night to revise The Romantic Egotist as This Side of Paradise—an autobiographical account of his Princeton years and his romances with Ginevra, Zelda, and others.

While revising his novel, Fitzgerald took a job repairing train car roofs at the Northern Pacific Shops in St. Paul. One evening in the fall of 1919, after an exhausted Fitzgerald had returned home from work, the postman rang and delivered a telegram from Scribner's announcing that his revised manuscript had been accepted for publication. Upon reading the telegram, an ecstatic Fitzgerald ran down the streets of St. Paul and flagged down random automobiles to share the news.

Fitzgerald's debut novel appeared in bookstores on March 26, 1920, and became an instant success. This Side of Paradise sold approximately 40,000 copies in the first year. Within months of its publication, his debut novel became a cultural sensation in the United States, and F. Scott Fitzgerald became a household name. Critics such as H. L. Mencken hailed the work as the best American novel of the year, and newspaper columnists described the work as the first realistic American college novel. The work catapulted Fitzgerald's career as a writer. Magazines now accepted his previously rejected stories, and The Saturday Evening Post published his story "Bernice Bobs Her Hair" with his name on its May 1920 cover.

Fitzgerald's new fame enabled him to earn much higher rates for his short stories, and Zelda resumed their engagement as Fitzgerald could now pay for her accustomed lifestyle. (Note: During her youth, Zelda Sayre's wealthy Southern family employed half-a-dozen domestic servants, many of whom were African-American. Consequently, she was unaccustomed to menial labor or responsibilities of any kind.) Although they were re-engaged, Fitzgerald's feelings for Zelda were at an all-time low, and he remarked to a friend, "I wouldn't care if she died, but I couldn't stand to have anybody else marry her." Despite mutual reservations, they married in a simple ceremony on April 3, 1920, at St. Patrick's Cathedral, New York. At the time of their wedding, Fitzgerald claimed neither of them still loved the other, and the early years of their marriage were more akin to a friendship.

=== New York City and the Jazz Age ===
It was an age of miracles, it was an age of art, it was an age of excess, and it was an age of satire.

— F. Scott Fitzgerald in "Echoes of the Jazz Age" (1931)

Living in luxury at the Biltmore Hotel in New York City, the newlywed couple became national celebrities, as much for their wild behavior as for the success of Fitzgerald's novel. At the Biltmore, Scott did handstands in the lobby, while Zelda slid down the hotel banisters. After several weeks, the hotel asked them to leave for disturbing other guests. The couple relocated two blocks to the Commodore Hotel on 42nd Street where they spent half an hour spinning in the revolving door. Fitzgerald likened their juvenile behavior in New York City to two "small children in a great bright unexplored barn." Writer Dorothy Parker first encountered the couple riding on the roof of a taxi. "They did both look as though they had just stepped out of the sun", Parker recalled, "their youth was striking. Everyone wanted to meet him."

As Fitzgerald was one of the most celebrated novelists during the Jazz Age, many admirers sought his acquaintanceship. He met sports columnist Ring Lardner, journalist Rebecca West, cartoonist Rube Goldberg, actress Laurette Taylor, actor Lew Fields, comedian Ed Wynn, and many others. He became close friends with critics George Jean Nathan and H. L. Mencken, the influential co-editors of The Smart Set magazine who led an ongoing cultural war against puritanism in American arts. At the peak of his commercial success and cultural salience, Fitzgerald recalled traveling in a taxi one afternoon in New York City and weeping when he realized that he would never be as happy again.

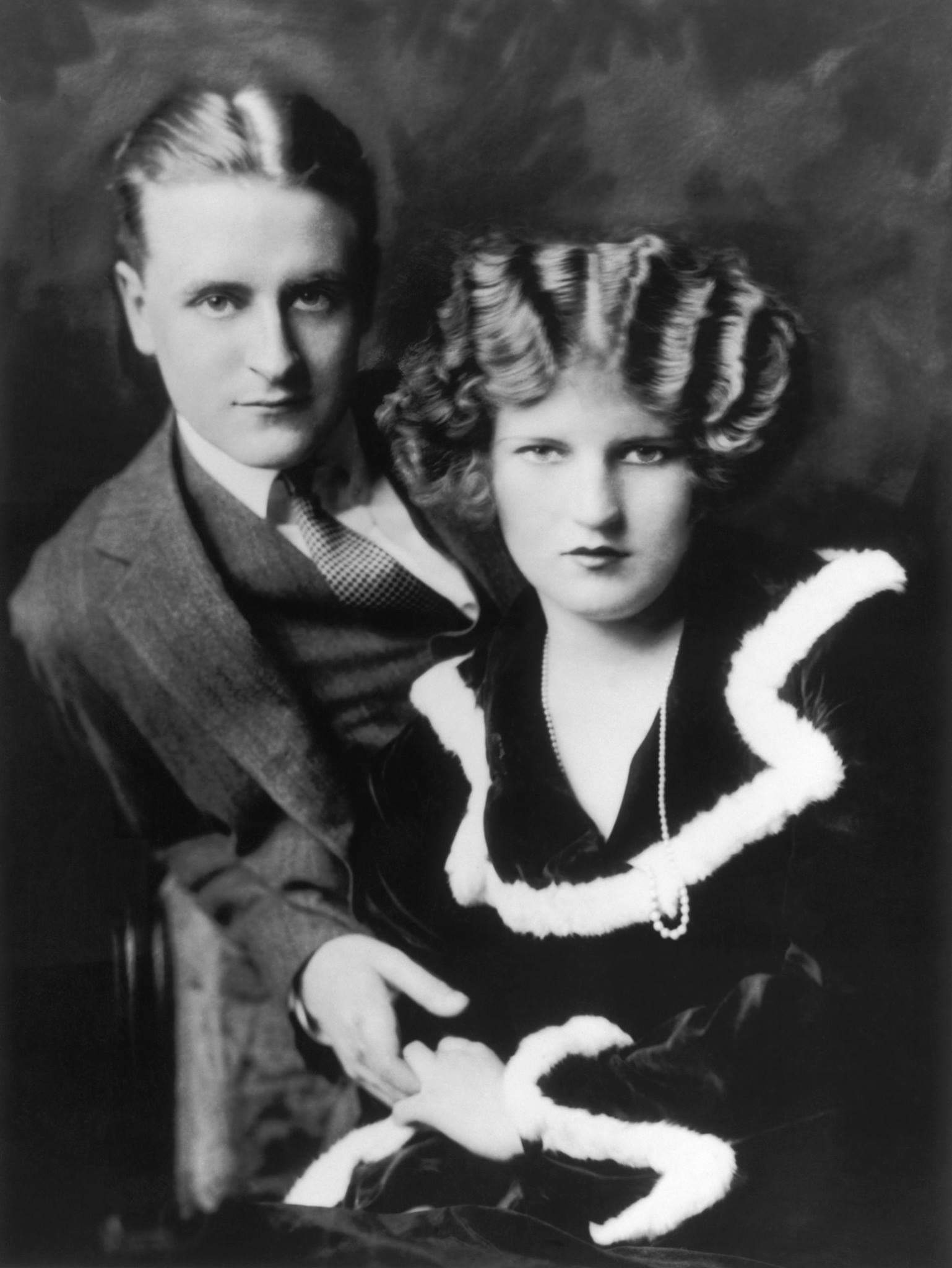
Portrait of Scott and Zelda by Alfred Cheney Johnston, 1923

Fitzgerald's ephemeral happiness mirrored the societal giddiness of the Jazz Age, a term which he popularized in his essays and stories. He described the era as racing "along under its own power, served by great filling stations full of money." In Fitzgerald's eyes, the era represented a morally permissive time when Americans became disillusioned with prevailing social norms and obsessed with self-gratification.

During this hedonistic era, alcohol increasingly fueled the Fitzgeralds' social life, and the couple consumed gin-and-fruit concoctions at every outing. Publicly, their alcohol intake meant little more than napping at parties, but privately it led to bitter quarrels.

As their quarrels worsened, the couple accused each other of marital infidelities. They remarked to friends that their marriage would not last much longer. After their eviction from the Commodore Hotel in May 1920, the couple spent the summer in a cottage in Westport, Connecticut, near Long Island Sound.

In Winter 1921, his wife became pregnant as Fitzgerald worked on his second novel, The Beautiful and Damned, and the couple traveled to his home in St. Paul, Minnesota, to have the child. On October 26, 1921, Zelda gave birth to their daughter and only child Frances Scott "Scottie" Fitzgerald. As she emerged from the anesthesia, he recorded Zelda saying, "Oh, God, goofo [sic] I'm drunk. Mark Twain. Isn't she smart—she has the hiccups. I hope it's beautiful and a fool—a beautiful little fool." Fitzgerald later used some of her rambling almost verbatim for Daisy Buchanan's dialogue in The Great Gatsby.

=== Long Island and second novel ===
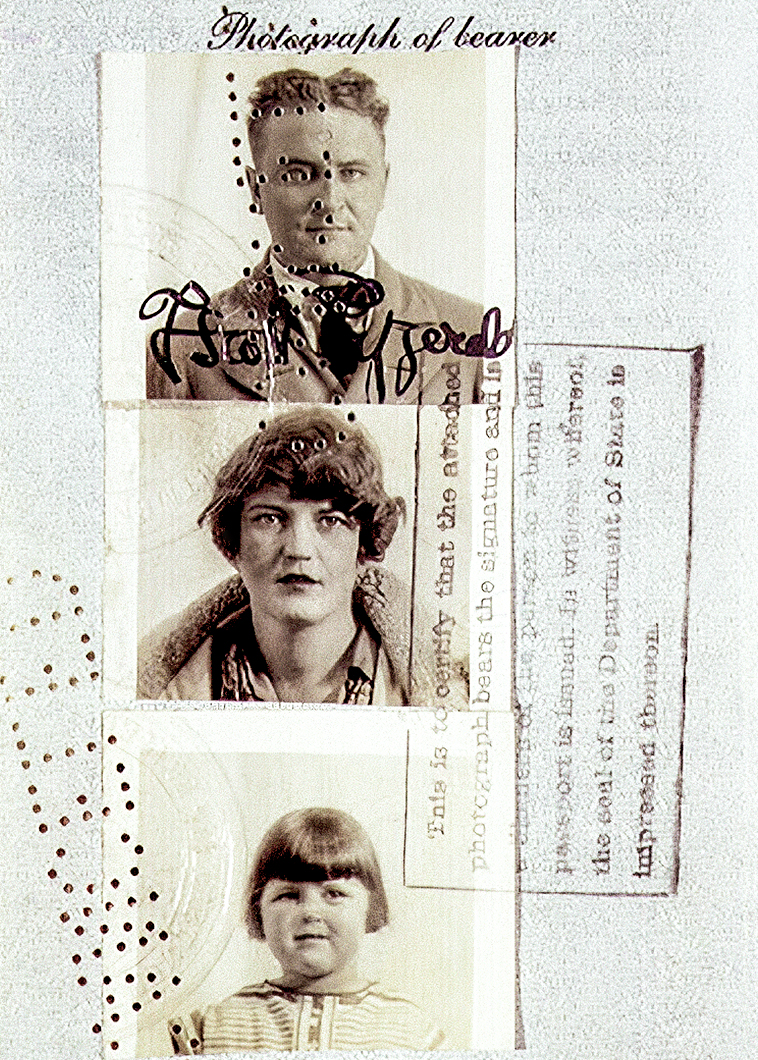
Passport photos of the Fitzgeralds, 1923

After his daughter's birth, Fitzgerald returned to drafting The Beautiful and Damned. The novel's plot follows a young artist and his wife who become dissipated and bankrupt while partying in New York City. He modeled the characters of Anthony Patch on himself and Gloria Patch on—in his words—the chill-mindedness and selfishness of Zelda. Metropolitan Magazine serialized the manuscript in late 1921, and Scribner's published the book in March 1922. Scribner's prepared an initial print run of 20,000 copies. It sold well enough to warrant additional print runs reaching 50,000 copies. That year, Fitzgerald released an anthology of eleven stories entitled Tales of the Jazz Age. He had written all but two of the stories before 1920.

Following Fitzgerald's adaptation of his story "The Vegetable" into a play, in October 1922, he and Zelda moved to Great Neck, Long Island, to be near Broadway. Although he hoped The Vegetable would inaugurate a lucrative career as a playwright, the play's November 1923 premiere was an unmitigated disaster. The bored audience walked out during the second act. Fitzgerald wished to halt the show and disavow the production. During an intermission, Fitzgerald asked lead actor Ernest Truex if he planned to finish the performance. When Truex replied in the affirmative, Fitzgerald fled to the nearest bar. Mired in debt by the play's failure, Fitzgerald wrote short stories to restore his finances. Fitzgerald viewed his stories as worthless except for "Winter Dreams", which he described as his first attempt at the Gatsby idea. When not writing, Fitzgerald and his wife continued to socialize and drink at Long Island parties.

Despite enjoying the Long Island milieu, Fitzgerald disapproved of the extravagant parties, and the wealthy people he encountered often disappointed him. While admiring the wealth and striving to emulate the lifestyles of the rich, he simultaneously found their privileged behavior morally disquieting, and possessed "the smoldering resentment of a peasant" towards them. While the couple were living on Long Island, one of Fitzgerald's wealthier neighbors was Max Gerlach. Purportedly born in America to a German immigrant family, Gerlach had been a major in the American Expeditionary Forces during World War I and became a gentleman bootlegger who lived like a millionaire in New York. Flaunting his new wealth, Gerlach threw lavish parties, never wore the same shirt twice, used the phrase "old sport", and fostered myths about himself, including that he was a relation of the German Kaiser. These details would inspire Fitzgerald in creating his next work, The Great Gatsby.

=== Europe and The Great Gatsby ===
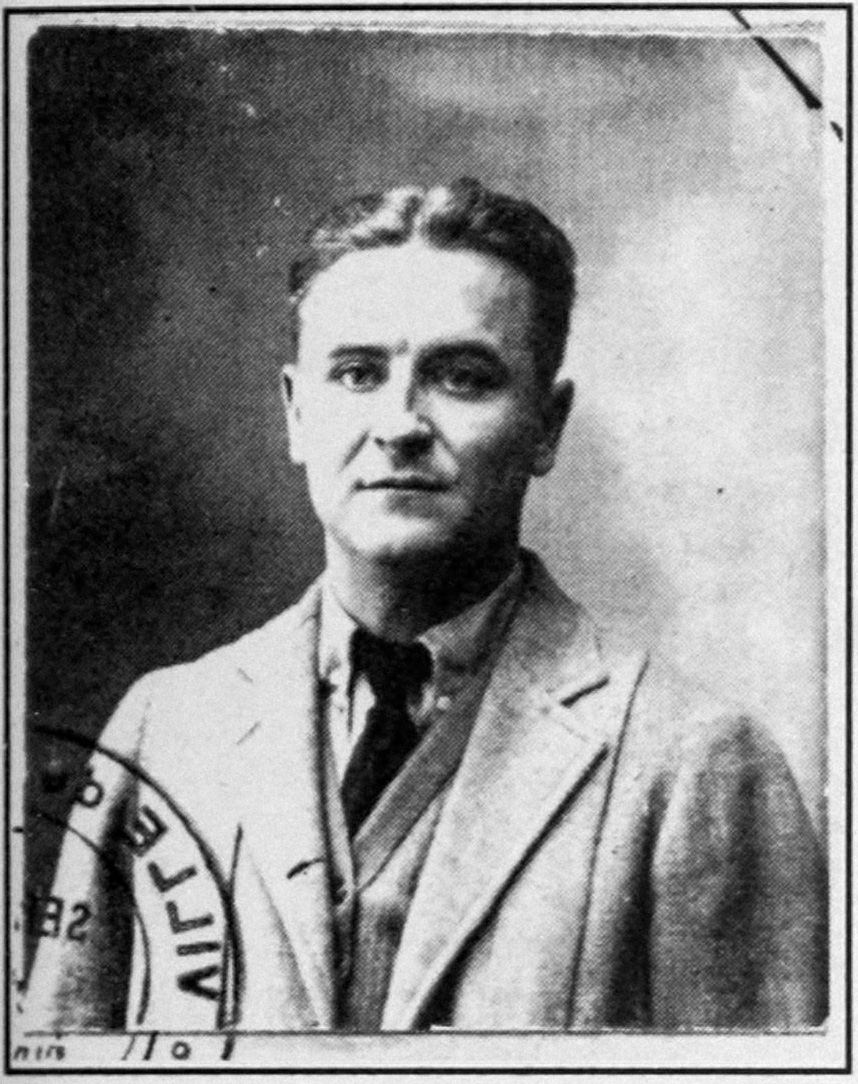
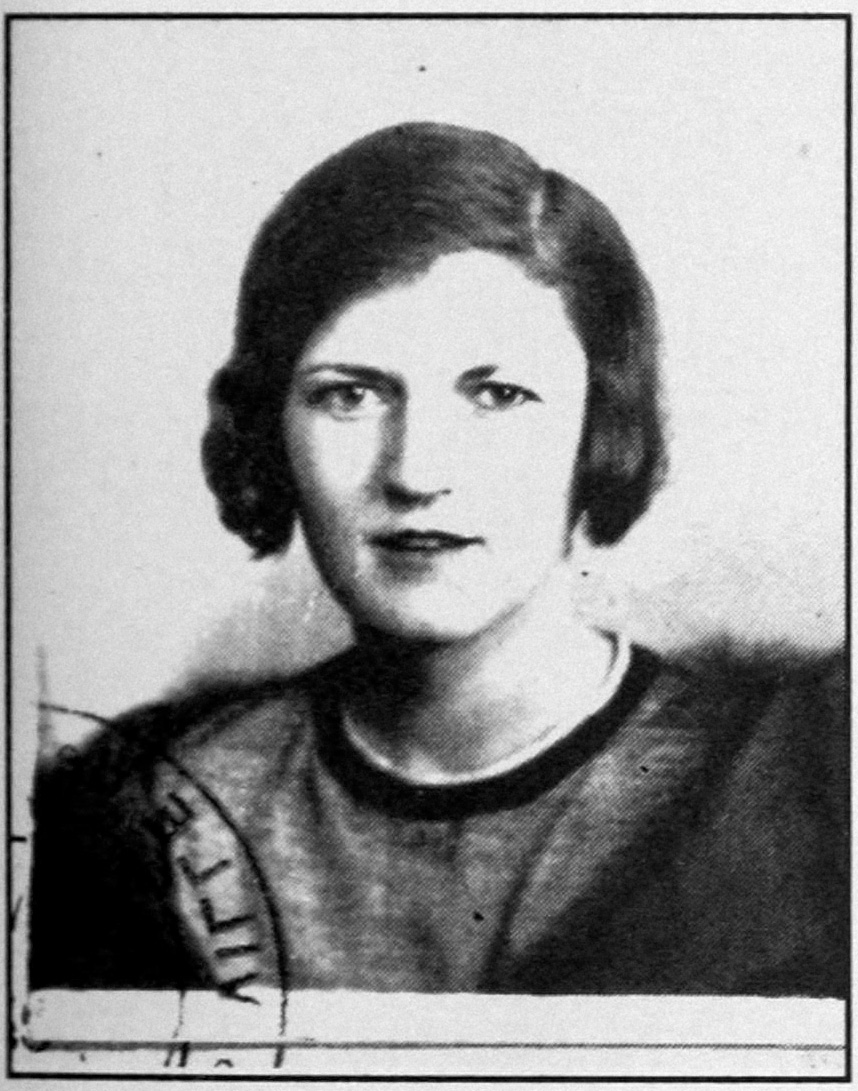
Fitzgeralds' French identity card photos, 1929. While abroad in Europe, Fitzgerald wrote and published The Great Gatsby (1925).

In May 1924, Fitzgerald and his family moved abroad to Europe. He continued writing his third novel, which would eventually become his magnum opus The Great Gatsby. Fitzgerald had been planning the novel since 1923, when he told his publisher Maxwell Perkins of his plans to embark upon a work of art that would be beautiful and intricately patterned. He had already written 18,000 words for his novel by mid-1923 but discarded most of his new story as a false start. Initially titled Trimalchio—an allusion to the Latin work Satyricon—the plot followed the rise of a parvenu who seeks wealth to win the woman he loves. For source material, Fitzgerald drew heavily on his experiences on Long Island and once again on his lifelong obsession with his first love Ginevra King. "The whole idea of Gatsby", he later explained, "is the unfairness of a poor young man not being able to marry a girl with money. This theme comes up again and again because I lived it."

Work on The Great Gatsby slowed while the Fitzgeralds sojourned on the French Riviera, where a marital crisis developed. Zelda became infatuated with a French naval aviator, Édouard Jozan. She spent afternoons swimming at the beach and evenings dancing at the casinos with him. After six weeks, Zelda asked for a divorce. Fitzgerald sought to confront Jozan and locked Zelda in their house until he could do so. Before any confrontation could occur, Jozan—who had no intention of marrying Zelda—left the Riviera, and the Fitzgeralds never saw him again. Soon after, Zelda overdosed on sleeping pills. The couple never spoke of the incident, but the episode led to a permanent breach in their marriage. Jozan later dismissed the entire incident and claimed no infidelity or romance had occurred: "They both had a need of drama, they made it up and perhaps they were the victims of their own unsettled and a little unhealthy imagination."

Following this incident, the Fitzgeralds relocated to Rome. On December 1, 1924, Fitzgerald was in a drunken brawl that ended in a Rome police station, there he punched an officer and was severely beaten by others. In Rome, he made revisions to the Gatsby manuscript throughout the winter and submitted the final version in February 1925. Fitzgerald declined a $10,000 offer for the serial rights, as it would delay the book's publication. Upon its release on April 10, 1925, Willa Cather, T. S. Eliot, and Edith Wharton praised Fitzgerald's work, and the novel received generally favorable reviews from contemporary literary critics. Despite this reception, Gatsby became a commercial failure compared to his previous efforts, This Side of Paradise (1920) and The Beautiful and Damned (1922). By the end of the year, the book had sold fewer than 23,000 copies. For the rest of his life, The Great Gatsby experienced tepid sales. (Note: In 1929, Fitzgerald's domestic royalties for The Great Gatsby amounted to $5.10. A final royalty check amounted to $13.13, all of which was from Fitzgerald buying his own books. Although Gatsby experienced tepid book sales, Fitzgerald sold the film rights for $15,000 to $12,000.) It would take decades for the novel to gain its present acclaim and popularity, thanks also to the popular dust-jacket art, named Celestial Eyes.

=== Hemingway and the Lost Generation ===
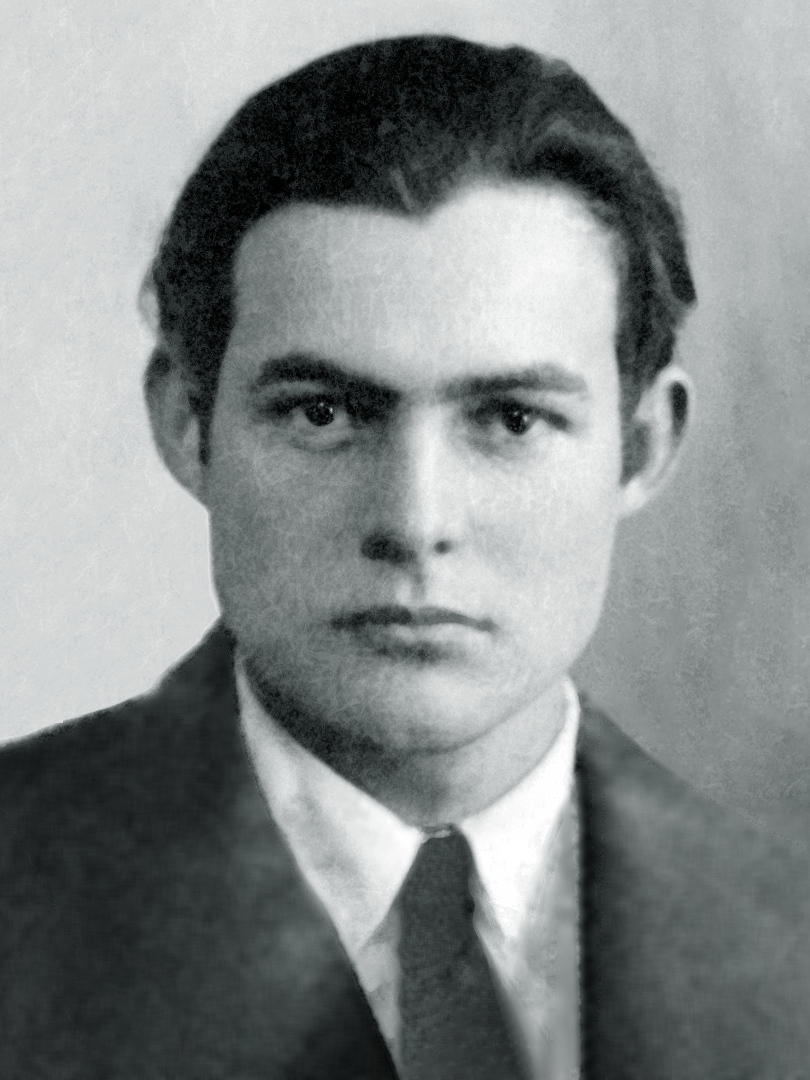
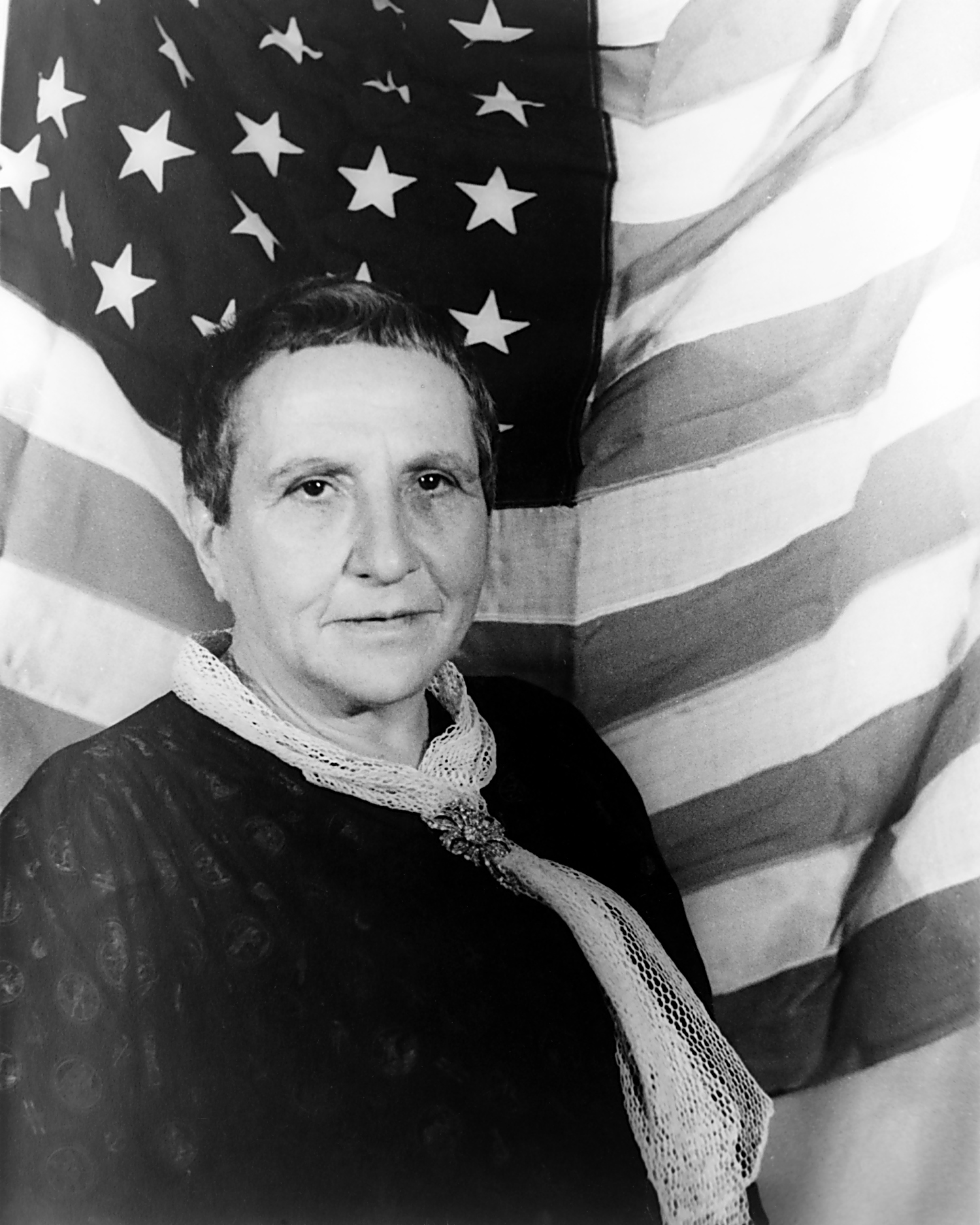
In France, Fitzgerald became close friends with writers Ernest Hemingway and Gertrude Stein.

After wintering in Italy, the Fitzgeralds returned to France, where they alternated between Paris and the French Riviera until 1926. During this period, he became friends with writer Gertrude Stein, bookseller Sylvia Beach, novelist James Joyce, poet Ezra Pound and other members of the American expatriate community in Paris, some of whom would later be identified with the Lost Generation. Most notable among them was a then relatively unknown Ernest Hemingway, whom Fitzgerald first met in May 1925 and grew to admire. Hemingway later recalled that, during this early period of their relationship, Fitzgerald became his most loyal friend.

In contrast to his friendship with Scott, Hemingway disliked Zelda and described her as "insane" in his memoir, A Moveable Feast. Hemingway claimed that Zelda preferred her husband to write lucrative short stories as opposed to novels in order to support her accustomed lifestyle. "I always felt a story in the [Saturday Evening] Post was tops", Zelda later recalled, "But Scott couldn't stand to write them." To supplement their income, Fitzgerald often wrote stories for magazines such as The Saturday Evening Post, Collier's Weekly, and Esquire. He would first write his stories in an 'authentic' manner, then rewrite them to add plot twists which increased their salability as magazine stories. This "whoring", as Hemingway called these sales, emerged as a sore point in their friendship. After reading The Great Gatsby, an impressed Hemingway vowed to put any differences with Fitzgerald aside and to aid him in any way he could, although he feared Zelda would derail Fitzgerald's writing career.

Hemingway alleged that Zelda sought to destroy her husband, and she purportedly taunted Fitzgerald over his penis size. After examining it in a public restroom, Hemingway confirmed Fitzgerald's penis to be of average size. Both Fitzgerald's mistress Sheilah Graham and acquaintance Arnold Gingrich, "who once saw Fitzgerald with his bathrobe open," likewise attested his genitalia to be average. A more serious rift soon occurred when Zelda belittled Fitzgerald with homophobic slurs and accused him of engaging in a homosexual relationship with Hemingway. At the time, Fitzgerald had written in his private notebook about Hemingway: "I really loved him, but of course it wore out like a love affair." Fitzgerald decided to have sex with a prostitute to prove his heterosexuality. Zelda found condoms he had purchased before any encounter occurred, and a bitter quarrel ensued, resulting in lingering jealousy. Soon after, Zelda threw herself down a flight of marble stairs at a party because Fitzgerald, engrossed in talking to Isadora Duncan, ignored her. In December 1926, after two unpleasant years in Europe which considerably strained their marriage, the Fitzgeralds returned to America.

=== Sojourn in Hollywood and Lois Moran ===
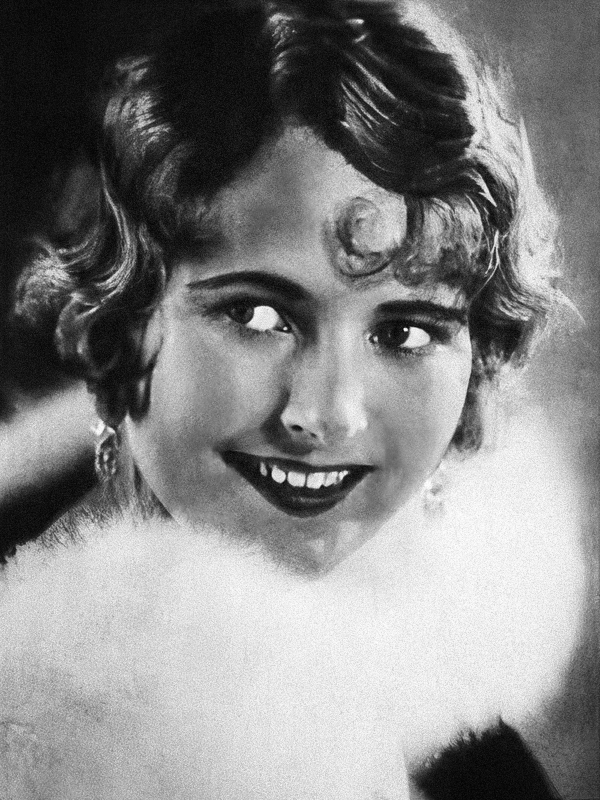
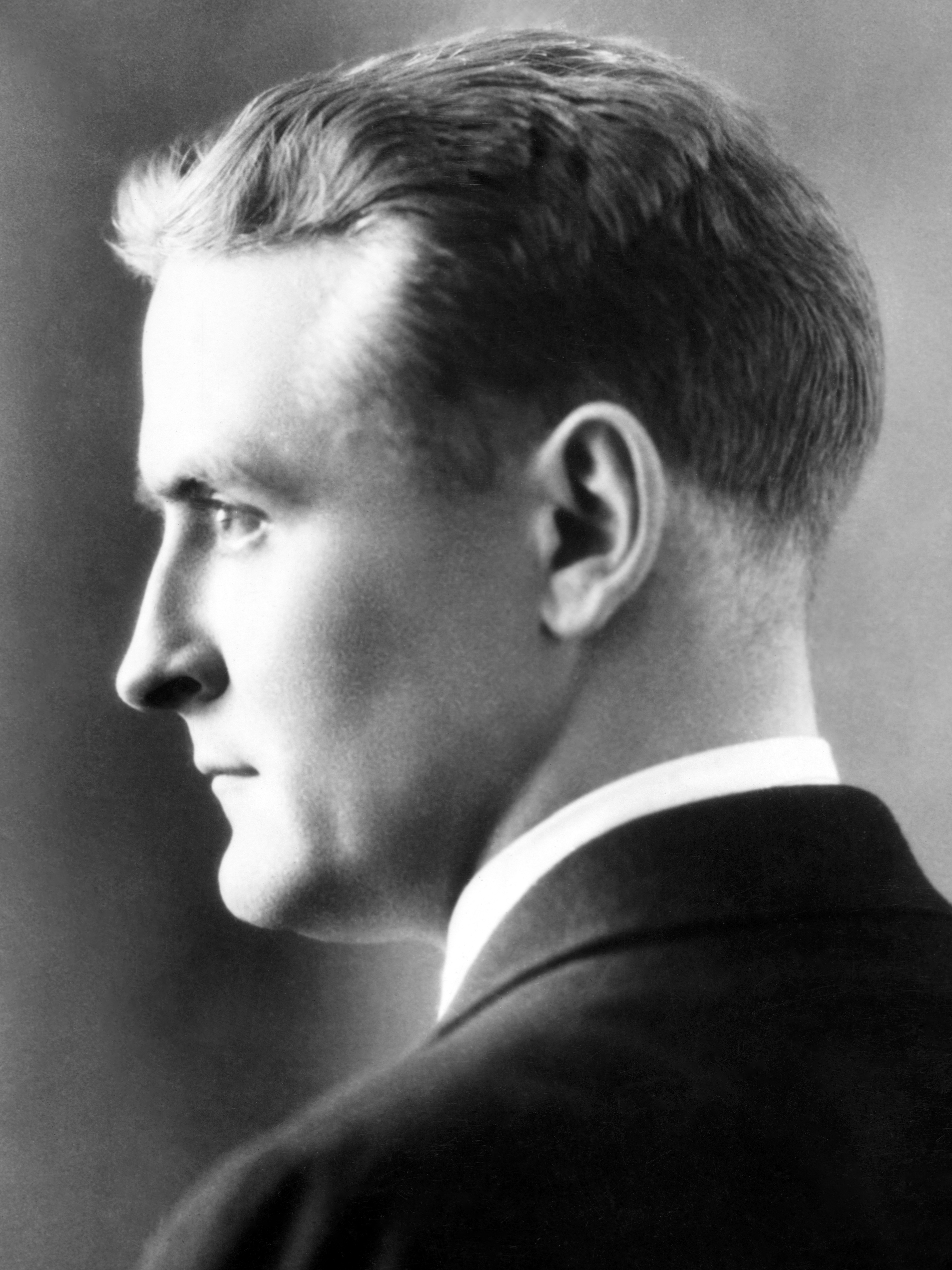
Fitzgerald's relations with actress Lois Moran in 1927 further strained his relationship with Zelda.

In 1926, film producer John W. Considine Jr. invited Fitzgerald to Hollywood during its golden age to write a flapper comedy for United Artists. He agreed and moved into a studio-owned bungalow with Zelda in January 1927. In Hollywood, the Fitzgeralds attended parties where they danced the black bottom and mingled with film stars. At one party they outraged guests Ronald Colman and Constance Talmadge by a prank: They requested their watches and, retreating into the kitchen, boiled the expensive timepieces in a pot of tomato sauce. The Hollywood life's novelty quickly faded for the Fitzgeralds, and Zelda frequently complained of boredom.

While attending a lavish party at the Pickfair estate, Fitzgerald met 17-year-old Lois Moran, a starlet who had gained widespread fame for her role in Stella Dallas (1925). Desperate for intellectual conversation, Moran and Fitzgerald discussed literature and philosophy for hours while sitting on a staircase. Fitzgerald was 31 years old and past his prime, but the smitten Moran regarded him as a sophisticated, handsome, and gifted writer. Consequently, she pursued a relationship with him. The starlet became a muse for the author, and he wrote her into a short story called "Magnetism", in which a young Hollywood film starlet causes a married writer to waver in his sexual devotion to his wife. Fitzgerald later rewrote Rosemary Hoyt—one of the central characters in Tender is the Night—to mirror Moran.

Jealous of Fitzgerald and Moran, an irate Zelda set fire to her own expensive clothing in a bathtub as a self-destructive act. She disparaged the teenage Moran as "a breakfast food that many men identified with whatever they missed from life." Fitzgerald's relations with Moran further exacerbated the Fitzgeralds' marital difficulties and, after merely two months in Jazz Age Hollywood, the unhappy couple departed for Delaware in March 1927.

=== Zelda's illness and final novel ===
The Fitzgeralds rented "Ellerslie", a mansion near Wilmington, Delaware until 1929. Fitzgerald returned to his fourth novel but proved unable to make any progress due to his alcoholism and poor work ethic. In Spring 1929, the couple returned to Europe. That winter, Zelda's behavior grew increasingly erratic and violent. During an automobile trip to Paris along the mountainous roads of the Grande Corniche, Zelda seized the car's steering wheel and tried to kill herself along with Fitzgerald and their nine-year-old daughter by driving over a cliff. Following this homicidal incident, doctors diagnosed Zelda with schizophrenia in June 1930. The couple traveled to Switzerland, where she underwent treatment at a clinic. They returned to America in September 1931. In February 1932, she underwent hospitalization at the Phipps Clinic at Johns Hopkins University in Baltimore, Maryland.

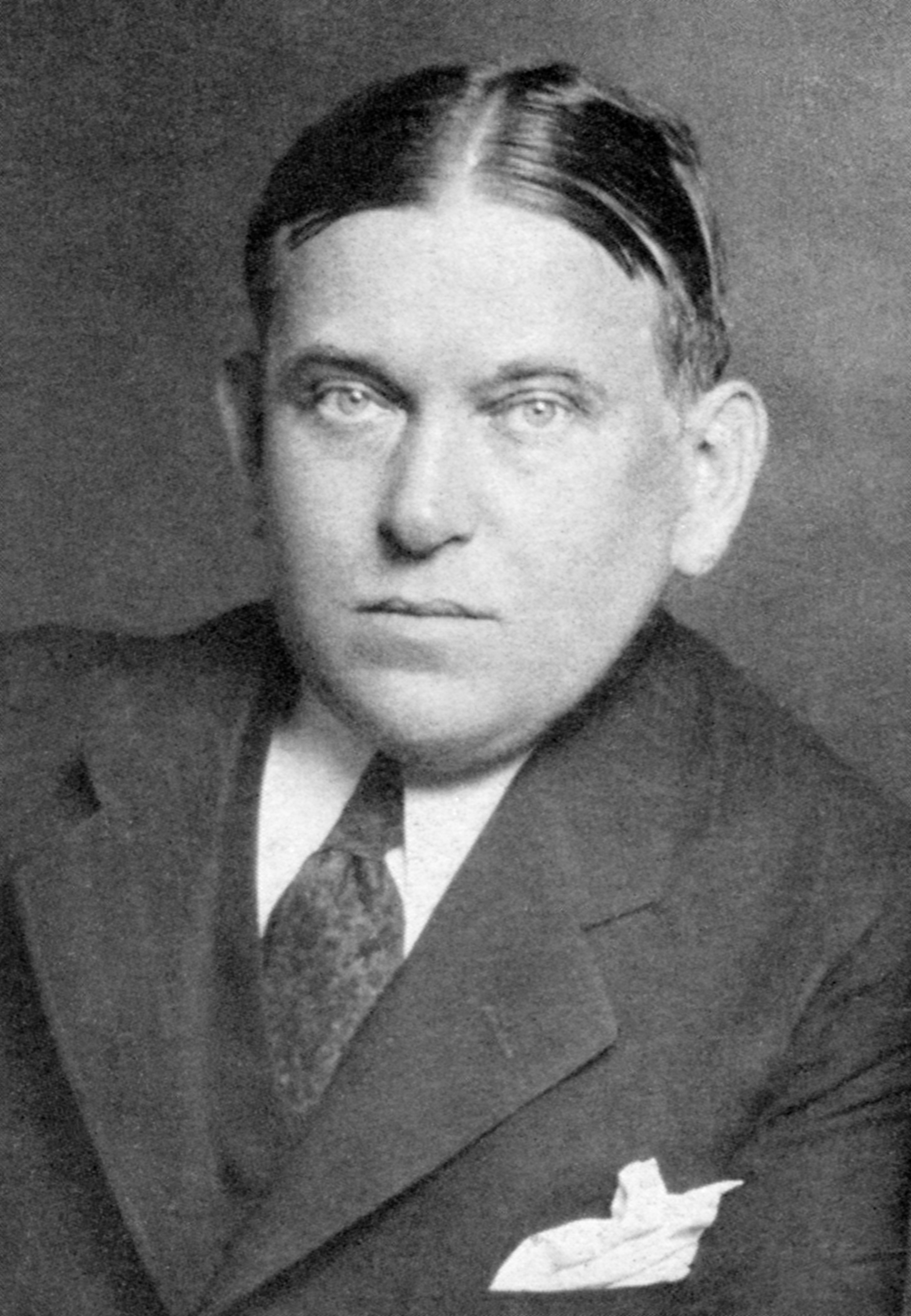
H. L. Mencken believed that Fitzgerald's career as a novelist was in jeopardy because of his wife's mental illness.

In April 1932, when the psychiatric clinic allowed Zelda to travel with her husband, Fitzgerald took her to lunch with critic H. L. Mencken, by then the literary editor of The American Mercury. In his private diary, Mencken noted Zelda "went insane in Paris a year or so ago, and is still plainly more or less off her base." Throughout the luncheon, she manifested signs of mental distress. A year later, when Mencken met Zelda for the last time, he described her mental illness as immediately evident to any onlooker and her mind as "only half sane." He regretted Fitzgerald could not write novels, as he had to write magazine stories to pay for Zelda's psychiatric treatment.

During this time, Fitzgerald rented the "La Paix" estate in the suburb of Towson, Maryland, and worked on his next novel, which drew heavily on recent experiences. The story concerned a promising young American named Dick Diver who marries a mentally ill young woman; their marriage deteriorates while they are abroad in Europe. While Fitzgerald labored on his novel, Zelda wrote—and sent to Scribner's—her own fictionalized version of these same autobiographical events in Save Me the Waltz (1932). Piqued by what he saw as theft of his novel's plot material, Fitzgerald would later describe Zelda as a plagiarist and a third-rate writer. (Note: Fitzgerald objected to Zelda naming her heroine's husband Amory Blaine, the name of the protagonist in This Side of Paradise.) Despite his annoyance, he insisted upon few revisions to the work, (Note: Contrary to Nancy Milford's 1970 biography Zelda, scholarly examinations of Zelda's earlier drafts of Save Me the Waltz and the final version discerned fewer alterations than previously claimed. According to Matthew J. Bruccoli, the revised galleys were "in Zelda Fitzgerald's hand. F. Scott Fitzgerald did not systematically work on the surviving proofs: only eight of the words written on them are clearly in his hand.") and he persuaded Perkins to publish Zelda's novel. Scribner's published Zelda's novel in October 1932, but it was a commercial and critical failure.

Fitzgerald's own novel debuted in April 1934 as Tender Is the Night and received mixed reviews. Its structure threw off many critics who felt Fitzgerald had not lived up to their expectations. Hemingway and others argued that such criticism stemmed from superficial readings of the material and from Depression-era America's reaction to Fitzgerald's status as a symbol of Jazz Age excess. The novel did not sell well upon publication, with approximately 12,000 sold in the first three months, but, like The Great Gatsby, the book's reputation has since grown significantly.

=== Great Depression and decline ===
[Fitzgerald's] talent was as natural as the pattern that was made by the dust on a butterfly's wings. At one time he understood it no more than the butterfly did and he did not know when it was brushed or marred. Later he became conscious of his damaged wings and of their construction and he learned to think and could not fly any more because the love of flight was gone and he could only remember when it had been effortless.

— Ernest Hemingway on Fitzgerald's loss of talent in A Moveable Feast (1964)

Amid the Great Depression, Fitzgerald's works were deemed elitist and materialistic. In 1933, journalist Matthew Josephson criticized Fitzgerald's short stories saying that many Americans could no longer afford to drink champagne whenever they pleased or to go on vacation to Montparnasse in Paris. As writer Budd Schulberg recalled, "my generation thought of F. Scott Fitzgerald as an age rather than a writer, and when the economic stroke of 1929 began to change the sheiks (Note: A "sheik" referred to young men in the Jazz Age who imitated the appearance and dress of iconic film star Rudolph Valentino. The female equivalent of a "sheik" was called a "sheba". Both "sheiks" and "shebas" were older in age than the younger "flapper" generation who were children during World War I.) and flappers into unemployed boys or underpaid girls, we consciously and a little belligerently turned our backs on Fitzgerald."

With his popularity decreased, Fitzgerald began to suffer financially and, by 1936, his book royalties amounted to $80. The cost of his opulent lifestyle and Zelda's medical bills quickly caught up, placing him in constant debt. He relied on loans from his agent, Harold Ober, and publisher Perkins. When Ober ceased advancing money, an ashamed Fitzgerald severed ties with his agent believing Ober had lost faith in him due to his alcoholism.

As he had been an alcoholic for many years, (Note: In a letter, Fitzgerald insisted he only became an alcoholic after college. He wrote that he had never been "drunk at Princeton—or in the army, except one night when I retired to the locker room.") Fitzgerald's heavy drinking undermined his health by the late 1930s. His alcoholism resulted in cardiomyopathy, coronary artery disease, angina, dyspnea, and syncopal spells. In addition to these alcohol-related ailments, Fitzgerald suffered from recurring tuberculosis (TB) throughout his life. He had a mild attack of TB in 1919, a tubercular hemorrhage in 1929, and required hospitalization for active TB in 1939 after a conclusive sputum culture test. During the last decade of his life, as his health deteriorated, Fitzgerald had told Hemingway of his fear of dying from congested lungs.

Fitzgerald's deteriorating health, chronic alcoholism, and financial woes made for difficult years in Baltimore. His friend H. L. Mencken wrote in a June 1934 diary entry that "the case of F. Scott Fitzgerald has become distressing. He is boozing in a wild manner and has become a nuisance. His wife, Zelda, who has been insane for years, is now confined at the Sheppard-Pratt Hospital, and he is living in Park Avenue with his little daughter, Scottie". By 1935, alcoholism disrupted Fitzgerald's writing and limited his mental acuity. From 1933 to 1937, he was hospitalized for alcoholism eight times. In September 1936, journalist Michel Mok of the New York Post publicly reported Fitzgerald's alcoholism and career failure in a nationally syndicated article. The article damaged Fitzgerald's reputation and prompted him to attempt suicide after reading it.

By that same year, Zelda's intense suicidal mania necessitated her extended confinement at the Highland Hospital in Asheville, North Carolina. Nearly bankrupt, Fitzgerald spent most of 1936 and 1937 living in cheap hotels near Asheville. His attempts to write and sell more short stories faltered. He later referred to this period of decline in his life as "The Crack-Up" in a short story. The sudden death of Fitzgerald's mother and Zelda's mental deterioration led to his marriage further disintegrating. He saw Zelda for the last time on a 1939 trip to Cuba. During this trip, spectators at a cockfight beat Fitzgerald when he tried to intervene against animal cruelty. He returned to the United States and—his ill health exacerbated by excessive drinking—underwent hospitalization at the Doctors Hospital in Manhattan.

=== Return to Hollywood ===
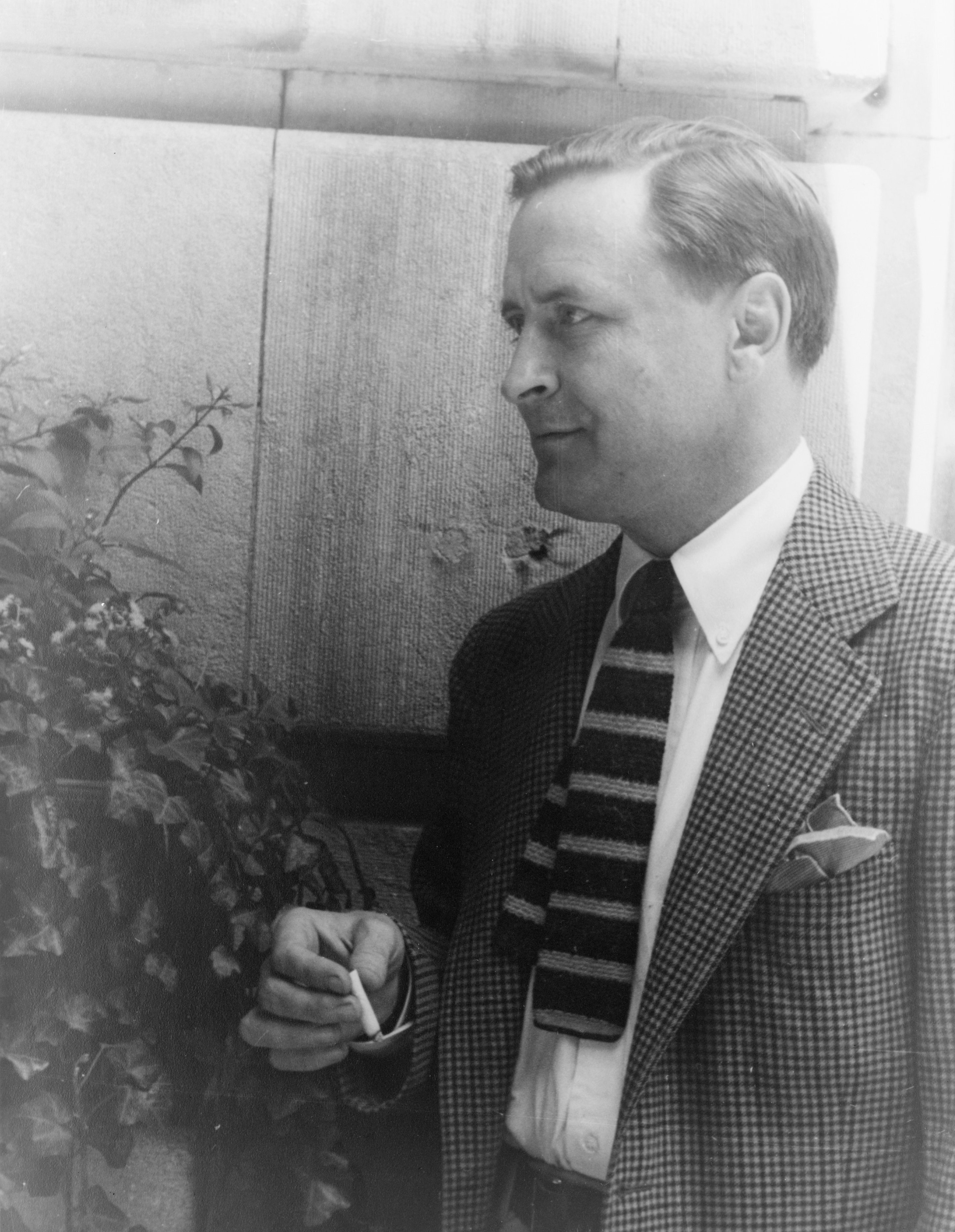
A middle-aged Fitzgerald in 1937, three years before his death

Fitzgerald's dire financial straits compelled him to accept a lucrative contract as a screenwriter with Metro-Goldwyn-Mayer (MGM) in 1937 that necessitated his relocation to Hollywood. Despite earning his highest annual income up to that point ($29,757.87, equivalent to $666,452 in 2025), Fitzgerald spent the bulk of his income on Zelda's psychiatric treatment and his daughter Scottie's school expenses. During the next two years, Fitzgerald rented a cheap room at the Garden of Allah bungalow on Sunset Boulevard. In an effort to abstain from alcohol, Fitzgerald drank large amounts of Coca-Cola and ate many sweets.

Estranged from Zelda, Fitzgerald attempted to reunite with his first love Ginevra King when the wealthy Chicago heiress visited Hollywood in 1938. "She was the first girl I ever loved and I have faithfully avoided seeing her up to this moment to keep the illusion perfect," Fitzgerald informed his daughter Scottie, shortly before the planned meeting. The reunion proved a disaster due to Fitzgerald's uncontrollable alcoholism, and a disappointed Ginevra returned east to Chicago.

Soon after, a lonely Fitzgerald began a relationship with nationally syndicated gossip columnist Sheilah Graham, his final companion before his death. Graham recalled that when they first danced in July 1937, “It is hard to put into words how Scott Fitzgerald worked this magic,” but he made her feel that to dance with her was the most extraordinary privilege for him, by his words and the rapt attention he gave to everything she said; she wrote that he appreciated her mind as well as her face. After having a heart attack at Schwab's Pharmacy, Fitzgerald was advised by his doctor to avoid strenuous exertion. Fitzgerald had to climb two flights of stairs to his apartment, while Graham lived on the ground floor. Consequently, he moved in with Graham, who lived in Hollywood on North Hayworth Avenue, one block east of Fitzgerald's apartment on North Laurel Avenue.

Throughout their relationship, Graham claimed Fitzgerald felt constant guilt over Zelda's mental illness and confinement. He repeatedly attempted sobriety, had depression, had violent outbursts, and attempted suicide. On occasions that Fitzgerald failed his attempt at sobriety, (Note: According to Graham, Fitzgerald "had begun drinking, as a young man, because in those days everyone drank. 'Zelda and I drank with them. I was able to drink and enjoy it. I thought all I needed anywhere in the world to make a living was a pencil and paper. Then I found I needed liquor too. I needed it to write.'") he would ask strangers, "I'm F. Scott Fitzgerald. You've read my books. You've read The Great Gatsby, haven't you? Remember?" As Graham had read none of his works, Fitzgerald attempted to buy her a set of his novels. After visiting several bookstores, he realized they had stopped carrying his works. The realization that he was largely forgotten as an author further depressed him.

During this last phase of his career, Fitzgerald's screenwriting tasks included uncredited work on A Yank at Oxford, revisions on Madame Curie (1943) and an unused dialogue polish for Gone with the Wind (1939)—a book which Fitzgerald disparaged as unoriginal and an "old wives' tale". Both of the later assignments also went uncredited. His work on Three Comrades (1938) became his sole screenplay credit. To the studio's annoyance, Fitzgerald ignored scriptwriting rules and included descriptions more fitting for a novel. In his spare time, he worked on his fifth novel, The Last Tycoon, (Note: Scribner's later reissued the book under Fitzgerald's preferred title, The Love of The Last Tycoon.) based on film executive Irving Thalberg. In 1939, MGM terminated his contract, and Fitzgerald became a freelance screenwriter. During his work on Winter Carnival (1939), Fitzgerald had an alcoholic relapse and sought treatment by New York psychiatrist Richard Hoffmann.

Director Billy Wilder described Fitzgerald's foray into Hollywood as like that of "a great sculptor who is hired to do a plumbing job". Edmund Wilson and Aaron Latham suggested Hollywood sucked Fitzgerald's creativity like a vampire. His failure in Hollywood pushed him to return to drinking, and he drank nearly 40 beers a day in 1939. Beginning that year, Fitzgerald mocked himself as a Hollywood hack through the character of Pat Hobby in a sequence of 17 short stories. Esquire originally published The Pat Hobby Stories between January 1940 and July 1941. Approaching the final year of his life, Fitzgerald wrote regretfully to his daughter: "I wish now I'd never relaxed or looked back—but said at the end of The Great Gatsby: I've found my line—from now on this comes first. This is my immediate duty—without this I am nothing."

=== Final year and death ===
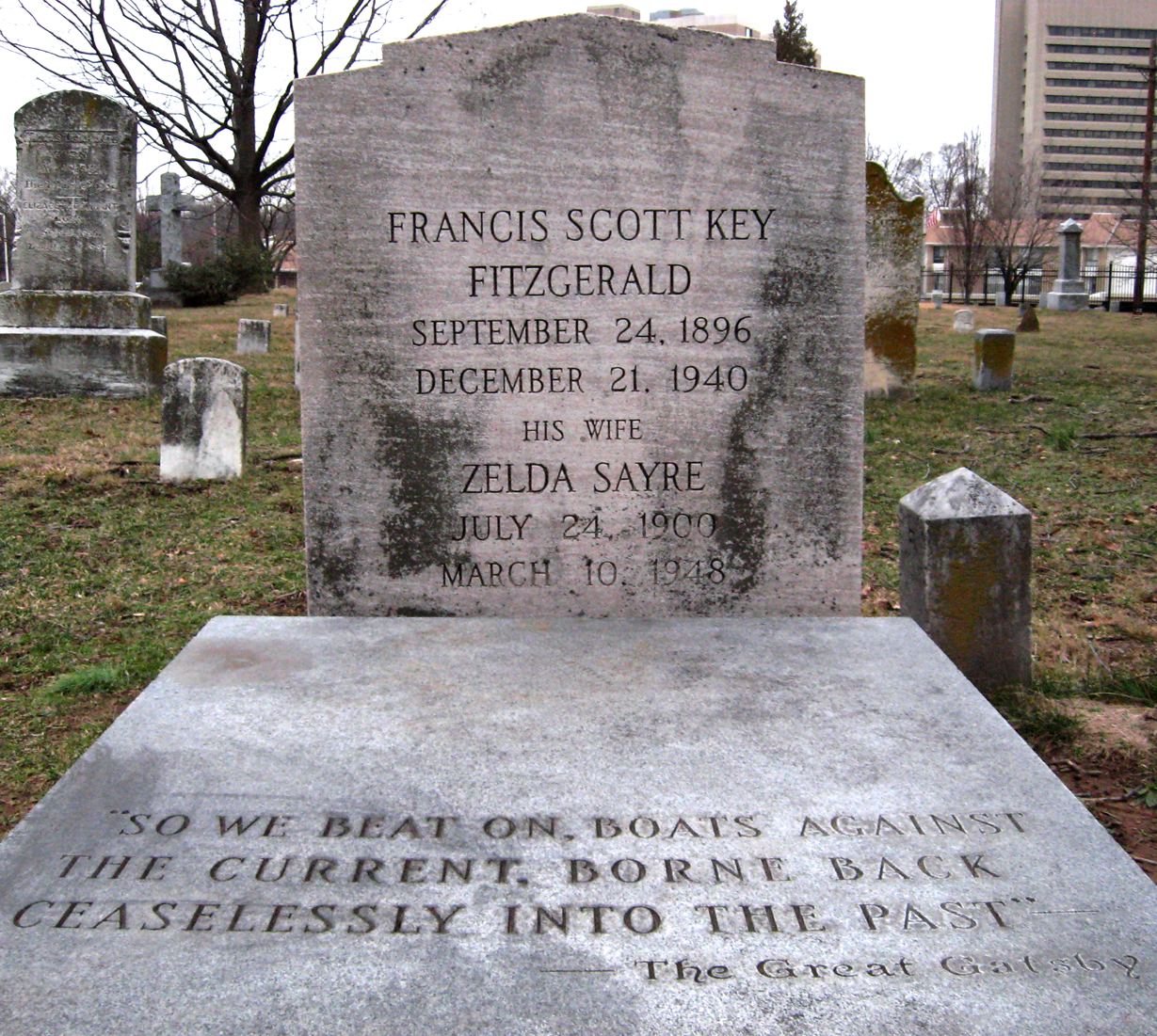
The Fitzgeralds' grave at St. Mary's in Maryland, inscribed with the final sentence of The Great Gatsby

Fitzgerald achieved sobriety over a year before his death, and Graham described their last year together as one of the happiest times of their relationship. On the night of December 20, 1940, Fitzgerald and Graham attended the premiere of This Thing Called Love. As the couple left the Pantages Theatre, a sober Fitzgerald experienced a dizzy spell and had difficulty walking to his vehicle. Watched by onlookers, he remarked in a strained voice to Graham, "I suppose people will think I'm drunk."

The following day, as Fitzgerald annotated his newly arrived Princeton Alumni Weekly, Graham saw him jump from his armchair, grab the mantelpiece, and collapse on the floor without uttering a sound. Lying flat on his back, he gasped and lapsed into unconsciousness. After failed efforts to revive him, Graham ran to fetch Harry Culver, the building's manager. Upon entering the apartment, Culver stated, "I'm afraid he's dead." Fitzgerald died of a heart attack due to occlusive coronary arteriosclerosis at 44 years old.

On learning of her father's death, Scottie telephoned Graham from Vassar and asked she not attend the funeral for social propriety. In Graham's place, her friend Dorothy Parker attended the visitation held in the back room of an undertaker's parlor. Observing few other people at the visitation, Parker murmured "the poor son of a bitch"—a line from Jay Gatsby's funeral in The Great Gatsby. When Fitzgerald's poorly embalmed corpse arrived in Bethesda, Maryland, only thirty people attended his funeral. (Note: Frances Kroll Ring wrote regarding Fitzgerald's corpse: "The figure in the grey box had no connection with the Scott I knew. The moritician's cosmetics defacted him and he looked like a badly painted portrait, waxed, spiritless".) Among the attendees were his only child, Scottie, his agent Harold Ober, and his lifelong editor Maxwell Perkins.

Zelda eulogized Fitzgerald in a letter to a friend: "He was as spiritually generous a soul as ever was... It seems as if he was always planning happiness for Scottie and for me. Books to read—places to go. Life seemed so promising always when he was around. ... Scott was the best friend a person could have to me". At the time of his death, the Roman Catholic Church denied the family's request that Fitzgerald, a non-practicing Catholic, be buried in the family plot in the Catholic Saint Mary's Cemetery in Rockville, Maryland. Fitzgerald was buried instead with a simple Protestant service at Rockville Cemetery. When Zelda died in a fire at the Highland Hospital in 1948, she was buried next to him in Rockville Cemetery. In 1975, Scottie successfully petitioned to have the earlier decision revisited, and her parents' remains were moved to the family plot in Saint Mary's.

=== Critical reevaluation ===
It has been the greatest credo in my life that I would rather be an artist than a careerist. I would rather impress my image upon the soul of a people.... I would as soon be as anonymous as Rimbaud if I could feel that I had accomplished that purpose.

— F. Scott Fitzgerald in a letter to H. L. Mencken, 1934

At the time of his death, Fitzgerald believed that his life was a failure and his work was forgotten. The few critics who were familiar with his work regarded him as a failed alcoholic—the embodiment of Jazz Age decadence. In an obituary in The Nation magazine, Margaret Marshall dismissed Fitzgerald as a Jazz Age scribe "who did not fulfill his early promise—his was a fair-weather talent which was not adequate to the stormy age into which it happened, ironically, to emerge." His New York Times obituary deemed his work forever tied to an era "when gin was the national drink and sex the national obsession". In retrospective reviews that followed after his death, literary critics such as Peter Quennell dismissed his magnum opus The Great Gatsby as merely a nostalgic period piece with "the sadness and the remote jauntiness of a Gershwin tune".

Surveying these posthumous attacks, John Dos Passos opined that many literary critics in popular newspapers lacked the basic discernment about the art of writing. "The strange thing about the articles that came out about Fitzgerald's death," Dos Passos later recalled, "was that the writers seemed to feel that they didn't need to read his books; all they needed for a license to shovel them into the ashcan was to label them as having been written in such and such a period now past."

Within one year after his death, Edmund Wilson completed Fitzgerald's unfinished fifth novel The Last Tycoon using the author's extensive notes, and he included The Great Gatsby within the edition, sparking new interest and discussion among critics. Amid World War II, The Great Gatsby gained further popularity when the Council on Books in Wartime distributed free Armed Services Edition copies to American soldiers serving overseas. The Red Cross distributed the novel to prisoners in Japanese and German POW camps. By 1945, over 123,000 copies of The Great Gatsby had been distributed among U.S. troops. By 1960—thirty-five years after the novel's original publication—the book was selling 100,000 copies per year. This renewed interest led The New York Times editorialist Arthur Mizener to proclaim the novel a masterwork of American literature. In 1993, a new edition was published as The Love of the Last Tycoon, edited by Matthew J. Bruccoli.

By the 21st century, The Great Gatsby had sold millions of copies, and the novel is required reading in many high school and college classes. Despite its publication a century ago, the work continues to be cited by scholars as relevant to understanding contemporary America. According to Professor John Kuehl of New York University: "If you want to know about Spain, you read Hemingway's The Sun Also Rises. If you want to know about the South, you read Faulkner. If you want to know what America's like, you read The Great Gatsby. Fitzgerald is the quintessential American writer."

=== Posthumous renown ===
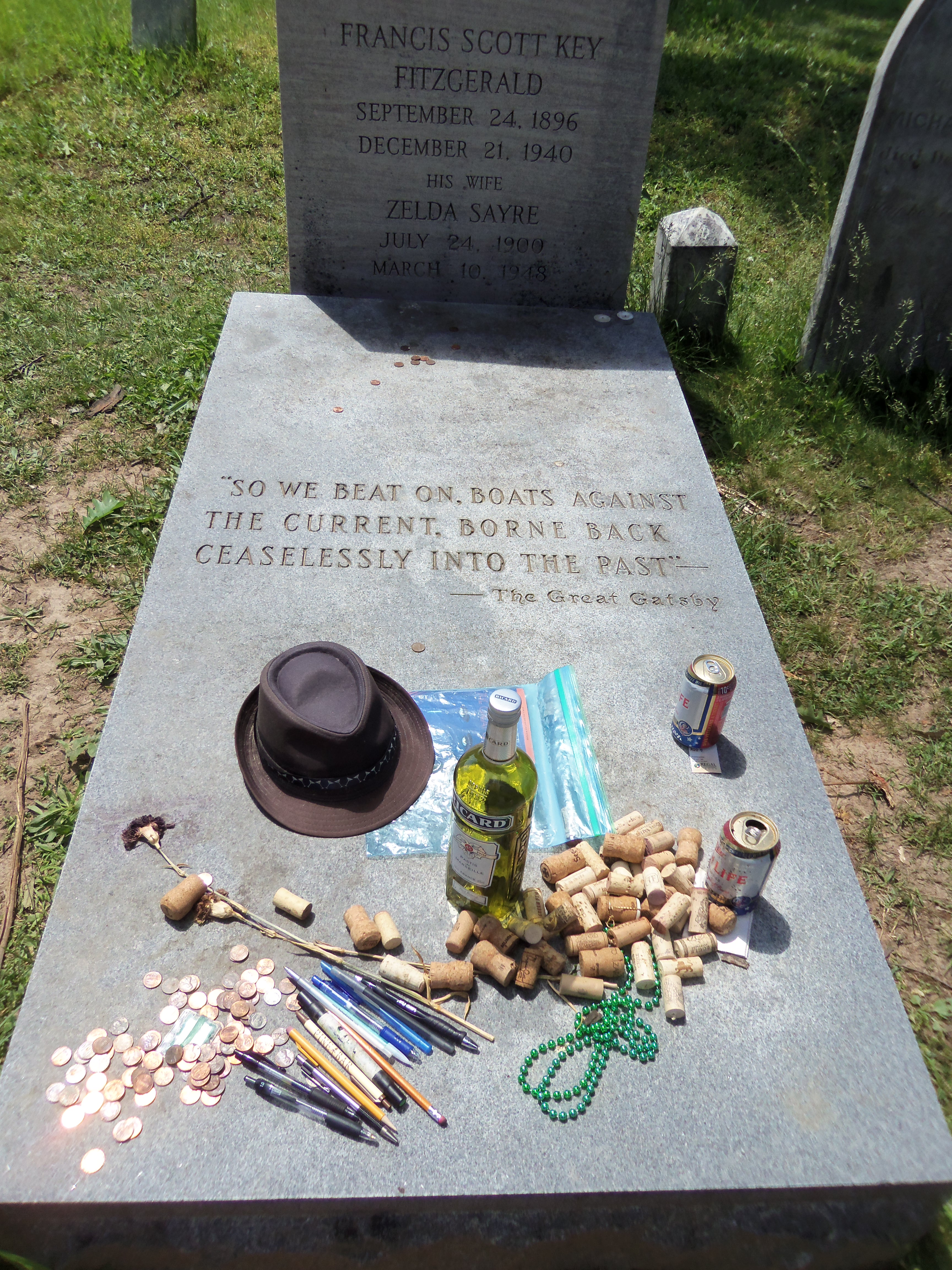
Admirers of Fitzgerald's work often deposit mementos at his gravesite.

The Great Gatsby's popularity led to widespread interest in Fitzgerald himself. By the 1950s, he had become a cult figure in American culture and was more widely known than at any period during his lifetime. In 1952, critic Cyril Connolly observed that "apart from his increasing stature as writer, Fitzgerald is now firmly established as a myth, an American version of the Dying God, an Adonis of letters" whose rise and fall inevitably prompts comparisons to the Jazz Age itself.

Seven years later, Fitzgerald's friend Edmund Wilson remarked that he now received copious letters from female admirers of Fitzgerald's works and that his flawed alcoholic friend had posthumously become "a semi-divine personage" in the popular imagination. Echoing these opinions, writer Adam Gopnik asserted that—contrary to Fitzgerald's claim that "there are no second acts in American lives"—Fitzgerald became "not a poignant footnote to an ill-named time but an enduring legend of the West".

Decades after his death, Fitzgerald's childhood Summit Terrace home in St. Paul became a National Historic Landmark in 1971. Fitzgerald detested the house and deemed it an architectural monstrosity. In 1990, Hofstra University established the F. Scott Fitzgerald Society, which later became an affiliate of the American Literature Association. During the COVID-19 pandemic, the society organized an online reading of This Side of Paradise to mark its centenary. In 1994, the World Theater in St. Paul—home of the radio broadcast of A Prairie Home Companion—was renamed the Fitzgerald Theater.

== Artistry ==
=== Literary evolution ===
==== Novels ====
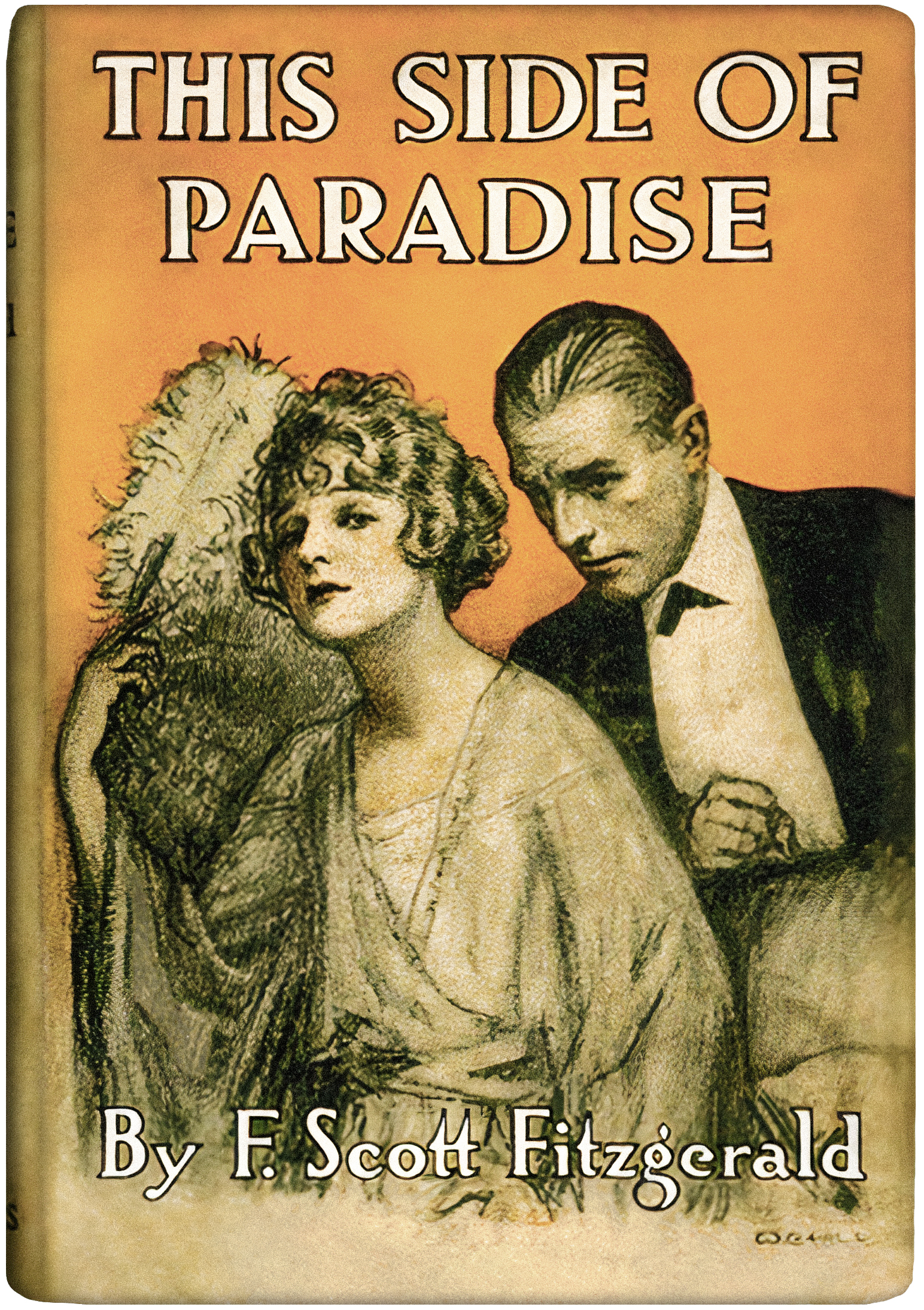
Critics praised This Side of Paradise (1920) for its experimental style but derided its form and construction.

More so than most contemporary writers of his era, F. Scott Fitzgerald's authorial voice evolved and matured over time, and his each successive novel represented a discernible progression in literary quality. Although his peers eventually hailed him as possessing "the best narrative gift of the century," this narrative gift was not perceived as immediately evident in his earliest writings. Believing that prose has a basis in lyric verse, Fitzgerald initially crafted his sentences entirely by ear and, consequently, his earliest efforts contained numerous malapropisms and descriptive non sequiturs which irritated both editors and readers. During these early attempts at writing fiction, he received over 122 rejection letters, and the publishing house Scribner's rejected his first novel three times despite extensive rewrites.

For his first novel, Fitzgerald used as his literary templates H. G. Wells' 1909 work Tono-Bungay and Sir Compton Mackenzie's 1913 novel Sinister Street, which chronicled a young college student's coming-of-age at Oxford University. Although Fitzgerald imitated the plot of Mackenzie's novel, his debut work differed remarkably due to its experimental style. He discarded the stodgy narrative technique of most novels and instead unspooled the plot in the form of textual fragments, letters, and poetry intermingled together. This atonal blend of different fictive elements prompted cultural elites to fête the young Fitzgerald as a literary trailblazer whose work modernized a staid literature that had lagged "as far behind modern habits as behind modern history." His work, they declared, pulsed with originality.

Although critics praised This Side of Paradise as highly original, they criticised its form and construction. They highlighted the fact that the work had "almost every fault and deficiency that a novel can possibly have," and a consensus soon emerged that Fitzgerald's prosemanship left much to be desired. He could write entertainingly, his detractors conceded, but he gave scant attention to form and construction. Having read and digested these criticisms of his debut novel, Fitzgerald sought to improve upon the form and construction of his prose in his next work and to venture into a new genre of fiction altogether.

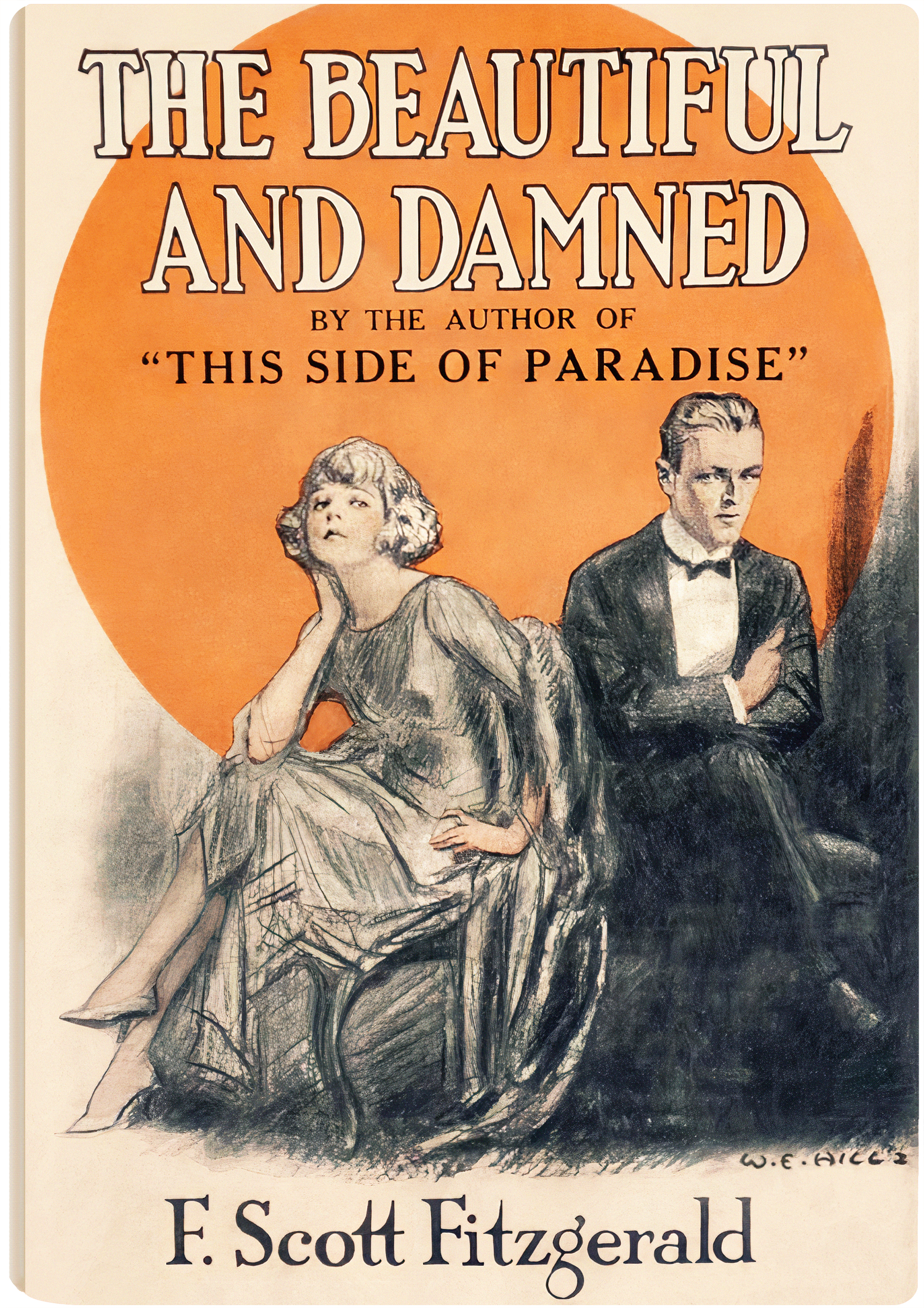
Fitzgerald improved upon his form and construction in The Beautiful and Damned (1922).

For his sophomore effort, Fitzgerald discarded the trappings of collegiate bildungsromans and crafted an "ironical-pessimistic" novel in the style of Thomas Hardy's oeuvre. With the publication of The Beautiful and Damned, editor Max Perkins and others commended the conspicuous evolution in the quality of his prose. Whereas This Side of Paradise had featured workmanlike prose and chaotic organization, The Beautiful and Damned displayed the superior form and construction of an awakened literary consciousness.

Although critics deemed The Beautiful and Damned to be less ground-breaking than its predecessor, many recognized that the vast improvement in literary form and construction between his first and second novels augured great prospects for Fitzgerald's future. John V. A. Weaver predicted in 1922 that, as Fitzgerald matured as a writer, he would become regarded as one of the greatest authors of American literature. Consequently, expectations arose that Fitzgerald would significantly improve with his third work.

When composing The Great Gatsby, Fitzgerald chose to depart from the writing process of his previous novels and to fashion a conscious artistic achievement. He eschewed the realism of his previous two novels and composed a creative work of sustained imagination. To this end, he consciously emulated the literary styles of Joseph Conrad and Willa Cather. He was particularly influenced by Cather's 1923 work, A Lost Lady, which features a wealthy married socialite pursued by a number of romantic suitors and who symbolically embodies the American dream.

With the publication of The Great Gatsby, Fitzgerald had refined his prose style and plot construction, and the literati now hailed him as a master of his craft. Readers complimented him that Gatsby "is compact, economical, polished in the technique of the novel," and his writing now contained "some of the nicest little touches of contemporary observation you could imagine—so light, so delicate, so sharp". By eliminating the earlier defects in his writing, he had upgraded from "a brilliant improvisateur" to "a conscientious and painstaking artist." Gertrude Stein posited that Fitzgerald had surpassed contemporary writers such as Hemingway due to his masterful ability to write in natural sentences.

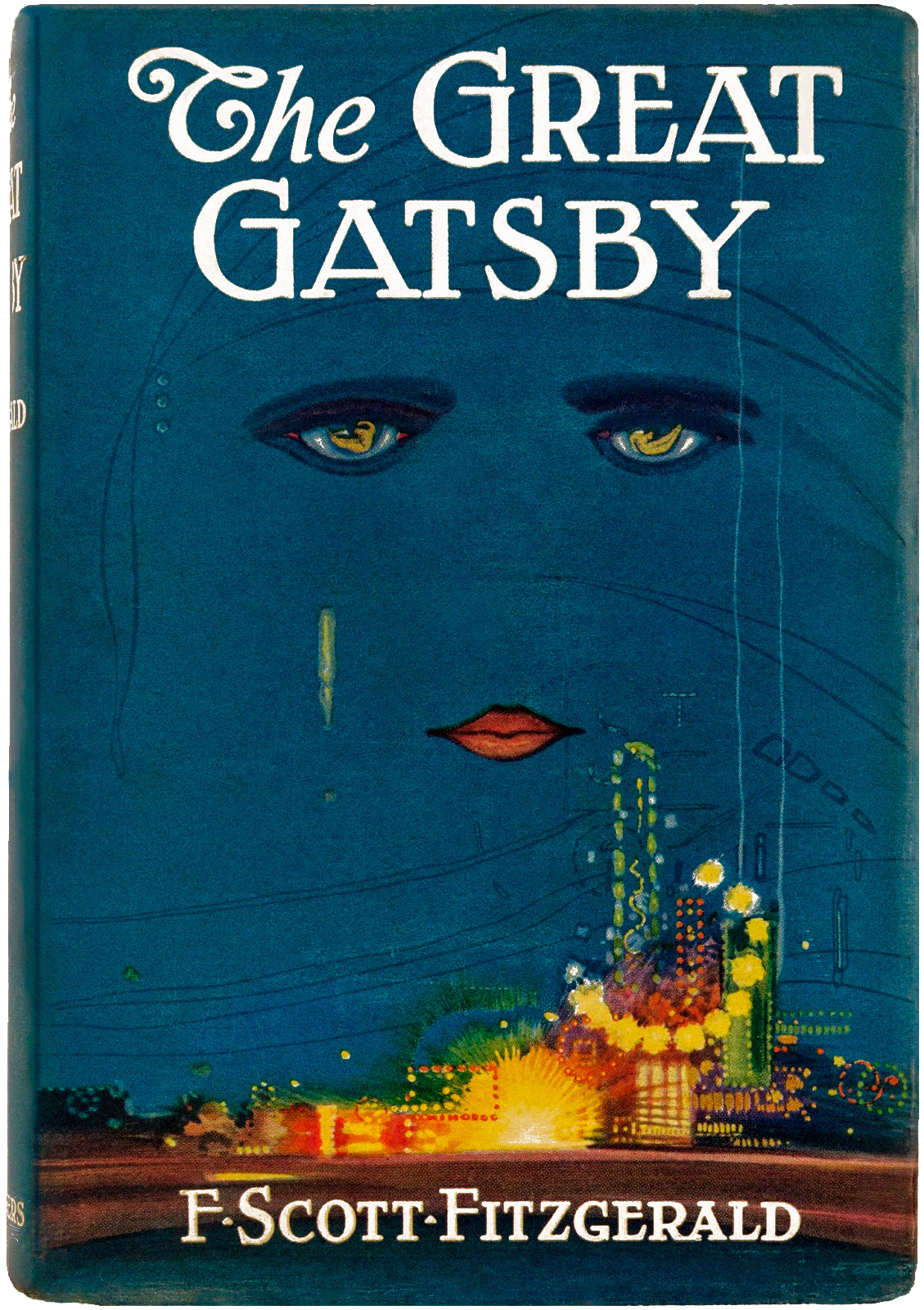
With the publication of The Great Gatsby (1925), critics deemed Fitzgerald to have mastered the craft of a novelist.

The realization that Fitzgerald had improved as a novelist to point that Gatsby was a masterwork was immediately evident to certain members of the literary world. Edith Wharton lauded Gatsby as such an improvement upon Fitzgerald's previous work that it represented a "leap into the future" for American novels, and T. S. Eliot believed it represented a turning point in American literature. After reading Gatsby, Gertrude Stein declared that Fitzgerald would "be read when many of his well-known contemporaries are forgotten." Today, The Great Gatsby is often cited as a literary masterwork and a contender for the title of the "Great American Novel".

Nine years after the publication of The Great Gatsby, Fitzgerald completed his fourth novel Tender Is the Night in 1934. By this time, the field of literature had greatly changed due to the onset of the Great Depression, and once popular writers such as Fitzgerald and Hemingway who wrote about upper-middle-class lifestyles were now disparaged in literary periodicals whereas so-called "proletarian novelists" enjoyed general applause.

Due to this change, although Fitzgerald showed a mastery of "verbal nuance, flexible rhythm, dramatic construction and essential tragi-comedy" in Tender Is the Night, many reviewers dismissed the work for its disengagement with the political issues of the era. Nevertheless, a minority opinion praised the work as the best American novel since The Great Gatsby. Summarizing Fitzgerald's artistic journey from apprentice novelist to magisterial author, Burke Van Allen observed that no other American novelist had shown such "a constantly growing mastery of his equipment, and a regularly increasing sensitivity to the esthetic values in life."

After Fitzgerald's death, writers such as John Dos Passos assayed Fitzgerald's gradual progression in literary quality and posited that his uncompleted fifth novel The Last Tycoon could have been Fitzgerald's greatest achievement. Dos Passos argued in 1945 that Fitzgerald had finally attained a grand and distinctive style as a novelist; consequently, even as an unfinished fragment, the dimensions of his work raised "the level of American fiction" in the same way that "Marlowe's blank verse line raised the whole of Elizabeth verse."

==== Short stories ====
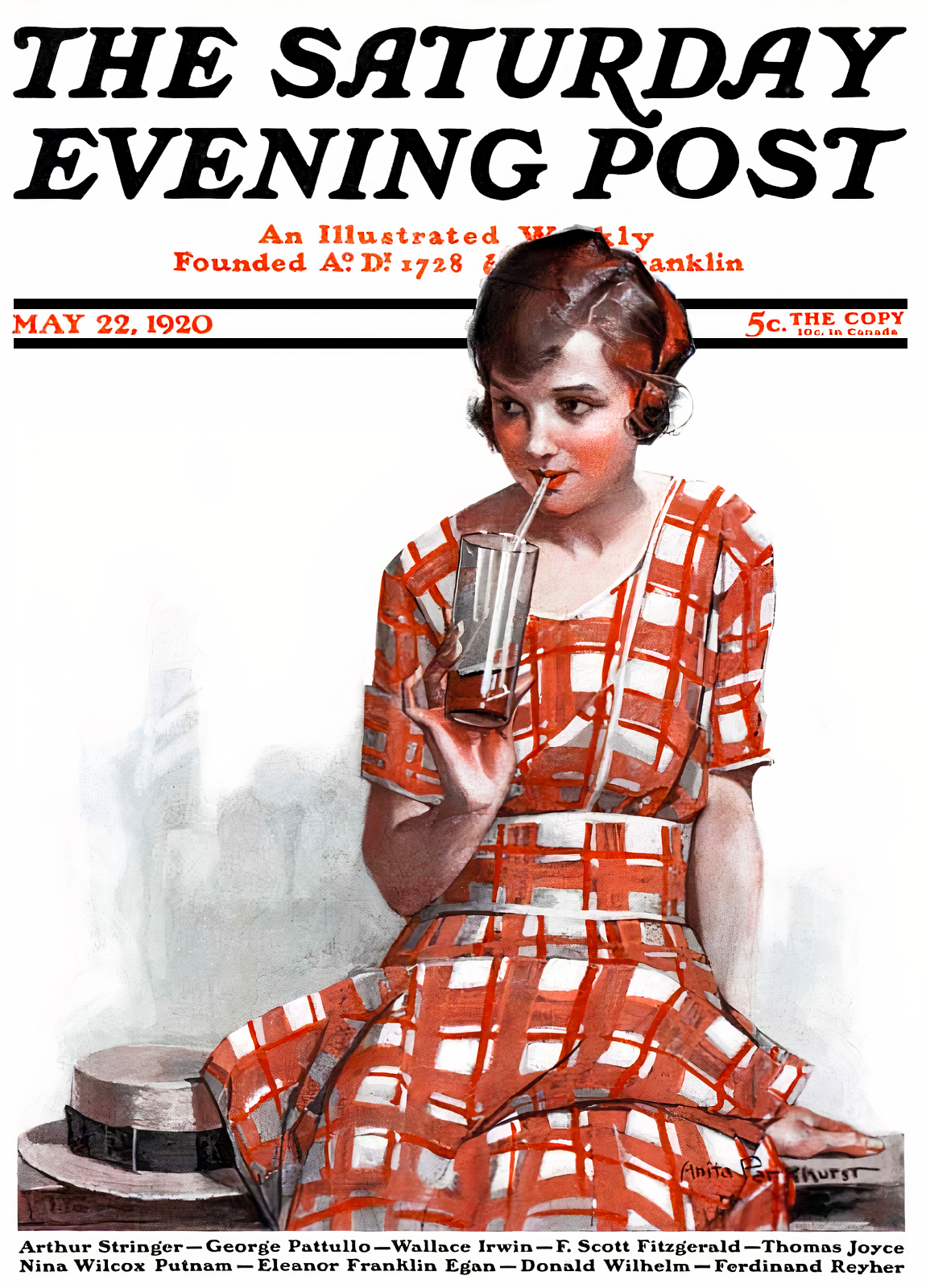
Critics regard Fitzgerald's stories for slick magazines as inferior to his novels.

In contrast to the discernible progression in literary quality and artistic maturity represented by his novels, Fitzgerald's 164 short stories displayed the opposite tendency and attracted significant criticism. Whereas he composed his novels with a conscious artistic mindset, money became his primary impetus for writing short stories. During the lengthy interludes between novels, his stories sustained him financially, but he lamented that he had "to write a lot of rotten stuff that bores me and makes me depressed."

Realizing that slick magazines such as the Saturday Evening Post and Esquire were more likely to publish stories that pandered to young love and featured saccharine dénouements, Fitzgerald became adept at tailoring his short fiction to the vicissitudes of commercial tastes. In this fashion, he quickly became one of the highest-paid magazine writers of his era and he earned $4,000 per story from the Saturday Evening Post at the apex of his fame.

From 1920 until his death, Fitzgerald published nearly four pieces per year in the magazine and, in 1931 alone, he earned nearly $40,000 (equivalent to $846,827 in 2025) by churning out seventeen short stories in quick succession.

Although a dazzling extemporizer, Fitzgerald's short stories were criticized for lacking both thematic coherence and quality. Critic Paul Rosenfeld wrote that many of Fitzgerald's short stories "lie on a plane inferior to the one upon which his best material extends." Echoing Hemingway's critique that Fitzgerald ruined his short stories by rewriting them to appease magazine readers, Rosenfeld noted that Fitzgerald debased his gift as a storyteller by transforming his tales into social romances with inevitably happy endings.

Commenting upon this tendency in Fitzgerald's short stories, Dos Passos remarked that "everybody who has put pen to paper during the last twenty years has been daily plagued by the difficulty of deciding whether he's to do 'good' writing that will satisfy his conscience or 'cheap' writing that will satisfy his pocketbook.... A great deal of Fitzgerald's own life was made a hell by this sort of schizophrenia."

=== Fictive themes ===
==== Generational zeitgeist ====
Here was a new generation, shouting the old cries, learning the old creeds, through a revery of long days and nights; destined finally to go out into that dirty gray turmoil to follow love and pride; a new generation dedicated more than the last to the fear of poverty and the worship of success; grown up to find all Gods dead, all wars fought, all faiths in man shaken.

— F. Scott Fitzgerald, This Side of Paradise (1920)

For much of his literary career, cultural commentators hailed Fitzgerald as the foremost chronicler of the Jazz Age generation whose lives were defined by the societal transition towards modernity. In contrast to the older Lost Generation to which Fitzgerald and Hemingway belonged, the Jazz Age generation were younger Americans who had been adolescents during World War I and were largely untouched by the devastating conflict's psychological and material horrors. (Note: Fitzgerald was adamant that World War I did not spawn the Jazz Age. He not only rejected the claim that "the world war broke down the moral barriers of the younger generation", he believed that "except for leaving its touch of destruction here and there, I do not think the war left any real lasting effect.")

With his debut novel, Fitzgerald became the first writer to turn the national spotlight upon this generation. He riveted the nation's attention upon the activities of their sons and daughters cavorting in the rumble seat of a Bearcat roadster on a lonely road and sparked a societal debate over their perceived immorality. Due to this thematic focus, his works became a sensation among college students, and the press depicted him as the standard-bearer for "youth in revolt". "No generation of Americans has had a chronicler so persuasive and unmaudlin" as Fitzgerald, Van Allen wrote in 1934, and no author was so identified with the generation recorded.

Remarking upon the cultural association between Fitzgerald and the flaming youth of the Jazz Age, Gertrude Stein wrote in her memoir The Autobiography of Alice B. Toklas that the author's fiction essentially created this new generation in the public's mind. Echoing this assertion, critics John V. A. Weaver and Edmund Wilson insisted that Fitzgerald imbued the Jazz Age generation with the gift of self-consciousness while simultaneously making the public aware of them as a distinct cohort.

The perception of Fitzgerald as the chronicler of the Jazz Age and its insouciant youth led various societal figures to denounce his writings. They decried his use of modern "alien slang" and claimed his depiction of young people engaged in drunken sprees and premarital sex to be wholly fabricated. Fitzgerald ridiculed such criticisms, and he opined that blinkered pundits wished to dismiss his works in order to retain their outdated conceptions of American society.

As Fitzgerald's writings made him "the outstanding aggressor in the little warfare" between "the flaming youth against the old guard," a number of social conservatives later rejoiced when he died. Mere weeks after Fitzgerald's death in 1940, Westbrook Pegler wrote in a column for The New York World-Telegram that the author's passing recalled "memories of a queer bunch of undisciplined and self-indulgent brats who were determined not to pull their weight in the boat and wanted the world to drop everything and sit down and bawl with them. A kick in the pants and a clout over the scalp were more like their needing."

==== Wealth inequality ====
Let me tell you about the very rich. They are different from you and me. They possess and enjoy early, and it does something to them, makes them soft where we are hard, and cynical where we are trustful, in a way that, unless you were born rich, it is very difficult to understand. They think, deep in their hearts, that they are better than we are....

— F. Scott Fitzgerald, "The Rich Boy" (1926)

A recurrent theme in F. Scott Fitzgerald's fiction is the psychic and moral gulf between the average American and wealthy elites. This recurrent theme is ascribable to Fitzgerald's life experiences in which he was "a poor boy in a rich town; a poor boy in a rich boy's school; a poor boy in a rich man's club at Princeton." He "sensed a corruption in the rich and mistrusted their might." Consequently, he became a vocal critic of America's leisure class and his works satirized their lives.

This preoccupation with the idle lives of America's leisure class in Fitzgerald's fiction attracted criticism. H. L. Mencken believed Fitzgerald's myopic focus upon the rich detracted from the broader relevance of his societal observations. He argued that "the thing that chiefly interests the basic Fitzgerald is still the florid show of modern American life—and especially the devil's dance and that goes on at the top. He is unconcerned about the sweating and suffering of the nether herd".

Nevertheless, Mencken conceded that Fitzgerald came the closest to capturing the wealthy's "idiotic pursuit of sensation, their almost incredible stupidity and triviality, their glittering swinishness". His works skewered those "who take all of the privileges of the European ruling class and assume none of its responsibilities". For this reason, critics predicted that much of Fitzgerald's fiction would become timeless social documents that captured the naked venality of the hedonistic Jazz Age.

Following Fitzgerald's death, scholars focused on how Fitzgerald's fiction dissects the entrenched class disparities in American society. His novel, The Great Gatsby, underscores the limits of the American lower class to transcend their station of birth. Although scholars posit different explanations for the continuation of class differences in the United States, there is a consensus regarding Fitzgerald's belief in its underlying permanence. Although fundamental conflict occurs between entrenched sources of socio-economic power and upstarts who threaten their interests, Fitzgerald's fiction shows that a class permanence persists despite the country's capitalist economy that prizes innovation and adaptability. Even if the poorer Americans become rich, they remain inferior to those Americans with "old money". Consequently, Fitzgerald's characters are trapped in a rigid American class system.

==== Otherness ====
Much of Fitzgerald's fiction is informed by his life experiences as a societal outsider. As a young boy growing up in the Midwest, he perpetually strained "to meet the standard of the rich people of St. Paul and Chicago among whom he had to grow up without ever having the money to compete with them". His wealthier neighbors viewed the young author and his family to be lower-class, and his classmates at affluent institutions such as Newman and Princeton regarded him as a parvenu. His later life as an expatriate in Europe and as a writer in Hollywood reinforced this lifelong sense of being an outsider.

Consequently, many of Fitzgerald's characters are defined by their sense of "otherness". In particular, Jay Gatsby, whom other characters belittle as "Mr. Nobody from Nowhere", functions as a cipher because of his obscure origins, his unclear ethno-religious identity and his indeterminate class status. Much like Fitzgerald, Gatsby's ancestry precludes him from the coveted status of Old Stock Americans. Consequently, Gatsby's ascent is deemed a threat not only due to his status as nouveau riche, but because he is perceived as an outsider.

Because of such themes, scholars assert that Fitzgerald's fiction captures the perennial American experience, since it is a story about outsiders and those who resent them—whether such outsiders are newly-arrived immigrants, the nouveau riche, or successful minorities. Since Americans living in the 1920s to the present must navigate a society with entrenched prejudices, Fitzgerald's depiction of resultant status anxieties and social conflict in his fiction has been highlighted by scholars as still enduringly relevant nearly a hundred years later.

=== Criticism ===
==== Alleged vacuity ====
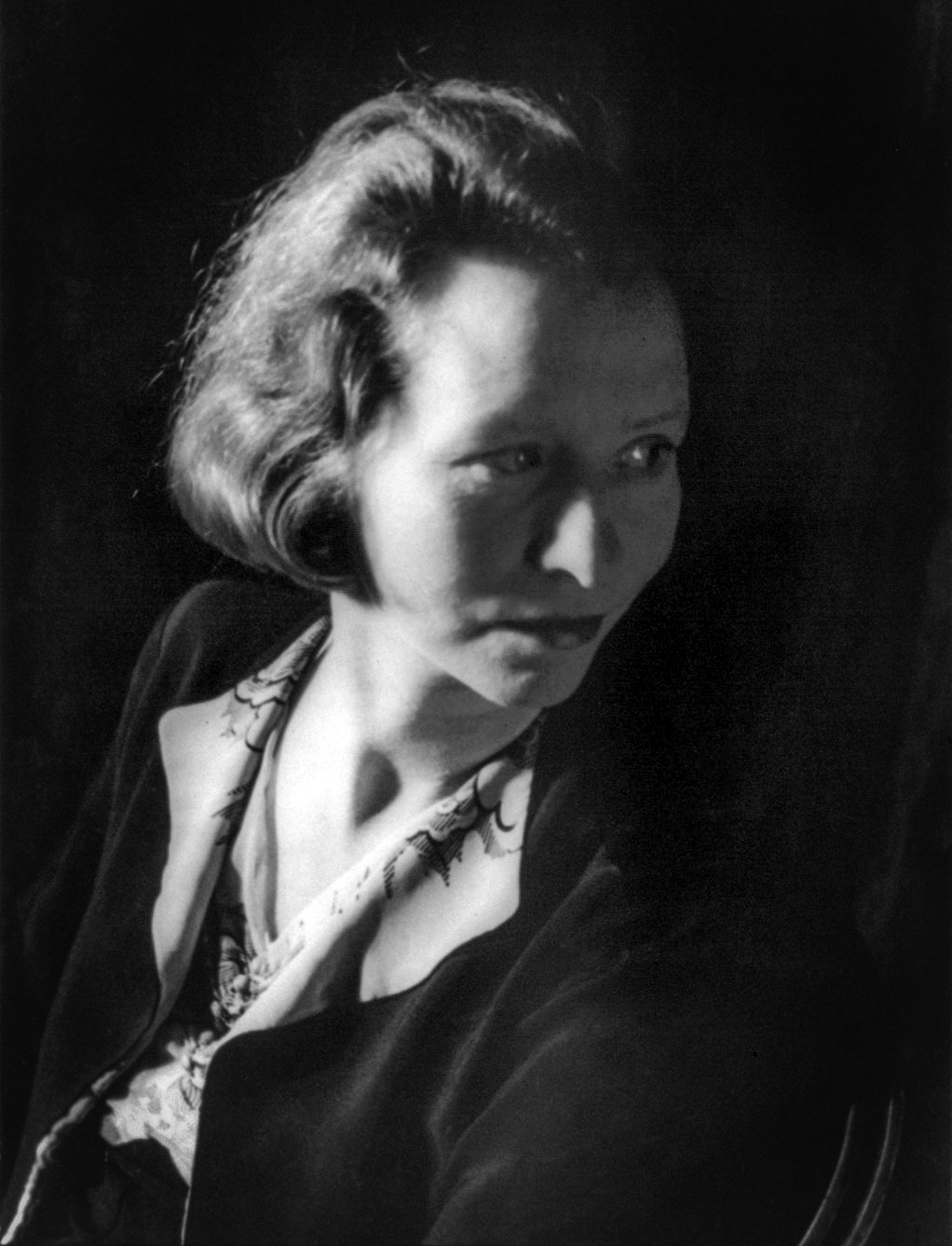
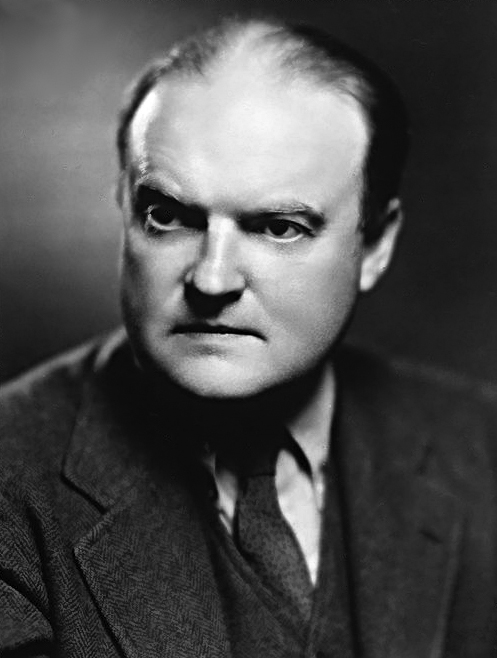
Poet Edna St. Vincent Millay opined that Fitzgerald, although a gifted writer, had little of importance to say in his fiction. Edmund Wilson likewise opined the author had few ideas to express in his work.

Although many contemporary critics and literary peers regarded Fitzgerald as possessing "the best narrative gift of the century", they nonetheless contended that his fiction lacked engagement with the salient socio-political issues of his time, and he lacked a conscious awareness of how to use his considerable talent as an author.

Poet Edna St. Vincent Millay, who met Fitzgerald during his years abroad in Paris, likened him to "a stupid old woman with whom someone has left a diamond; she is extremely proud of the diamond and shows it to everyone who comes by, and everyone is surprised that such an ignorant old woman should possess so valuable a jewel". His friend Edmund Wilson concurred with Millay's assessment and averred that Fitzgerald was a gifted writer with a vivid imagination who did not have any intellectual ideas to express. Wilson argued that Fitzgerald's early works such as This Side of Paradise suffer from the defects of being meaningless and lacking intellectual substance.

Wilson attempted to convince Fitzgerald to write about America's social problems, but Fitzgerald did not believe that fiction should be used as a political instrument. Wilson also pressed Fitzgerald to support causes like the defense of Sacco and Vanzetti, but Fitzgerald had no interest in activism, and he became annoyed to even read articles about the politically-fraught Sacco and Vanzetti case, which became a cause célèbre among American literati during the 1920s. Largely indifferent to politics, Fitzgerald himself ascribed the lack of ideational substance in his fiction to his upbringing, as his parents were likewise uninterested in such matters.

Fitzgerald partly justified the perceived lack of political and intellectual substance in his fiction by arguing that he was writing for a new, largely apolitical, generation "dedicated more than the last to the fear of poverty and the worship of success; grown up to find all Gods dead, all wars fought, all faiths in man shaken." "Nobody was interested in politics," Fitzgerald declared of this particular generation, and, as "it was characteristic of the Jazz Age that it had no interest in politics at all", Fitzgerald's fiction reflected the contemporary zeitgeist's perfunctory cynicism and aversion to political crusades in the wake of Prohibition.

==== Appropriative tendency ====
Throughout his literary career, Fitzgerald often drew upon the private correspondence, diary entries, and life experiences of other persons to use in his fiction. While writing This Side of Paradise, Fitzgerald quoted verbatim entire letters sent to him by his Catholic mentor, Father Sigourney Fay. In addition to using Fay's correspondence, Fitzgerald drew upon anecdotes that Fay had told him about his private life. When reading This Side of Paradise, Fay wrote to Fitzgerald that the use of his own biographical experiences told in confidence to the young author "gave him a queer feeling."

Fitzgerald continued this practice throughout his life. While writing The Beautiful and Damned, Fitzgerald inserted sentences from his wife's diary. When his friend Burton Rascoe asked Zelda to review the book for the New-York Tribune as a publicity stunt, she wrote—partly in jest—that it "seems to me that on one page I recognized a portion of an old diary of mine which mysteriously disappeared shortly after my marriage, and also scraps of letters, which, though considerably edited, sound to me vaguely familiar." (Note: According to Fitzgerald scholar Matthew J. Bruccoli, "Zelda does not say she collaborated on The Beautiful and Damned: only that Fitzgerald incorporated a portion of her diary 'on one page' and that he revised 'scraps' of her letters. None of Fitzgerald's surviving manuscripts shows her hand".) Similarly, Fitzgerald borrowed biographical incidents from his friend, Ludlow Fowler, for his short story "The Rich Boy". Fowler asked that certain passages be excised prior to publication. Fitzgerald acquiesced to this request, but the passages were restored in later reprints after Fitzgerald's death.

Perhaps the most striking example of this tendency lies at the core of The Great Gatsby. As a parting gift before their relationship ended, Ginevra King—the inspiration for Daisy Buchanan—wrote a story that she sent to Fitzgerald. In her story, she is trapped in a loveless marriage with a wealthy man, yet still pines for Fitzgerald, a former lover from her past. The lovers are reunited only after Fitzgerald has attained enough money to take her away from her adulterous husband. Fitzgerald frequently re-read Ginevra's story, and scholars have noted the plot similarities between Ginevra's story and Fitzgerald's novel.

== Legacy ==
=== Literary influence ===
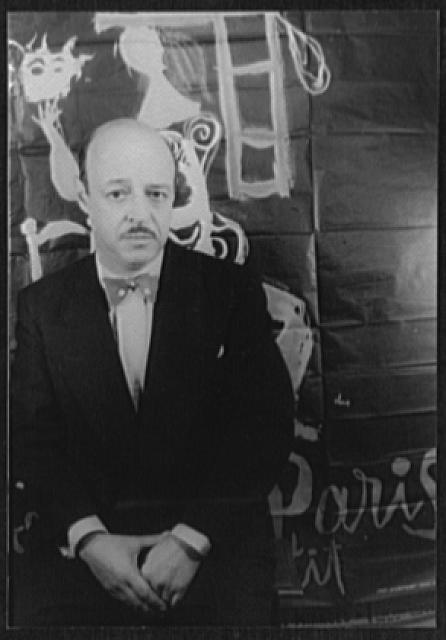
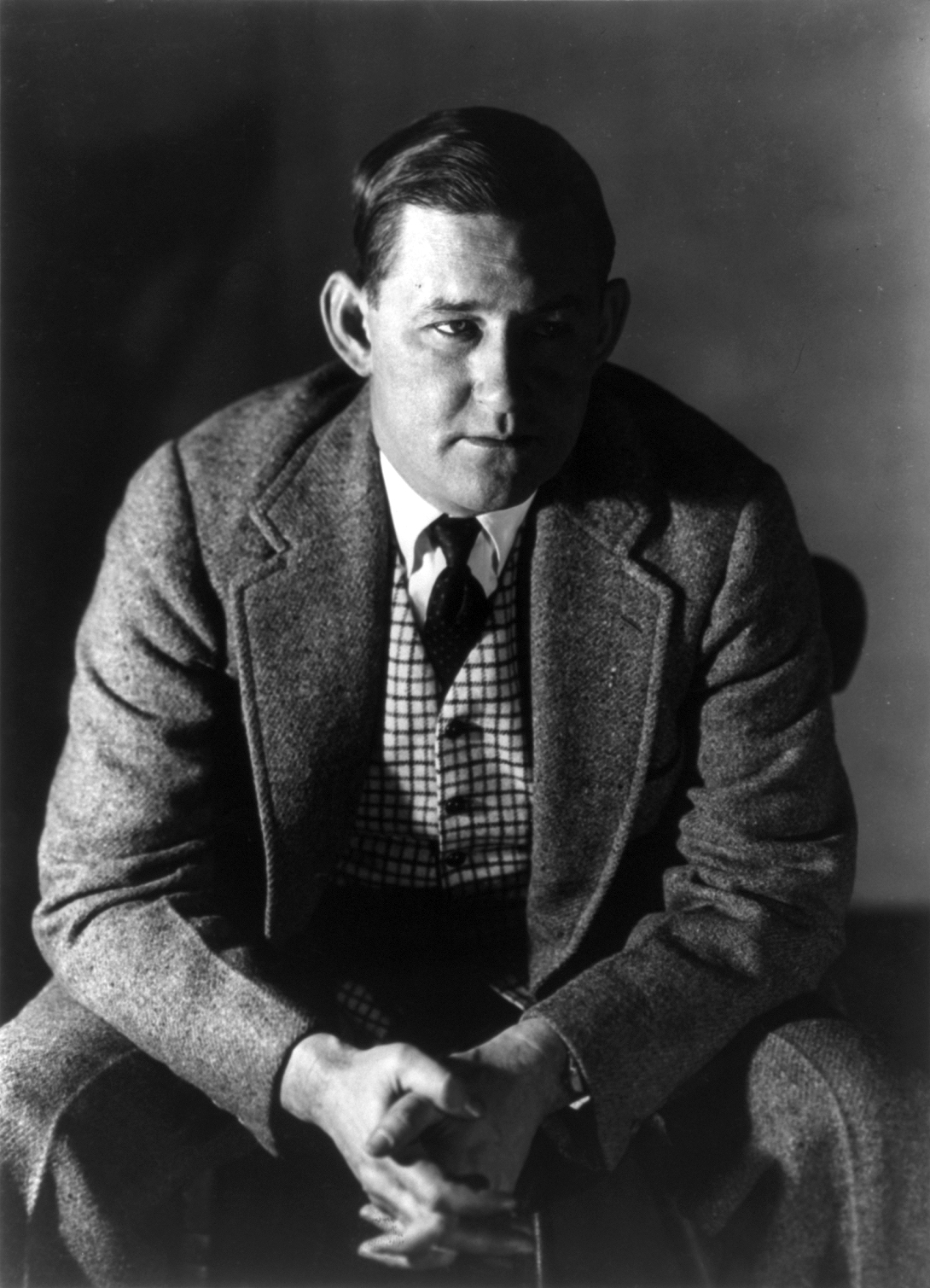
Writer Charles R. Jackson hailed Fitzgerald's The Great Gatsby as the only flawless novel in the history of American literature, and writer John O'Hara stated that Fitzgerald influenced his work.

As one of the leading authorial voices of the Jazz Age, Fitzgerald's literary style influenced a number of contemporary and future writers. As early as 1922, critic John V. A. Weaver noted that Fitzgerald's literary influence was already "so great that it cannot be estimated."

Similar to Edith Wharton and Henry James, Fitzgerald's style often used a series of disconnected scenes to convey plot developments. His lifelong editor Max Perkins described this particular technique as creating the impression for the reader of a railroad journey in which the vividness of passing scenes blaze with life. In the style of Joseph Conrad, Fitzgerald often employed a narrator's device to unify these passing scenes and imbue them with deeper meaning.

Gatsby remains Fitzgerald's most influential literary work as an author. The publication of The Great Gatsby prompted poet T. S. Eliot to opine that the novel was the most significant evolution in American fiction since the works of Henry James. Charles Jackson, author of The Lost Weekend, wrote that Gatsby was the only flawless novel in the history of American literature. Later authors Budd Schulberg and Edward Newhouse were deeply affected by it, and John O'Hara acknowledged its influence on his work. Richard Yates, a writer often compared to Fitzgerald, hailed The Great Gatsby as showcasing Fitzgerald's miraculous talent and triumphal literary technique. An editorial in The New York Times summarized the considerable influence of Fitzgerald upon contemporary writers and Americans in general during the Jazz Age: "In the literary sense he invented a 'generation' ... He might have interpreted them, and even guided them, as in their middle years they saw a different and nobler freedom threatened with destruction."

=== Adaptations and portrayals ===
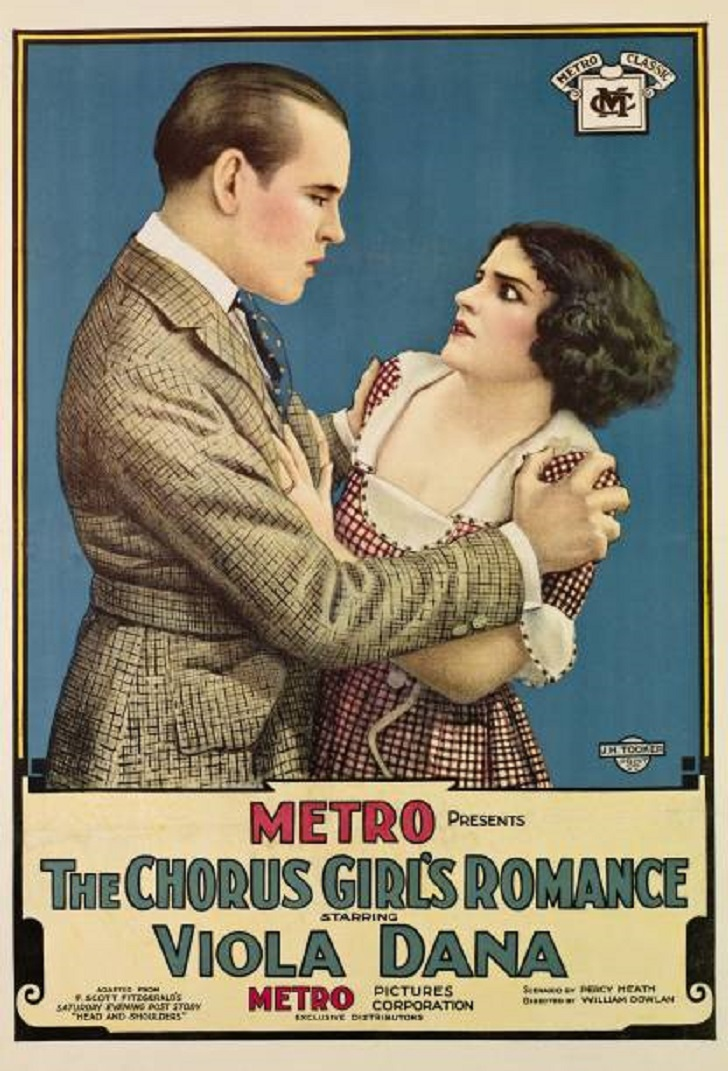
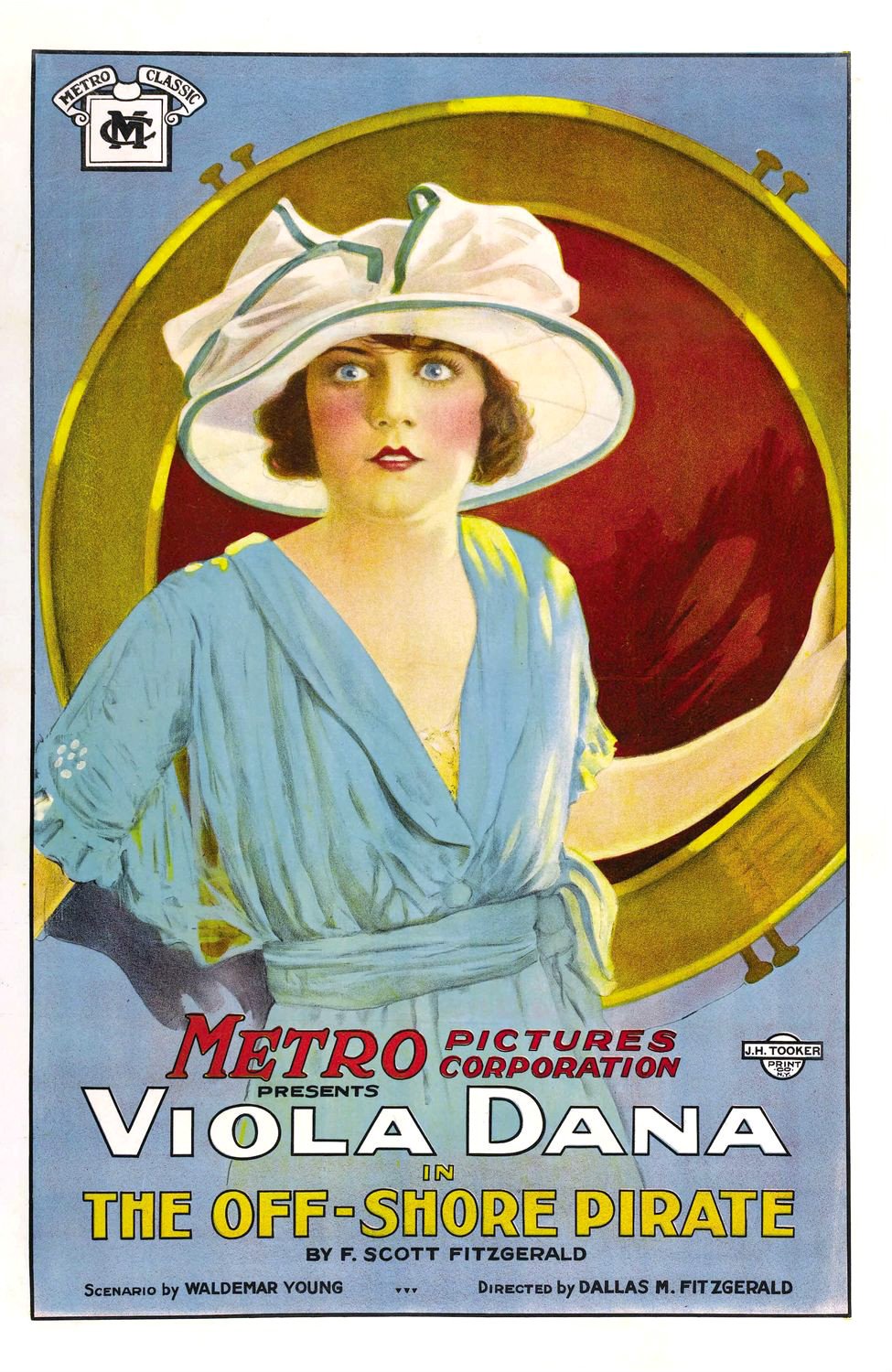
The silent films The Chorus Girl's Romance (1920) and The Off-Shore Pirate (1921) were among the first cinematic adaptations of Fitzgerald's works.

Fitzgerald's stories and novels have been adapted into a variety of media formats. His earliest short stories were cinematically adapted as flapper comedies such as The Husband Hunter (1920), The Chorus Girl's Romance (1920), and The Off-Shore Pirate (1921). Other Fitzgerald short stories have been adapted into episodes of anthology television series, as well as the 2008 film The Curious Case of Benjamin Button. Nearly every novel by Fitzgerald has been adapted for the screen. His second novel The Beautiful and Damned was filmed in 1922 and 2010. His third novel The Great Gatsby has been adapted numerous times for both film and television, most notably in 1926, 1949, 1958, 1974, 2000, and 2013. His fourth novel Tender Is the Night was made into a 1955 CBS television episode, an eponymous 1962 film, and a BBC television miniseries in 1985. The Last Tycoon has been adapted into a 1976 film, and a 2016 Amazon Prime TV miniseries.

Beyond adaptations of his works, Fitzgerald himself has been portrayed in dozens of books, plays, and films. He inspired Budd Schulberg's novel The Disenchanted (1950), later adapted into a Broadway play starring Jason Robards. Other theatrical productions of Fitzgerald's life include Frank Wildhorn's 2005 musical Waiting for the Moon, and a musical produced by the Japanese Takarazuka Revue. Fitzgerald's relationships with Sheilah Graham and Frances Kroll Ring respectively served as the basis for the films Beloved Infidel (1959) and Last Call (2002). Fitzgerald and his wife Zelda have appeared as characters in the films Midnight in Paris (2011) and Genius (2016). Other depictions of Fitzgerald include the TV movies Zelda (1993), F. Scott Fitzgerald in Hollywood (1976), The Last of the Belles (1974), and the TV series Z: The Beginning of Everything (2015).

== Selected works ==
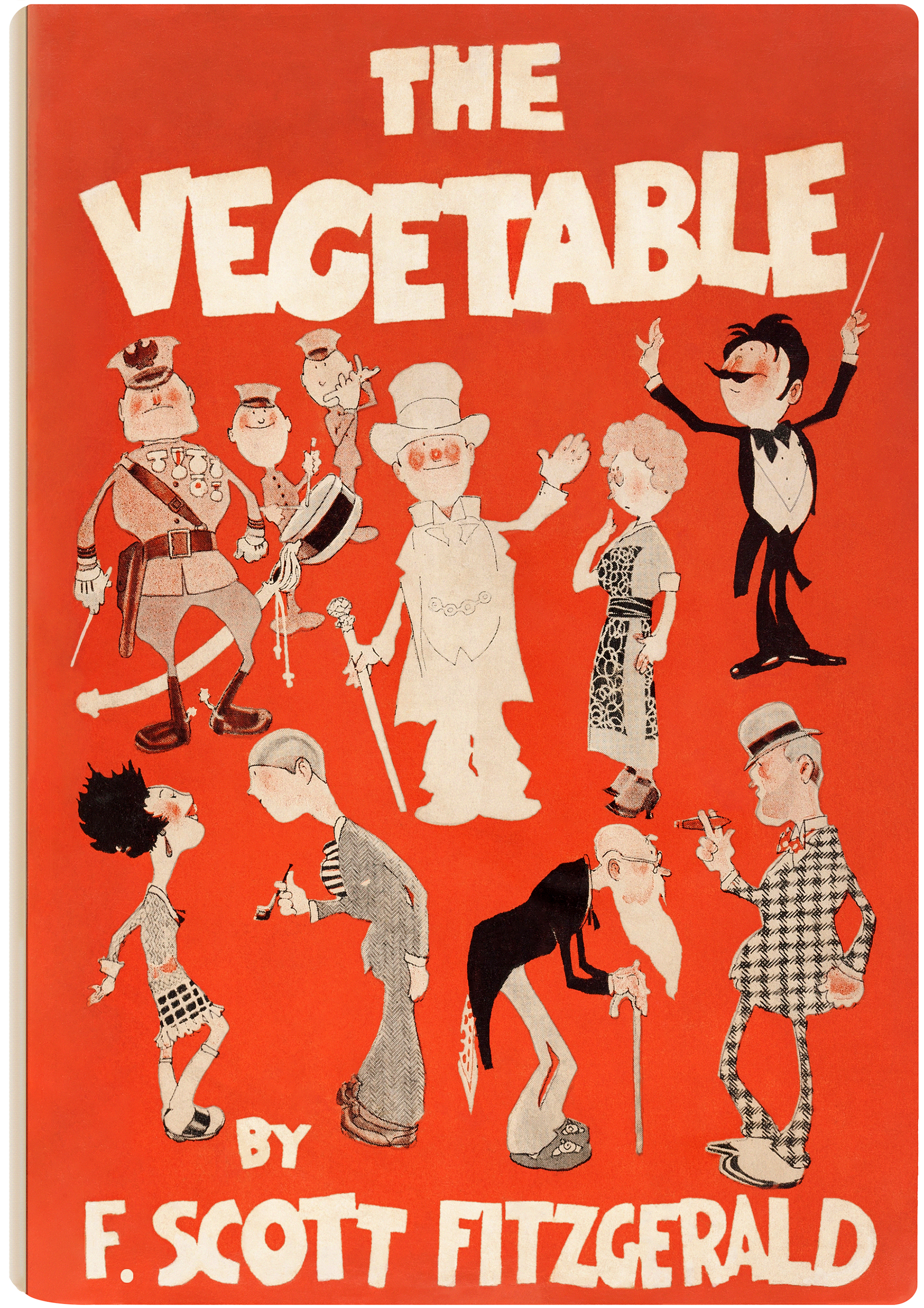
Cover of Fitzgerald's 1923 play, The Vegetable

=== Novels ===
- 1920 – This Side of Paradise
- 1922 – The Beautiful and Damned
- 1922 – The Diamond as Big as the Ritz (Novella)
- 1925 – The Great Gatsby
- 1934 – Tender Is the Night
- 1941 – The Last Tycoon (unfinished)

=== Short stories ===
- 1920 – "The Ice Palace"
- 1920 – "Bernice Bobs Her Hair"
- 1920 – "May Day"
- 1922 – "The Curious Case of Benjamin Button"
- 1922 – "Winter Dreams"
- 1924 – "Absolution"
- 1926 – "The Rich Boy"
- 1931 – "Babylon Revisited"

=== Essays ===
- 1931 – "Echoes of the Jazz Age"
