= Adaptations and portrayals of F. Scott Fitzgerald =

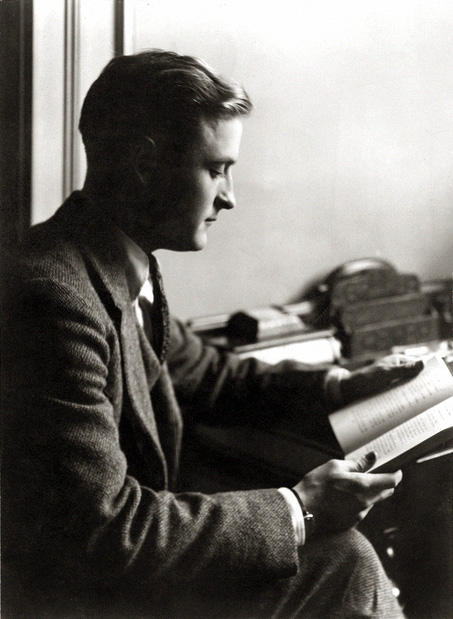
F. Scott Fitzgerald circa 1920

F. Scott Fitzgerald was an American writer known for his novels and short stories which often celebrated the decadence and excess of the Jazz Age. Many of his literary works were adapted into cinematic films, television episodes, and theatrical productions. Although a number of his works were adapted during his lifetime, the number of adaptations greatly increased following his death, and several cinematic adaptations gained considerable critical acclaim.

The earliest adaptations of Fitzgerald's work were flapper film comedies such as The Husband Hunter (1920) and The Off-Shore Pirate (1921). Notable film adaptations of his novel The Great Gatsby include a 1974 film—which featured a script by Francis Ford Coppola and starred Robert Redford and Mia Farrow—and a 2013 adaptation which featured Leonardo DiCaprio in the titular role. His later novel The Last Tycoon was adapted by Elia Kazan into a 1976 film, with an ensemble cast featuring Robert De Niro and Jack Nicholson among others.

Beyond adaptations of his novels and stories, Fitzgerald himself has been portrayed in a variety of media, including novels and theatrical productions. On film, he has been portrayed by actors such as Tom Hiddleston, Jeremy Irons, and Gregory Peck.

== Adaptations ==
=== Short stories ===
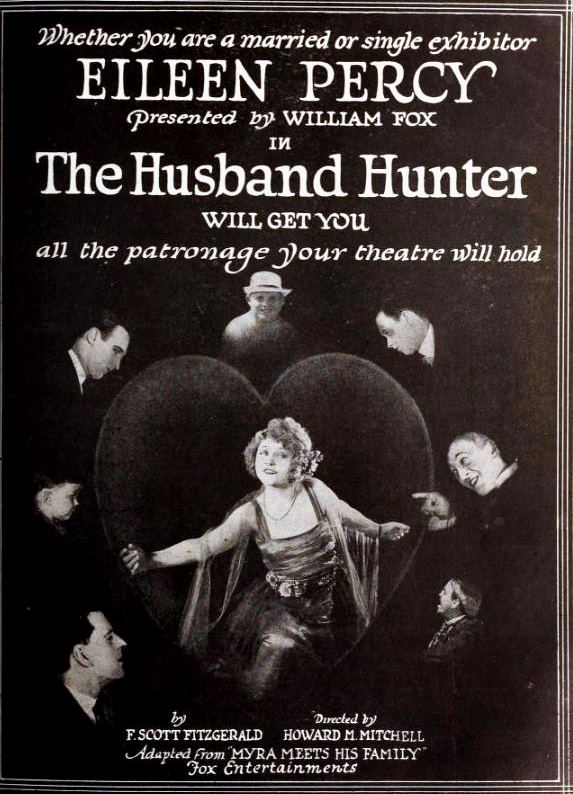
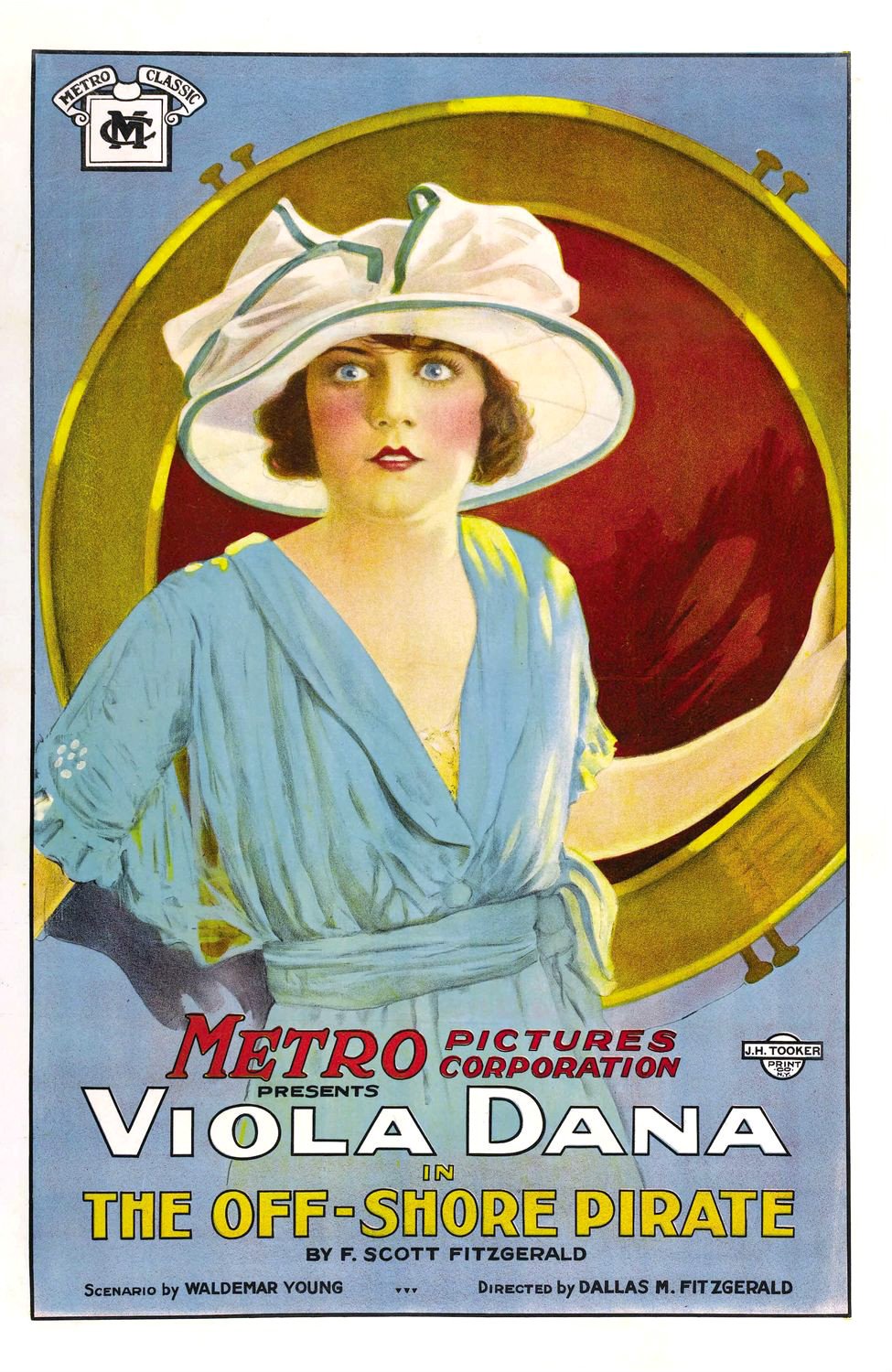
The silent films The Husband Hunter (1920) and The Off-Shore Pirate (1921) were among the first cinematic adaptations of Fitzgerald's works.

Fitzgerald's stories and novels have been adapted many times into a variety of media formats. His earliest short stories were cinematically adapted as flapper comedies such as The Husband Hunter (1920), The Chorus Girl's Romance (1920), and The Off-Shore Pirate (1921). The latter two both starred Viola Dana. His short story "Bernice Bobs Her Hair" was adapted in 1951 as a CBS Starlight Theatre episode starring Julie Harris and in 1976 as a PBS American Short Story episode starring Shelley Duvall. Additionally, his short story "The Curious Case of Benjamin Button" was the basis for a 2008 film.

=== Novels ===
Nearly every novel by Fitzgerald has been adapted for the screen. His second novel The Beautiful and Damned was filmed in 1922 and 2010. His third novel The Great Gatsby has been adapted numerous times for both film and television over the past century, most notably in the 1926, 1949, 1958, 1974, 2000, and 2013 incarnations. His fourth novel Tender Is the Night was made into a 1955 CBS television episode, an eponymous 1962 film, and a BBC television miniseries in 1985. In 1976, his unfinished fifth novel The Last Tycoon was adapted into a film starring Robert de Niro, and in 2016 it was adapted as an Amazon Prime TV miniseries.

== Portrayals ==
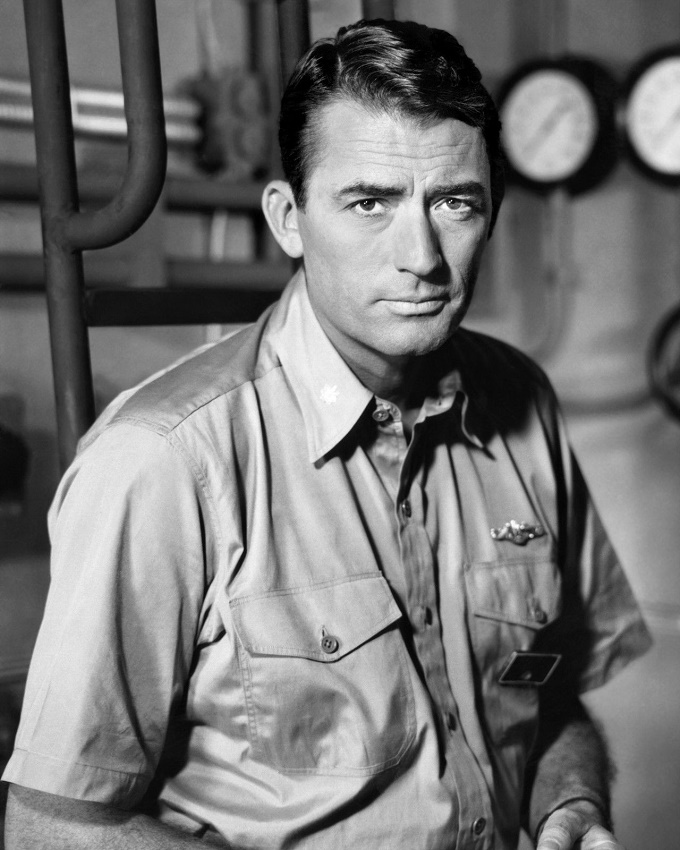
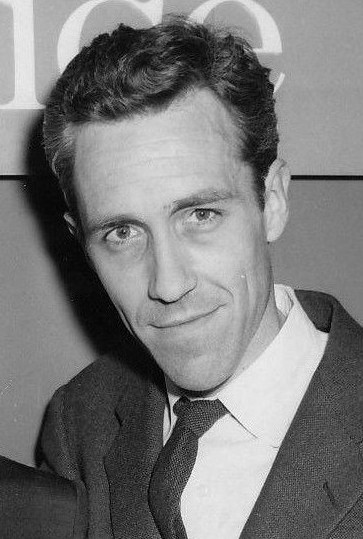
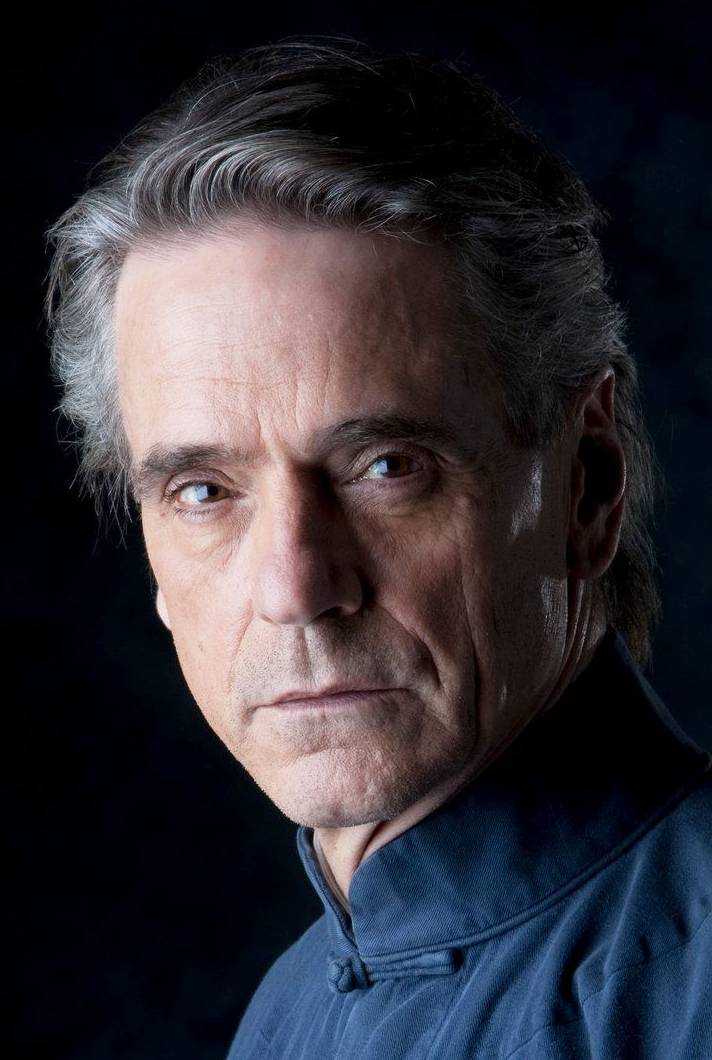
Gregory Peck, Jason Robards, and Jeremy Irons have portrayed Fitzgerald in various film productions.

Beyond adaptations of his novels and stories, Fitzgerald himself has been portrayed in dozens of books, plays, and films. He inspired Budd Schulberg's novel The Disenchanted (1950), which follows an apprentice screenwriter in Hollywood collaborating with a drunk and flawed novelist. It was later adapted into a Broadway play starring Jason Robards. A musical about the lives of Fitzgerald and his wife Zelda Sayre was composed by Frank Wildhorn in 2005 and entitled Waiting for the Moon. Due to his continuing appeal and international reputation as an author, the Japanese Takarazuka Revue created a musical adaptation of Fitzgerald's life.

The last years of Fitzgerald's life and his relationship with Sheilah Graham served as the basis for Beloved Infidel (1959) based on Graham's 1958 memoir of the same name. The film depicts an alcoholic Fitzgerald (played by Gregory Peck) and his struggle with sobriety while romancing Graham (played by Deborah Kerr). Another film, Last Call (2002) chronicles the relations between Fitzgerald (Jeremy Irons) and his private secretary Frances Kroll Ring (Neve Campbell).

Other depictions include the TV movies Zelda (1993, with Timothy Hutton), F. Scott Fitzgerald in Hollywood (1976, with Jason Miller), and The Last of the Belles (1974, with Richard Chamberlain). Tom Hiddleston and Alison Pill appear briefly as Fitzgerald and Zelda in Woody Allen's 2011 feature film Midnight in Paris. David Hoflin and Christina Ricci portray the Fitzgeralds in the 2015 television series Z: The Beginning of Everything. Guy Pearce and Vanessa Kirby portray the couple in Genius (2016).

== List of adaptations ==
=== Films ===
Year	Title	Director	Notes	Distributor	Rotten Tomatoes	Metacritic
1920	The Chorus Girl's Romance	William C. Dowlan	Based on the short story "Head and Shoulders".	Metro Pictures	—N/a	—N/a
1920	The Husband Hunter	Howard M. Mitchell	Based on the short story "Myra Meets His Family".	Fox Film Corporation	—N/a	—N/a
1921	The Off-Shore Pirate	Dallas Fitzgerald	Based on the short story "The Offshore Pirate". The film is considered lost	Metro Pictures	—N/a	—N/a
1922	The Beautiful and Damned	William A. Seiter	Based on the novel of the same name. The film is considered lost	Warner Brothers	50% (6 reviews)	—N/a
1924	Grit	Frank Tuttle	Based on a short story of the same name. The film is considered lost	Hodkinson Distribution	—N/a	—N/a
1926	The Great Gatsby	Herbert Brenon	Based on the novel of the same name. The film is considered lost	Paramount Pictures	55% (22 reviews)	—N/a
1949	The Great Gatsby	Elliott Nugent	Based on the novel of the same name.	Paramount Pictures	33% (9 reviews)	—N/a
1954	The Last Time I Saw Paris	Richard Brooks	Based on the short story "Babylon Revisited".	Metro-Goldwyn-Mayer	88% (8 reviews)	—N/a
1962	Tender Is the Night	Henry King	Based on the novel of the same name.	20th Century Fox	—N/a	—N/a
1974	The Great Gatsby	Jack Clayton	Based on the novel of the same name.	Paramount Pictures	39% (36 reviews)	43 (5 reviews)
1976	The Last Tycoon	Elia Kazan	Based on the novel of the same name.	Paramount Pictures	41% (22 reviews)	57 (11 reviews)
2008	The Curious Case of Benjamin Button	David Fincher	Based on a short story of the same name.	Paramount Pictures	71% (258 reviews)	70 (37 reviews)
2013	The Great Gatsby	Baz Luhrmann	Based on the novel of the same name.	Paramount Pictures	48% (301 reviews)	55 (45 reviews)

=== Short films ===
Year	Title	Director	Notes	Distributor	RT
1929	Pusher-in-the-Face	Robert Florey	Based on the short story of the same name.	Paramount Pictures	—N/a
2012	The Dashing Mr. Lowell	Kevin Tello	Based on the short story of the same name.	Carosello Productions	—N/a
2012	The Lost Decade	Nic Fforde	Based on the short story of the same name.	IMS Film & Media Insurance	—N/a
2013	The Offshore Pirate	Eric Heimbold	Based on the short story "The Offshore Pirate".		—N/a
2014	Head and Shoulders	Travis Mills	Based on the short story "Head and Shoulders".	Running Wild Films	—N/a
2015	Bernice Bobs Her Hair	Delilah Napier	Based on the short story of the same name.		—N/a

=== Television ===
Year	Title	Notes	Distributor	Network	RT
1949	The Last Tycoon	Episode of The Philco Television Playhouse based on the novel.	Showcase Productions	NBC	—N/a
1950	"The Cut Glass Bowl"	Episode of Nash Airlyfte Theater based on the short story.	CBS Television Network	CBS	—N/a
1950	"Three Hours Between Planes"	Episode of Starlight Theatre based on the short story.	CBS Television Network	CBS	—N/a
1951	"Bernice Bobs Her Hair"	Episode of Starlight Theatre based on the short story.	CBS Television Network	CBS	—N/a
1951	The Last Tycoon	Episode of Robert Montgomery Presents based on the novel.	Neptune Productions	NBC	—N/a
1952	"Rich Boy"	Episode of The Philco Television Playhouse based on the short story.	Showcase Productions	NBC	—N/a
1952	"The Party"	Episode of Curtain Call based on the short story.	Worthington Miner	NBC	—N/a
1952	"Three Hours Between Planes"	Episode of Lux Theatre based on the short story.	J. Walter Thompson Agency	CBS	—N/a
1953	"The Last Kiss"	Episode of Schlitz Playhouse based on the short story.	CBS Television Network	CBS	—N/a
1953	"The Dance"	Episode of Suspense based on the short story.	CBS Television Network	CBS	—N/a
1954	"Babylon Revisited"	Episode of Ponds Theater based on the short story.	J. Walter Thompson Agency	ABC	—N/a
1955	The Great Gatsby	Episode of Robert Montgomery Presents based on the novel.	Neptune Productions	NBC	—N/a
1955	"The Dance"	Episode of Climax! based on the short story.	CBS Television Network	CBS	—N/a
1955	Tender Is the Night	Episode of Front Row Center based on the novel.	CBS Television Network	CBS	—N/a
1955	"The Diamond as Big as the Ritz"	Episode of Kraft Theatre based on the short story.	J. Walter Thompson Agency	NBC	—N/a
1956	"Winter Dreams"	Episode of Front Row Center based on the short story.	CBS Television Network	CBS	—N/a
1956	"Three Hours Between Planes"	Episode of Star Tonight based on the short story.	ABC Television Network	ABC	—N/a
1956	"The Young and the Beautiful"	Episode of Robert Montgomery Presents based on the short story.	Neptune Productions	NBC	—N/a
1957	The Last Tycoon	Episode of Playhouse 90 based on the novel.	CBS Productions	CBS	—N/a
1957	"Winter Dreams"	Episode of Playhouse 90 based on the short story.	CBS Productions	CBS	—N/a
1958	The Great Gatsby	Episode of Playhouse 90 based on the novel.	CBS Productions	CBS	—N/a
1958	"The Last of the Belles"	Episode of Kraft Theatre based on the short story.	J. Walter Thompson Agency	NBC	—N/a
1959	The Last Tycoon	Episode of Armchair Theatre based on the novel.	ABC Weekend Television	ITV	—N/a
1962	"Crazy Sunday"	Episode of The Dick Powell Theatre based on the short story.	Four Star Productions	NBC	—N/a
1963	"The Camel's Back"	Episode of Teletale based on the short story.	British Broadcasting Corporation	BBC	—N/a
1958	"Majesty"	Episode of The Jazz Age based on the short story.	British Broadcasting Corporation	BBC	—N/a
1974	The Last of the Belles	Television film based on the short story.	Titus Productions	ABC	—N/a
1976	"Bernice Bobs Her Hair"	Television film based on the short story.	PBS Television Network	PBS	—N/a
1984	"Under the Biltmore Clock"	Episode of American Playhouse based on "Myra Meets His Family".	PBS Television Network	PBS	—N/a
1985	Tender Is the Night	Television mini-series based on the novel.	20th Century Fox Television	BBC	—N/a
2000	The Great Gatsby	Television film based on the novel.	A&E Television Networks	A&E	—N/a
2016	The Last Tycoon	Television mini-series based on the novel.	Amazon Studios	Prime Video	44%

== List of portrayals ==
Year	Title	Portrayed By	Notes	Distributor	Rotten Tomatoes	Metacritic
1959	Beloved Infidel	Gregory Peck	Based on the memoirs of Sheilah Graham.	20th Century Fox	—N/a	—N/a
1974	Last of the Belles	Richard Chamberlain	A semi-fictional adaptation of Fitzgerald's story.	Titus Productions	—N/a	—N/a
1976	F. Scott Fitzgerald in Hollywood	Jason Miller	Television film.	Titus Productions	—N/a	—N/a
1993	Zelda	Timothy Hutton	Television movie by TNT	TNT	—N/a	—N/a
1994	Mrs. Parker and the Vicious Circle	Malcolm Gets	Focusing on the Algonquin Round Table	Miramax Films	—N/a	—N/a
2002	Last Call	Jeremy Irons	Detailing Fitzgerald's last years in Hollywood.	Showtime Networks	—N/a	—N/a
2011	Midnight in Paris	Tom Hiddleston	Supporting role	Sony Pictures Classics	93% (224 reviews)	81
2016	Z: The Beginning of Everything	David Hoflin	Based on the short story of the same name.	Amazon Studios	69% (39 reviews)	61
2016	Genius	Guy Pearce	Based on Max Perkins: Editor of Genius by A. Scott Berg.	Summit Entertainment	52% (111 reviews)	56

== See also ==
- Adaptations of The Great Gatsby
