= Boulting =

Boulting is an English language surname. Notable people with surname include:

- Crispian Boulting (born 1973), British musician
- Ingrid Boulting (born 1947), American model and actress
- John Boulting (1913–1985), British filmmaker
- Ned Boulting (born 1969), British journalist
- Roy Boulting (1913–2001), British filmmaker
- Sydney Boulting (1912–1998), British filmmaker
