= The Other Fellow =

The Other Fellow may refer to:

- The Other Fellow (1912 film), a 1912 American silent film
- The Other Fellow (2022 film), a 2022 documentary film about real men named James Bond
- The Other Fellow, an 1899 short story collection by Francis Hopkinson Smith
- The Other Fellow, an instructional film starring the actor Edgar Kennedy
- The Other Fellow, a name of a character in the play The Quare Fellow
