= The Clean Gun =

- Directed by: Harry Harvey
- Written by: Bar Moses (story); Leslie T. Peacocke
- Produced by: Falcon
- Starring: Stanley J. Preston
- Cinematography: Eddie Saunders
- Distributed by: General Film
- Release date: October 1917
- Running time: 4 reels
- Country: United States
- Language: Silent (English intertitles)

The Clean Gun is a 1917 silent film drama directed by Harry Harvey. It is preserved at the Library of Congress.

== Cast ==
- Stanley J. Preston - Jack Algers
- Edward Jobson - Dean Grayson
- Kathleen Kirkham - Matie Norton
- Robert Weycross - Senator Norton
- William Marshall - Edward Brantonx
- Harl McInroy - Doctor Bristow
- Charles Edler - Stephen Crawfield
- Louise Sothern - Della Markham
