= The Grip of Evil =

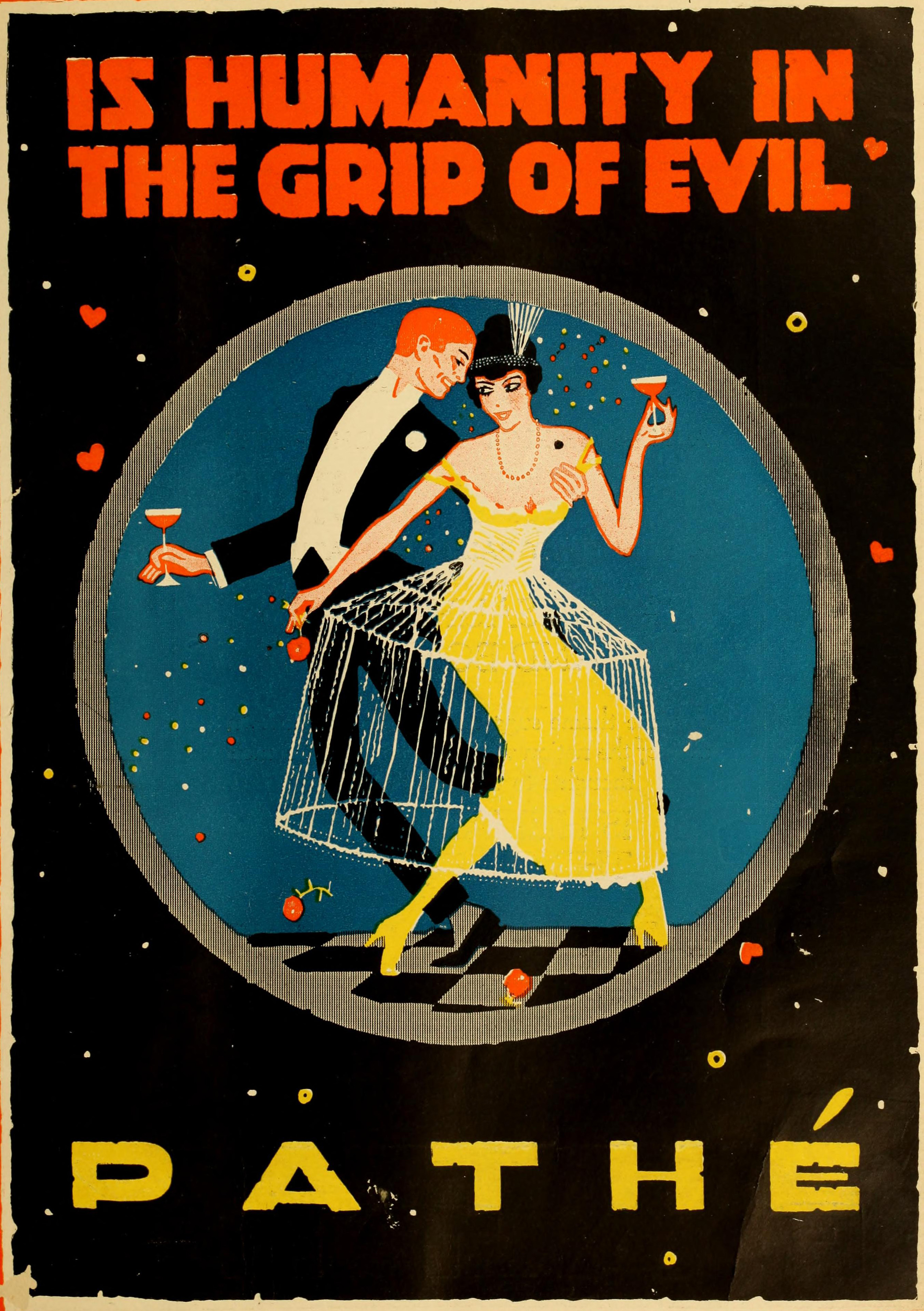
- Promotional poster
- Directed by: W.A.S. Douglas; Harry Harvey
- Written by: Douglas Bronston
- Story by: Louis Tracy
- Produced by: Balboa Amusement Producing Company; E. D. Horkheimer; H. M. Horkheimer
- Distributed by: Pathé Exchange
- Release date: July 17, 1916
- Running time: 14 chapters
- Country: United States
- Language: Silent (English intertitles)

The Grip of Evil is a lost 1916 American silent film serial directed by W.A.S. Douglas and Harry Harvey. It was distributed through Pathé Exchange. The melodramatic film serial was unusual in its critique of everyday habits and society and with episodes with unhappy endings.

== Cast ==
- Jackie Saunders as Jessie
- Roland Bottomley as John Burton
- Charles Dudley
- Gordon Sackville
- Philo McCullough
- Gloria Payton
- Myrtle Reeves
- Tom Morgan

== Chapter titles ==
1. Fate
2. The Underworld
3. The Upper Ten
4. The Looters
5. The Way of a Woman
6. The Hypocrites
7. The Butterflies
8. In Bohemia
9. The Dollar Kings
10. Down to the Sea
11. Mammon and Moloch
12. Into the Pit
13. Circumstantial Evidence
14. Humanity Triumphant
