= Midnight Flower =

American film

Midnight Flower is a 1923 film directed by Leslie T. Peacocke and starring Vola Vale and Gaston Glass. It was written by Florence Herrington from her story "The Love that Won Mary".

The plot involves an imprisoned woman who falls for a minister.

== Cast ==
- Vola Vale
- Gaston Glass
- Sheldon Johnson
- Tito Valentino
- Goldie Fessendo
- Al McKinnon
- Carmen de Cassan
- Margaret Diehl
