= Edward Jobson (actor) =

American actor

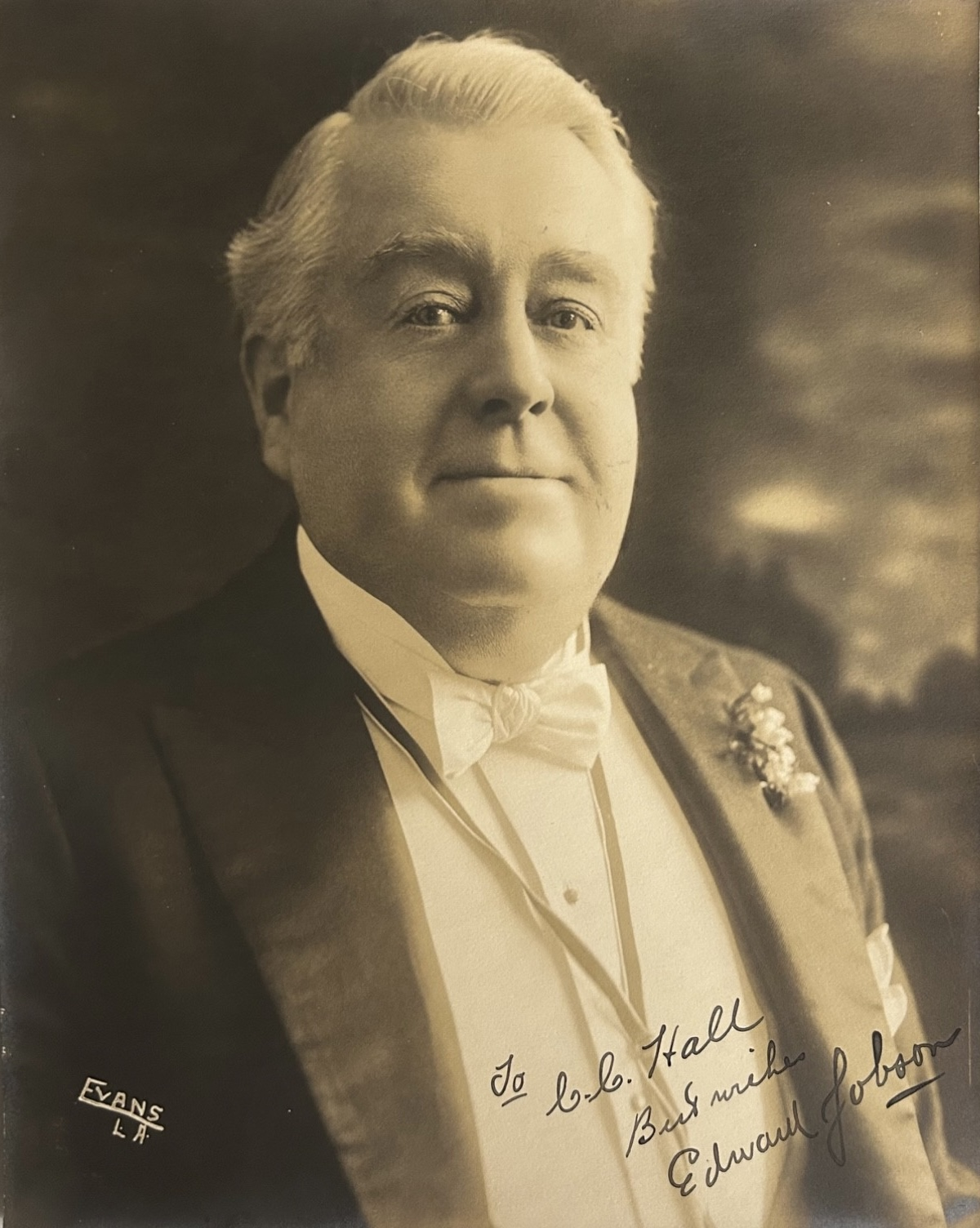
- Edward Jobson
- Born: February 29, 1860; Philadelphia, Pennsylvania, U.S.
- Died: February 7, 1925 (aged 64); San Jose, california, U.S.
- Occupation: Actor

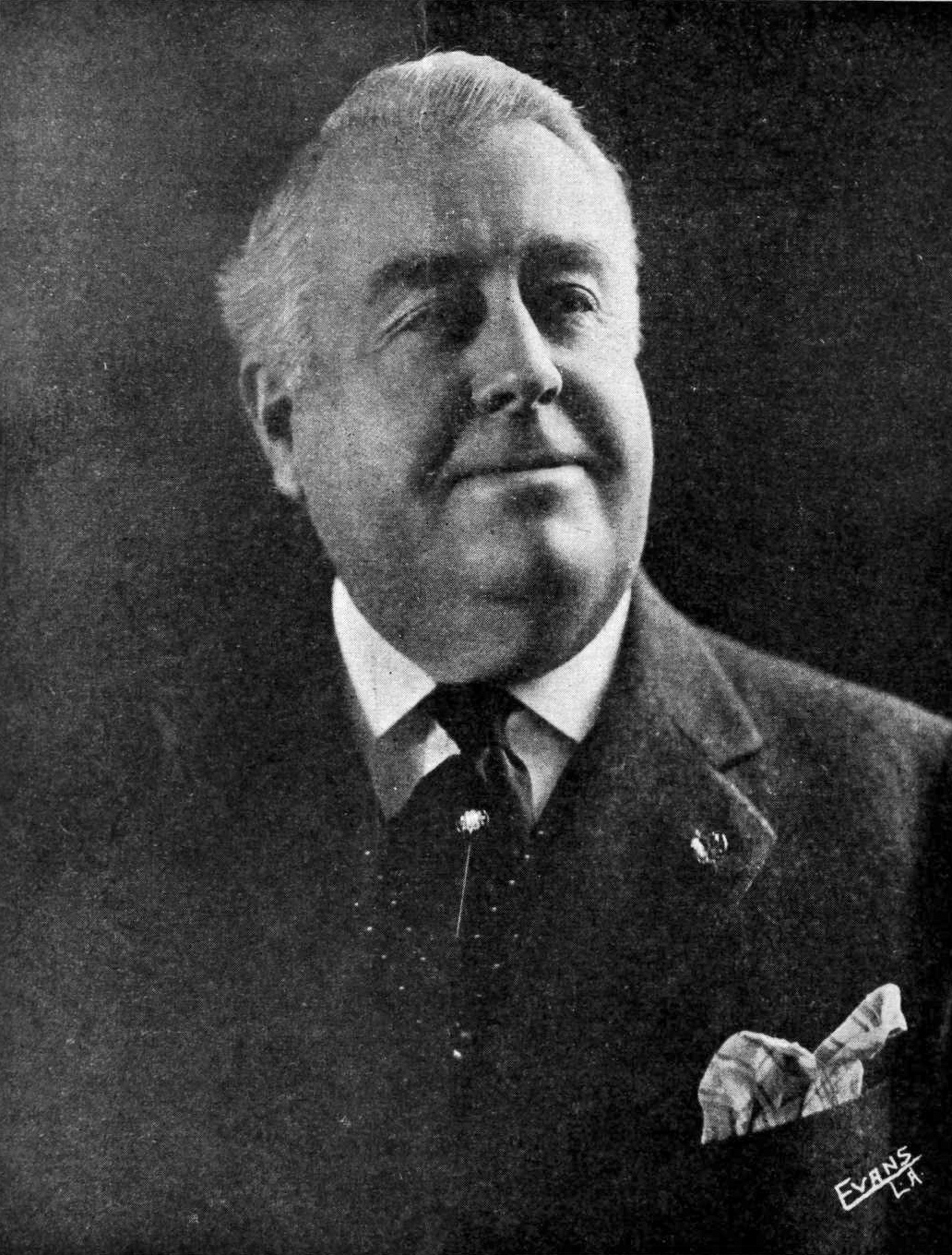
Jobson in 1922

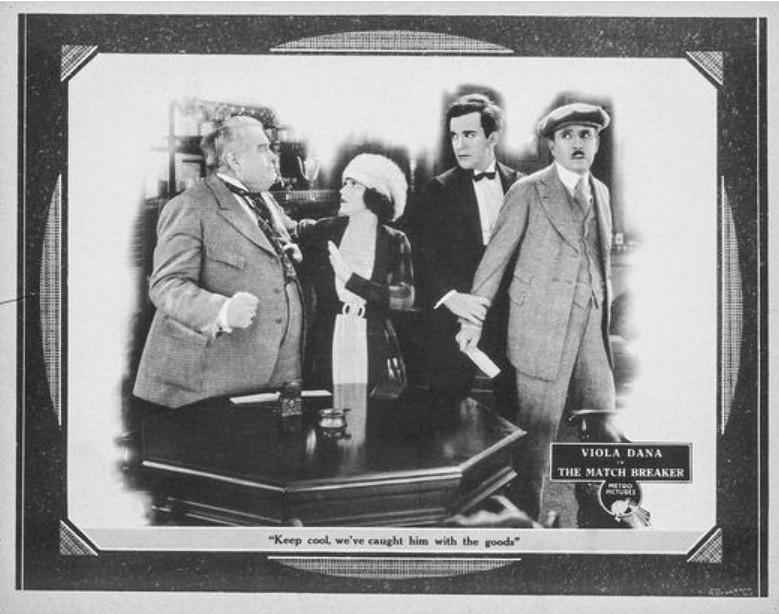
Lobby card showing Jobson (left) in The Match-Breaker (1921)

Edward Jobson (February 29, 1860 – February 7, 1925) was an American actor of stage and silent film. He started in silent films in his fifties. He had a sour yet sad bulldog demeanor and can be spotted in several surviving silent films. In The Delicious Little Devil (1919) he plays Rudolph Valentino's father, though the two actors looked nothing alike. He died at the beginning of 1925.

== Filmography ==
Film
Year	Title	Role	Notes
1912	Aunt Hetty's Goldfish		
1914	Wooing the Cook		Short film Credited as Eddie Jobson
1915	The Better Woman	Bart	Short film
1917	Twin Kiddies	Spencer	
1917	Sunny Jane	Philip Dwight	
1917	The Checkmate	Country Minister	
1917	A Bit of Kindling	Cyrus Van Hook	
1917	The Clean Gun	Dean Grayson	
1917	Feet of Clay	Alexander Greggson	
1917	Zollenstein	Johann Lesser	
1917	The Maternal Spark	Mills	Credited as Edwin Jobson
1917	Framing Framers	Addison Hale	
1918	The Argument	Chief Benton	
1918	The Midnight Trail	Benjaamin Thurston	
1918	Which Woman?	Cyrus W. Hopkins	
1918	No Children Wanted	Robert Chase	
1918	Miss Mischief Maker	James Wilson	
1918	A Hoosier Romance	The Squire	
1918	Wanted: A Brother	Officer Mulcahy	
1918	The Married Virgin	John McMillan	
1919	The Amazing Impostor	Plinius Plumm Plunkett	
1919	The Delicious Little Devil	Michael Calhoun	
1919	The Mints of Hell	Bill Weed	
1919	The Solitary Sin	Mr. Ralston	
1919	Cheating Herself	Magnus MacDonald	
1919	The Merry-Go-Round	Ezekial Powers	
1919	The Egg Crate Wallop	Constable	Credited as Ed Jobson
1919	Someone Must Pay	Malone	
1920	Pinto	Looey	
1920	Mrs. Temple's Telegram	Wigson	
1920	The City of Masks	Carr McFadden	
1920	The Chorus Girl's Romance	Dr. Tarbox	
1920	The Saphead	Reverend Murray Hilton	
1920	Someone in the House	Malone	
1920	Burning Daylight	Dowsett	
1921	The Off-Shore Pirate	Uncle John Farnam	
1921	The Match-Breaker	Thomas Butler Sr.	
1921	First Love	Peter Holliday	
1922	The Scrapper	Riley	
1922	Extra! Extra!	Alvin Stowe	
1922	Kisses	John Maynard	
1922	The Young Rajah	John Cabot	
1922	A Dangerous Game	Pete Sebastian	
1923	Brass	Judge Baldwin	
1923	Stepping Fast	Commodore Simpson	
1923	The Brass Bottle	Samuel Wackerbath	
1923	Tea: With a Kick!	Editor Octavius Juniper	
