= A Hoosier Romance =

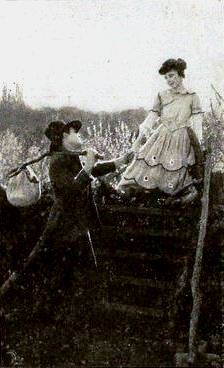
- Film still with McCoy and Moore
- Directed by: Colin Campbell
- Written by: Colin Campbell (scenario)
- Based on: A Hoosier Romance by James Whitcomb Riley
- Produced by: Selig Polyscope Co.
- Starring: Colleen Moore; Edward Jobson; Thomas Jefferson
- Cinematography: Harry Neumann
- Distributed by: Mutual Film Corp. Mutual Star Productions
- Release date: August 18, 1918
- Country: United States
- Languages: Silent; English intertitles

A Hoosier Romance is a 1918 Selig Polyscope silent film, featuring actress Colleen Moore.

== Plot ==
Pretty Patience Thompson, a "girl with a singing soul," lives with her cold-hearted and avaricious father, Jeff Thompson, on their Indiana farm. Her life of drudgery is brightened by John, the hired hand, but when he asks for her hand in marriage, the old man flies into a rage and discharges him. Soon an aged but wealthy widower courts Patience, and although she still loves John, "Old Jeff" orders her to marry the widower, claiming that a father's will is the law. Aware of her unhappiness, the kindly squire and his wife arrange for John to hide in the Thompson home on the day of the wedding. With all of the guests assembled, Patience runs from the room and pretends to escape on a horse, and while the two old men search the fields for her, she quietly marries John.

== Cast ==
- Colleen Moore - Patience Thompson
- Thomas Jefferson - Jeff Thompson
- Harry McCoy - John
- Edward Jobson - The squire
- Eugenie Besserer - The squire's wife
- Frank Hayes - The widower
- Billy Jacobs - Child

== Details ==
Filmed in California but set in Indiana, the film is based on a story by James Whitcomb Riley. In A Hoosier Romance, the author appeared posthumously as the narrator of the film, the material taken from previously shot images of him telling stories to children.
