= Last Call (2002 film) =

2002 television film by Henry Bromell

- DVD cover
- Based on: Against the Current: As I Remember F. Scott Fitzgerald by Frances Kroll Ring
- Written by: Henry Bromell
- Directed by: Henry Bromell
- Starring: Jeremy Irons; Neve Campbell; Sissy Spacek
- Music by: Brian Tyler
- Countries of origin: United States; Canada
- Original language: English

Production
- Executive producers: Helen Bartlett; Tony Bill; Henry Bromell
- Cinematography: Jeffrey Jur
- Editor: Neil Mandelberg
- Running time: 96 minutes
- Production companies: Showtime Entertainment; Room 520; Brainstorm Films

Original release
- Network: Showtime
- Release: May 25, 2002

Last Call is a 2002 biographical drama television film about the final years of American novelist F. Scott Fitzgerald. Written and directed by Henry Bromell, the film is based on the 1985 memoir Against the Current: As I Remember F. Scott Fitzgerald by Frances Kroll Ring. It stars Jeremy Irons as Fitzgerald, Neve Campbell as Ring, a young secretary who helps him with The Last Tycoon, and Sissy Spacek as his wife, Zelda.

An international co-production between the United States and Canada, the film premiered on Showtime on May 25, 2002. At the 54th Primetime Emmy Awards, it received two nominations: Outstanding Supporting Actress in a Miniseries or a Movie (for Spacek) and Outstanding Music Composition for a Miniseries, Movie or a Special (Dramatic Underscore). Bromell was nominated for Best Long Form – Adapted at the 55th Writers Guild of America Awards.

== Cast ==
- Jeremy Irons as F. Scott Fitzgerald
- Neve Campbell as Frances Kroll
- Sissy Spacek as Zelda Fitzgerald
- Shannon Lawson as Sarah Kroll
- Paul Hecht as Samuel Kroll
- Natalie Radford as Sheilah Graham
- Kathleen Munroe as Frances "Scottie" Fitzgerald Lanahan Smith
- Brian Paul as Dr. Mahoney
- Marium Carvell as Lucy
- Jonas Chernick as Warren Nagler
- Roman Podhora as Bartender
- Edie Inksetter as Mailclerk
- Eve Crawford as Librarian
- David Clement as Waiter
- John Ford as Maxwell Perkins

== Reception ==
Neil Genzlinger of The New York Times described Last Call as "an affecting study, both of a novelist struggling to regain his form and of the gantlet run by anyone trying to cope with an alcoholic." Laura Fries of Variety called the film "an engaging, sleepy project that gathers steam with each passing scene" and commented, "[Bromell's] script reveals a truly touching interpersonal relationship, but it's heavily veiled with sentimental affection." John Leonard of New York Magazine noted, "Irons is an excellent, if an unlikely, Fitzgerald, with just the right amount of frayed charm and damaged curiosity." Conversely, Howard Rosenberg of the Los Angeles Times wrote, "Last Call is as aimless as the moneyed class [Fitzgerald] so often depicted, and Irons' Fitzgerald as bogus as Jay Gatsby while padding around in his bathrobe and yielding to spurts of inspiration between those fantasies with Zelda."
