= Ingrid Boulting =

American actress, model and yoga teacher (born 1947)

- Born: 1947 (age 78–79); Transvaal, Union of South Africa
- Occupations: actress, Model, ballerina

Ingrid Boulting (born in Transvaal, Union of South Africa in 1947) is an actress and model, daughter of actress turned fashion model Enid Munnik (later Enid Boulting from her 2nd marriage in 1951) step-daughter of English film-maker Roy Boulting and step-niece of John Boulting and Sydney Boulting a.k.a. Peter Cotes. Boulting was brought up from age two to nine by her grand-parents when her mother moved to London in 1949 to start a career as one of the most successful fashion models of the 1950s and early 1960s. Ingrid moved to England aged 9 and trained as a ballet dancer at the Royal Ballet School in Richmond. At Ballet School, aged 15, Ingrid was photographed by Bob Willoughby and appeared on the cover of Queen magazine (October 1962) as a student ballerina. She embarked on an acting career at the Oxford Playhouse, had minor roles in British Films and later became a fashion model. In a memorable photograph by Sarah Moon she became a Biba shop poster subject. In 1976, Boulting starred in The Last Tycoon, the last film directed by famed director Elia Kazan, written by Harold Pinter based on F. Scott Fitzgerald's Hollywood novel The Last Tycoon, and produced by Sam Spiegel.

== Modeling ==
Boulting was the face of Biba Cosmetics on the 1968 poster designed by Steve Thomas and photographed by Sarah Moon for Barbara Hulanicki's store Biba in London – the face behind black lace net veil looming out of darkness. Boulting appeared on four British Vogue covers including three by David Bailey and one by Norman Parkinson.

== Movies ==
- The Witches (1966) (billed as Ingrid Brett)
- The Jokers (1967) (billed as Ingrid Brett)
- Inadmissible Evidence (1968) (billed as Ingrid Brett)
- The Last Roman (1968/69)
- The Last Tycoon (1976)
- Conversations with God (2006)

== Current life and career ==
Boulting is an artist and yoga instructor in Ojai, California. She is the founder and owner of Sacred Space Studio.
