= His Neighbor's Wife =

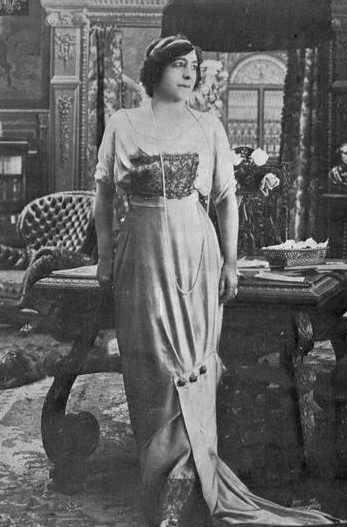
- A scene of Lillie Langtry in the film
- Directed by: Edwin S. Porter
- Produced by: Adolph Zukor
- Starring: Lillie Langtry
- Release date: October 1913
- Running time: 19 minutes
- Country: USA
- Languages: Silent; English intertitles

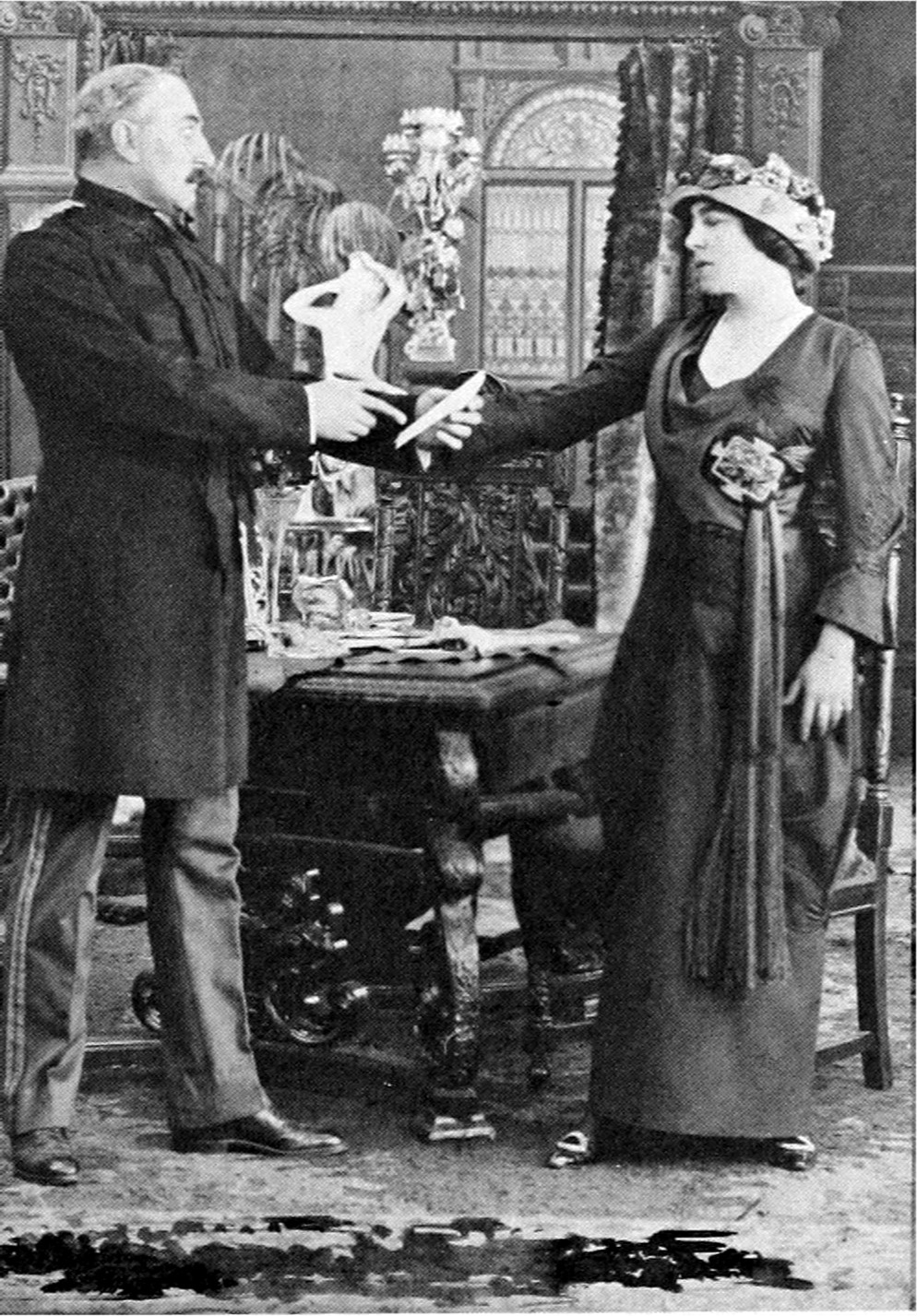
Langtry and Leslie T. Peacocke in scene.

His Neighbor's Wife is a 1913 silent short film directed by Edwin S. Porter and starring Victorian actress and celebrity Lillie Langtry in her only feature screen appearance. It was produced by Adolph Zukor's Famous Players Film Company and distributed on a State's Rights basis.

== Cast ==
- Lillie Langtry - Mrs. Norton
- Sidney Mason - Mr. Norton
- Mimi Yvonne - The Norton Child
- Leslie T. Peacocke - Captain Roberts

== See also ==
- Edwin S. Porter filmography
