= The Witches (1966 film) =

1966 British film by Cyril Frankel

- Theatrical release poster
- Directed by: Cyril Frankel
- Screenplay by: Nigel Kneale
- Based on: The Devil's Own; 1960 novel by Norah Lofts
- Produced by: Anthony Nelson Keys
- Starring: Joan Fontaine; Kay Walsh; Alec McCowen; Ann Bell; Ingrid Boulting (billed as Ingrid Brett)
- Cinematography: Arthur Grant
- Edited by: Chris Barnes; James Needs
- Music by: Richard Rodney Bennett
- Production companies: Hammer Film Productions; Seven Arts Productions
- Distributed by: Associated British-Pathé
- Release dates: 9 December 1966 (UK); 15 March 1967 (United States)
- Running time: 91 minutes
- Country: United Kingdom
- Language: English

The Witches (U.S. title: The Devil's Own) is a 1966 British horror film directed by Cyril Frankel and starring Joan Fontaine, Alec McCowen, Kay Walsh, Ann Bell, Ingrid Boulting and Gwen Ffrangcon-Davies. Made by Hammer Films, it was adapted by Nigel Kneale from the 1960 novel The Devil's Own by Norah Lofts (as Peter Curtis). This was the final theatrical film role for Fontaine, who continued to act in television productions.

== Plot ==
Schoolteacher Gwen Mayfield comes back to England after suffering a nervous breakdown caused by an attack by witch-doctors while working in a mission in Africa. She is hired by the wealthy Reverend Alan Bax, who runs a school in the remote village of Heddaby. Once there, Gwen finds out Alan is not actually a minister and only wears a clerical collar out of "a sense of security"; the only church in the village is in ruins. Meanwhile, she befriends Alan's sister, an esteemed journalist.

The romance between two of Gwen's pupils, Ronnie Dowsett and Linda Rigg, is sternly opposed by adults in the village for reasons Gwen cannot understand. Linda lives with her grandmother, Granny Rigg, who is rumoured to be a witch and who Ronnie fears is abusing Linda.

As Ronnie is a gifted pupil, Alan proposes to pay for his stay at a prep school outside the village, but the boy's father is against it. Gwen volunteers to tutor the boy. Ronnie gives Linda a male doll as a mate to her female one, to represent them as a couple. The next day, Ronnie falls into a coma, and Gwen finds the male doll with pins stuck through it and its head missing. She shows it to Stephanie, who indicates someone might be dabbling in witchcraft. Impressed by Gwen's knowledge of magical practices in Africa, Stephanie invites her to co-author an article about witchcraft in contemporary England.

Ronnie's superstitious mother becomes upset when Gwen asks her about Ronnie's state. Later, she goes to Granny Rigg's house to work out a deal. The next day, Ronnie is out of the coma and is quickly taken by his mother to stay with her relatives in Wales. Ronnie's father confronts Granny Rigg about it and is later found drowned in a nearby pond.

Gwen starts to think people who believe themselves to be witches are behind these incidents, and realizes that if they are trying to keep Ronnie apart from Linda, it could mean they might be planning to sacrifice her as a virgin. She announces her willingness to testify at the inquest into Ronnie's father's death. Following an injury caused by Stephanie's dogs, Gwen is taken to the Baxes' home where she is treated by the local doctor. During the night, she gets frightened by the sudden appearance of an African totem, and suffers another nervous breakdown.

Months later, Gwen is recovering in a nursing home with no recollection of ever leaving Africa. After a visiting little girl's doll triggers the return of her memories, she escapes the hospital and hitchhikes back to Heddaby, where she is welcomed to stay at the Baxes' again. One of the villagers whispers to her that Linda, supposedly on holiday at her cousin's, has actually been taken by the witches.

One night, Gwen sees from the Baxes' window a group of people scurrying toward the ruined church, and goes to investigate, finding a witches' coven led by Stephanie, who reveals she had planned to initiate Gwen into their ranks. Stephanie explains that she has learned a ritual that extends life through the ritual sacrifice of a pure maiden, which is planned for the next night, Lammastide. The place of sacrifice is to be kept spiritually clean or the power of the ritual will turn upon the witch. Unable to find where they are hiding Linda, Gwen waits for the ceremony. Linda is there but in a trance, unable to assist in her own rescue. As Stephanie raises the ritual knife to kill the girl, Gwen cuts herself and smears her blood on Stephanie's robe, defiling it. Seized with convulsions, Stephanie tries to remove her soiled garb, but falls dead.

Weeks later, freed of Stephanie's influence, Heddaby has returned to normal. Gwen chooses to stay and work as a schoolteacher for Alan.

== Cast ==
- Joan Fontaine as Gwen Mayfield
- Kay Walsh as Stephanie Bax
- Alec McCowen as Alan Bax
- Ann Bell as Sally Benson
- Ingrid Boulting as Linda Rigg (credited as Ingrid Brett)
- John Collin as Dowsett
- Michele Dotrice as Valerie Creek
- Gwen Ffrangcon-Davies as Granny Rigg
- Duncan Lamont as Bob Curd
- Leonard Rossiter as Dr. Wallis
- Martin Stephens as Ronnie Dowsett
- Carmel McSharry as Mrs. Dowsett
- Viola Keats as Mrs. Curd
- Shelagh Fraser as Mrs. Creek
- Bryan Marshall as Tom

== Production ==
The village of Hambleden, Buckinghamshire, was the filming location for the fictional village of Heddaby. Interiors were filmed at Hammer's usual studio at Bray in the same year that the famous horror film company vacated their home altogether for (mainly) Elstree and Pinewood. The cast featured child-actor Martin Stephens, then 17. The supporting cast also included Hammer regular Duncan Lamont, as well as John Collin, Michele Dotrice, Leonard Rossiter and Bryan Marshall. The score was by Richard Rodney Bennett.

== Critical reception ==
The Monthly Film Bulletin wrote: "After a crude opening sequence of poor Joan Fontaine being frightened out of her wits by a prancing witch-doctor in an African hut, this very enjoyable thriller settles down more calmly to make good use of Nigel Kneale's highly literate script (although one would have liked to hear more about Kay Walsh's post-immortality plans). Bernard Robinson and Don Mingaye have provided their usual excellent sets – notably the pseudo-clergyman's study, arranged as a private church complete with religious statuary and taped organ music – and the atmosphere of horror is cunningly built up out of the tranquil village landscapes: the children rehearsing a home-made pageant under a tree where a headless doll lies propped among the branches; the rose-covered cottage where Granny Rigg mutters marching orders to her cat; the flock of sheep driven across the tell-tale footprints at the edge of the lake by a pair of Alsatians. If Cyril Frankel's direction is a little flat, it is at least tasteful, and the necessary note of extravagance is provided by Kay Walsh (outstanding in a good cast), suddenly blossoming forth in a horned headdress and full black magic regalia to croon Latin imprecations over her victim."

Variety called the film "routine entertainment". The Hammer Story: The Authorised Biography of Hammer Films called the film "unsettling, though compromised by a hysterical climax", writing, "when The Witches strikes the right balance it ultimately succeeds as an engrossing thriller, even if it ultimately disappoints as Hammer horror."

The Radio Times Guide to Films gave the film 3/5 stars, writing: "Hollywood stars never faded, they simply made films in Britain. Joan Fontaine here reprises her "frightened lady" turn, first seen in Rebecca [1940] as the cursed schoolmistress discovering devil worship in rural parts. It's a Hammer that never quite makes contact with your nerves, even though it's written by Nigel Kneale, who created Quatermass. At least director Cyril Frankel treats it as though it mattered, but for Fontaine it signalled her big screen career's end."

== See also ==
- List of films about witchcraft
