= Frances Kroll Ring =

Secretary to writer F. Scott Fitzgerald (1916–2015)

Frances Kroll Ring (May 17, 1916 – June 18, 2015) was the last secretary and personal assistant to F. Scott Fitzgerald before his death.

== Biography ==
Ring worked for Fitzgerald for 20 months in 1939 and 1940. She typed drafts of The Last Tycoon and served as a sounding board as he worked on the story; she also did the same for two other projects he was working on, the Pat Hobby stories and a screenplay based on his story “Babylon Revisited.”

Ring wrote that she paid Dr. Clarence H. Nelson's bill ($25) after Fitzgerald's death. Fitzgerald had consulted Dr. Nelson complaining of “aches around the elbow and shoulder. . . whenever I have had a great orgy of cokes or coffee." On Feb 7, 1940, Fitzgerald wrote to Dr. Nelson, telling him that he was not drinking and would pay his medical bill soon. Fitzgerald died suddenly of a myocardial infarct in the apartment of Sheilah Graham, December 21, 1940, 5:15 pm, and Dr. Nelson signed the death certificate. Ring selected a gray casket for Fitzgerald's burial.

In 1985, Ring published a memoir titled Against the Current: As I Remember F. Scott Fitzgerald; the title is from the last sentence in Fitzgerald's The Great Gatsby - "So we beat on, boats against the current, borne back ceaselessly into the past." The memoir was eventually made into a movie, Last Call, starring Jeremy Irons as Fitzgerald and Neve Campbell as young Frances Kroll. Kroll has a cameo appearance as her older self in the closing scene of the movie where she is looking in a bookstore window. Ring was also the editor of the Automobile Club of Southern California's Westways magazine, and brought some of the best writers of the time to it, including Anaïs Nin and Wallace Stegner. She also worked as a story reader for Paramount and a book reviewer.
