= The Other Fellow (1912 film) =

1912 American silent film

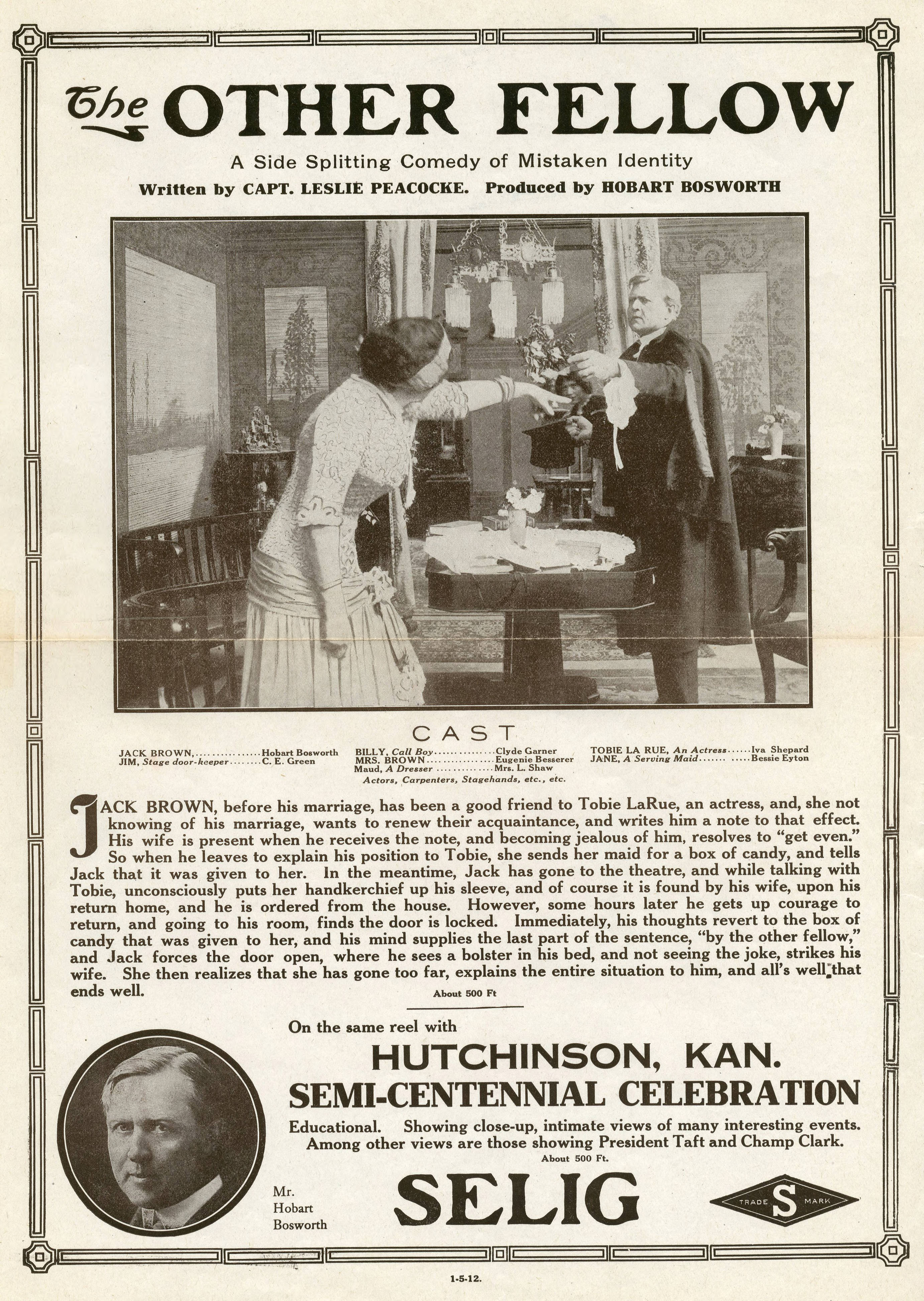

The Other Fellow is an American silent film directed by Hobart Bosworth who also starred in the movie. It was released on January 5, 1912. Made by the Selig Polyscope Company, it used a story by Leslie T. Peacocke. In addition to Bosworth in the role of Jack Brown, the cast included Eugenie Besserer as Mrs. Brown, Clay M. Greene (billed as C. E. Green) as Jim, Iva Shepard as Tobie La Rue, Bessie Eyton as Jane, Clyde Garner as Billy, and Mrs. L. Shaw as Maud.

== Plot ==
Jack Brown has recently married. He and Mrs. Brown are content, until Jack receives an amorous letter from the actress Tobie La Rue, a former friend of his whom he has not spoken to in a long time. Tobie, unaware of Jack's marriage, did not intend to cause problems in the Brown family, but her note creates envy in Mrs Brown and she resolves to punish her husband for the letter. When Jack leaves to meet Tobie, Mrs. Brown sends her made out to get her a box of candy. When Jack gets home she lies to him and tells him the box was sent to her by an admirer. Thus begins a chain of a comedy of errors in which both Mr. and Mrs. Brown are jealous of a rival who does not in reality exist. Eventually the truth comes out and all ends well.
