= Head and Shoulders (short story) =

1920 short story by F. Scott Fitzgerald

- Short story by F. Scott Fitzgerald
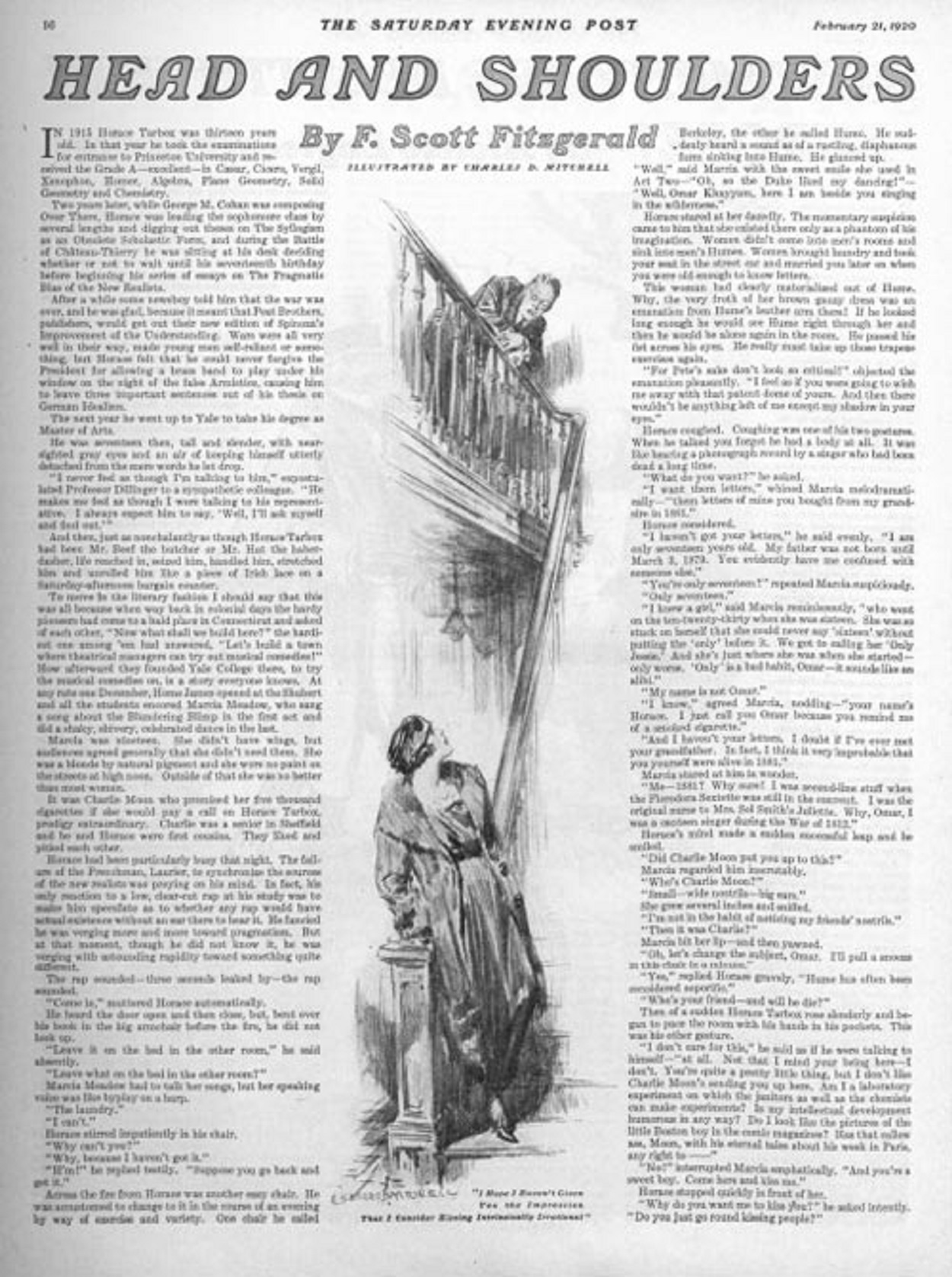
- The story as it appeared in the February 21, 1920 issue of the Saturday Evening Post

Text available at Wikisource
- Country: United States
- Language: English
- Genre: Short story

Publication
- Published in: Saturday Evening Post
- Publication type: Periodical
- Publisher: Curtis Publishing Company
- Media type: Print (Magazine, Hardback & Paperback)
- Publication date: February 21, 1920

"Head and Shoulders" is a short story by American writer F. Scott Fitzgerald. Written in November 1919, it was Fitzgerald's first story to be published in The Saturday Evening Post, with the help of his new literary agent, Harold Ober. The Post paid $400 for the story. The story appeared in the February 21, 1920 issue and was illustrated by Charles D. Mitchell. It later appeared in his short story collection Flappers and Philosophers.

The story follows a young prodigy at Princeton who falls for a spirited dancer in spite of himself. The same year it was adapted into a silent film The Chorus Girl's Romance starring Viola Dana as Marcia Meadows and Gareth Hughes as Horace Tarbox.

== Plot summary ==
Horace Tarbox is a young and prospective intellectual, completely absorbed in his studies. Marcia shows up at his door one day (the "rap" alluded to in the story's ending) and takes to showing Horace another side of life. It quickly snowballs into an improbable pairing between a philosopher and an actress.

Marcia talks Horace into watching her in the Varsity Show, and he finds emotions and appreciation for a beautiful woman. She returns the affection, being drawn to their connection as "infant prodigies", as she calls them. The story concludes as a role reversal of the two characters, for the better or for the worse, as Horace becomes a successful entertainer using gymnastics and Marcia becomes a successful writer.

The title comes from Marcia's idea that she represents the shoulders as a "chorus girl" known for shaking her shoulders during her dance routine in order to support the couple, and Horace as the head for all the ideas and thinking. Towards the end of the story, this dynamic reverses: Horace's athletic shoulders financially supporting Marcia's writing, as she becomes the supposed "head" or thinker in the family, as an acclaimed writer.

== Critical analysis ==
=== Themes ===
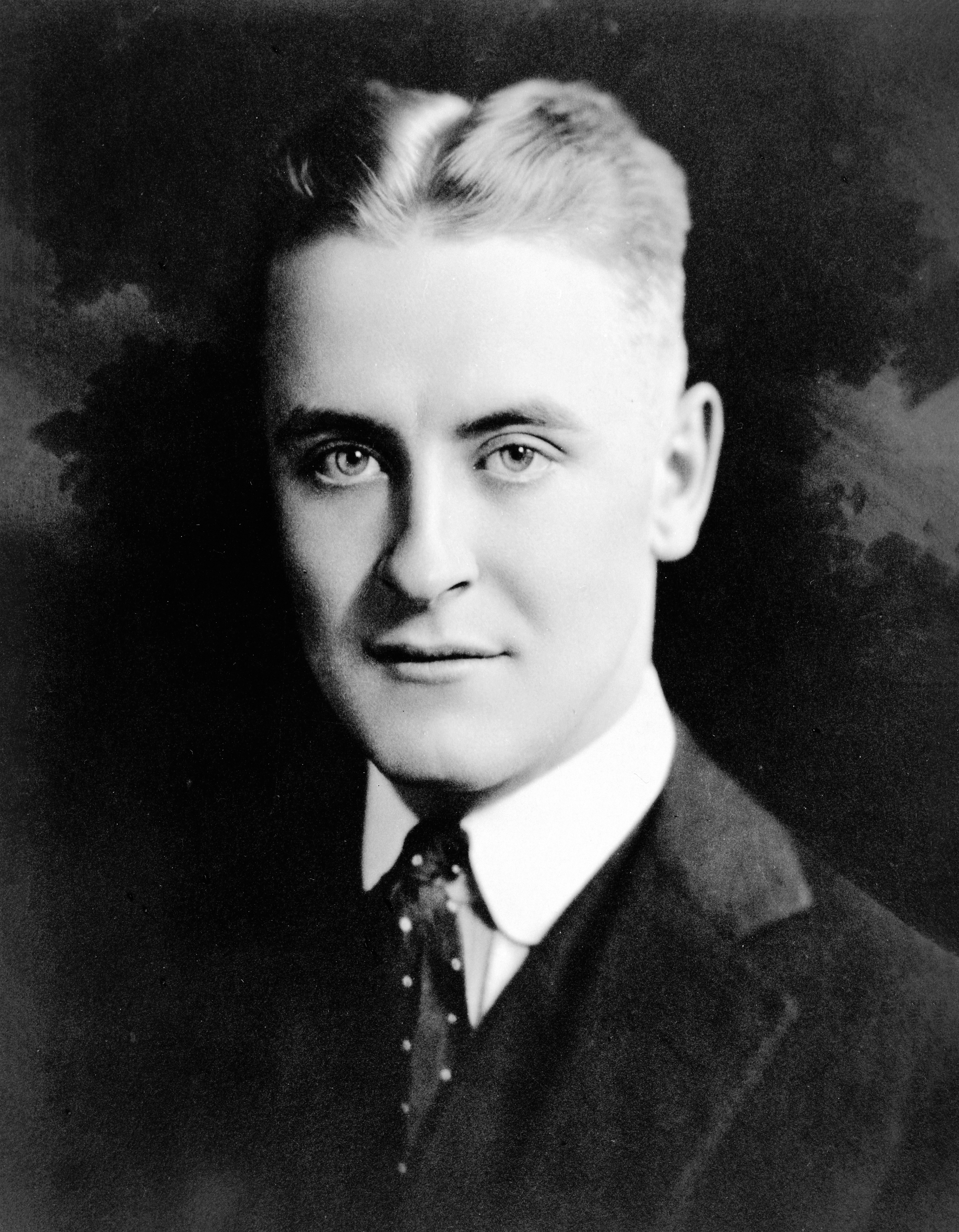
F. Scott Fitzgerald

Fitzgerald weaves in several themes that he would later hone—and become famous for—in his short stories and novels. One of his recurring themes is the odd matching of love interests, of people not supposed to find love with each other, as in the novel The Great Gatsby. But in the short story the mismatch is hopeful. Horace is from the intellectual elite, born and bred to think instead of live. Marcia represents the adventures of life, the passion of art and a steaming sexuality.

The second major theme is the adjustment of a career goal for love, especially in the beginning stages of romance, which would be taken up again in the novel Tender is the Night. Horace admits to having trouble thinking with the idea of Marcia in his head. That sense builds until he finds himself being consumed by passion.

The third major theme is the mildly-bitter end. At the end of the short story, Horace says that he should not have answered the door. He has given up something for romance: Marcia has gained fame from it. This anticipates Fitzgerald's dispute with his wife, Zelda, who he thought kept him from writing more and better. "I always felt a story in the [Saturday Evening] Post was tops", Zelda later recalled, "But Scott couldn't stand to write them."
