= The Chorus Girl's Romance =

1920 silent film

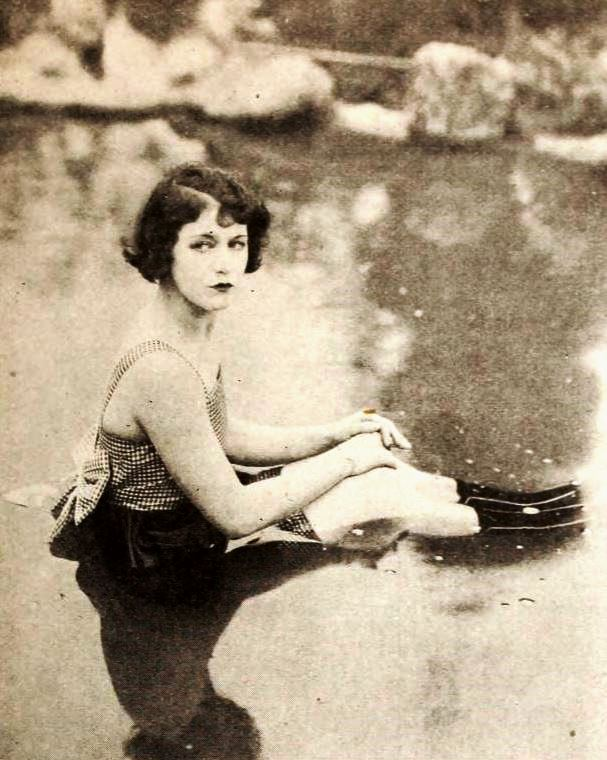
- Still with Dana
- Directed by: William C. Dowlan
- Written by: Percy Heath
- Based on: "Head and Shoulders" by F. Scott Fitzgerald
- Starring: Viola Dana; Gareth Hughes; William Quinn
- Cinematography: John Arnold
- Production company: Metro Pictures
- Distributed by: Metro Pictures
- Release date: August 6, 1920
- Running time: 60 minutes
- Country: United States
- Language: Silent (English intertitles)

The Chorus Girl's Romance is a 1920 American silent comedy film directed by William C. Dowlan and starring Viola Dana, Gareth Hughes, and William Quinn. It is based on the 1920 short story "Head and Shoulders" by F. Scott Fitzgerald.

A print of this film is preserved at Cinemateca Brasileira, in São Paulo, Brazil.

== Cast ==
- Viola Dana as Marcia Meadows
- Gareth Hughes as Horace Tarbox
- Phil Ainsworth as Steve Reynolds
- William Quinn as P.P. Anderson
- Jere Sundin as Betty Darrell
- Sidney De Gray as Fred Ward
- Lawrence Grant as Jose Brasswine
- Tom Gallery as Charlie Moon
- Edward Jobson as Dr. Tarbox
- Martin Best as F.W. Jordon
- Anne Schaefer as Aunt Emma
- Dorothy Gordon as Miss Wilson
- William V. Mong as Professor Dillinger

== Bibliography ==
- Goble, Alan. The Complete Index to Literary Sources in Film. Walter de Gruyter, 1999.
