= The Last Tycoon (1976 film) =

1976 American romance film by Elia Kazan

- Theatrical release poster by Richard Amsel
- Directed by: Elia Kazan
- Screenplay by: Harold Pinter
- Based on: The Last Tycoon; 1941 novel by F. Scott Fitzgerald
- Produced by: Sam Spiegel
- Starring: Robert De Niro; Tony Curtis; Robert Mitchum; Jeanne Moreau; Jack Nicholson; Donald Pleasence; Ray Milland; Dana Andrews; Ingrid Boulting
- Cinematography: Victor J. Kemper
- Edited by: Richard Marks
- Music by: Maurice Jarre
- Production companies: Academy Pictures Corporation; Gelderse Maatschappij N.V.
- Distributed by: Paramount Pictures
- Release date: November 17, 1976
- Running time: 123 minutes
- Country: United States
- Language: English
- Budget: $5.5 million
- Box office: $1.8 million

The Last Tycoon is a 1976 American period romantic drama film directed by Elia Kazan and produced by Sam Spiegel, based on Harold Pinter's screenplay adaptation of F. Scott Fitzgerald's unfinished novel The Last Tycoon. It stars Robert De Niro and features Tony Curtis, Robert Mitchum, Jack Nicholson, Donald Pleasence, Jeanne Moreau, Theresa Russell and Ingrid Boulting.

The film is the second collaboration between Kazan and Spiegel, who worked together to make On the Waterfront (1954). Fitzgerald based the novel's protagonist Monroe Stahr on film producer Irving Thalberg. Spiegel was awarded the Irving G. Thalberg Memorial Award.

The Last Tycoon did not receive the critical acclaim that much of Kazan's earlier work had received, but it was nominated for an Academy Award for Best Art Direction (Gene Callahan, Jack T. Collis and Jerry Wunderlich).

The story was Fitzgerald's last, unfinished novel, as well as the last film that Kazan directed.

== Plot ==
Monroe Stahr is the young production chief and the most creative executive at one of the biggest studios during the Golden Age of Hollywood. Stahr's public recognition is coveted by Pat Brady, an older movie producer. From a distance, Stahr supervises the production of a film, and watches Didi, an older actress, have creative differences with director Red Ridingwood. As Stahr critiques the dailies, an earthquake erupts and bursts a water pipe inside the water tower, which floods a nearby set. During the commotion, Stahr glances at two women who are desperately clinging to the head of a statue; one of them is a young woman, Kathleen Moore. Stahr returns to his mansion and asks his secretary to identify the women.

Back at his studio office, Stahr is greeted by Cecilia Brady, Pat's college-aged daughter. After Cecilia leaves, Stahr confides his support for Rodriguez, an actor who is in the midst of separating from his wife. Later that day, Stahr attends a luncheon at which the studio board discusses a potential writers' strike and the studio's profitability. As he arranges to meet Kathleen later that night, he consoles Didi in her dressing room.

As Stahr leaves the studio, he meets Edna, an aspiring actress, although she is not the girl whom he wished to see. However, Edna asks to be dropped off at her Westwood home, where Stahr meets Kathleen, an Anglo-Irish aspiring actress. The next day, Stahr consults with George Boxley, an English novelist on contract to the studio who thinks that movies are beneath him. To inspire Boxley, Stahr tells an impromptu story in which a woman enters a room and empties the contents of her purse on a table. Boxley asks about an unresolved element in the story, a nickel spilled from the woman's purse, to which Stahr tells Boxley that the nickel is for the movies.

At a screenwriters' dinner party, Stahr unexpectedly sees Kathleen again and dances with her. Kathleen leaves before long, but they agree to see each other the following morning. There, they walk around the building site of Stahr's unfinished beachfront house. They return to the beach that night, and, as they are having sex, Kathleen deduces that she resembles Minna Davis, Stahr's deceased wife. After Stahr brings her home, he finds that Kathleen has mailed him a letter, stating that she has been engaged to another man.

At the studio, Stahr confronts Boxley and has him escorted off the lot. Despite Kathleen's note urging him not to see her, she and Stahr return to the beach, where she states her intentions to marry an engineer who saved her life. Back in the projection room, Stahr is displeased with a newly filmed scene between Didi and Rodriguez and decides to rewrite the scene after learning that Boxley has died by suicide. Didi's new film premieres, and Stahr receives a telegram from Kathleen, stating that she is marrying at noon.

Meanwhile, Cecilia arranges a meeting between Stahr and Brimmer, a communist labor organizer hoping to unionize Hollywood screenwriters. Stahr disagrees with having the screenwriters unionize, stating that they can share money but not power. During dinner, Stahr drinks heavily as Brimmer and Cecilia flirt. They return to Cecilia's place, where Stahr and Brimmer play a hostile game of ping-pong. Stahr attempts to fight Brimmer, but Brimmer easily knocks him out. Throughout the night, Cecilia cares for Stahr.

The next morning, Brady tells Stahr that he has called an emergency meeting. Stahr arrives with a bruised eye, and is informed by the New York office that he has been relieved from further labor negotiations, and they suggest that he take a vacation. He goes into his office but is flooded by memories in which he envisions Kathleen as the girl in the story that he told to Boxley, spilling a nickel from her purse. As Brady and the studio executives drive away, Stahr walks alone into a dark and silent sound stage.

== Cast ==
- Robert De Niro as Monroe Stahr
- Tony Curtis as Rodriguez
- Robert Mitchum as Pat Brady
- Jeanne Moreau as Didi
- Jack Nicholson as Brimmer
- Donald Pleasence as George Boxley
- Ray Milland as Fleishacker
- Dana Andrews as Red Ridingwood
- Ingrid Boulting as Kathleen Moore
- Peter Strauss as Wylie White
- Theresa Russell as Cecilia Brady
- Tige Andrews as Popolos
- Morgan Farley as Marcus
- John Carradine as Tour guide
- Jeff Corey as Doctor
- Diane Shalet as Stahr's secretary
- Seymour Cassel as Seal trainer
- Anjelica Huston as Edna

== Production ==
On November 10, 1976, the Los Angeles Times reported that Spiegel, Pinter and Kazan spent three years bringing the film to the screen, including two years working on the script. On November 14, 1976, The New York Times reported that some scenes in the film were almost verbatim from Fitzgerald's book, but Pinter and Kazan took several liberties with the story.

On November 10, 1976, Variety reported that the film was initially rated R, but the decision was overturned during an appeal and changed to PG.

== Reception ==
On the review aggregator website Rotten Tomatoes, 33% of 27 critics' reviews are positive. Metacritic, which uses a weighted average, assigned the film a score of 57 out of 100, based on 11 critics, indicating "mixed or average" reviews.

Vincent Canby of The New York Times wrote, "None of the changes that Mr. Pinter has made in the novel seem to me to damage the style or mood of the book. More than any other screen adaptation of a Fitzgerald work—with the exception of Joan Micklin Silver's fine adaptation of the short story Bernice Bobs Her Hair—The Last Tycoon preserves original feeling and intelligence. The movie is full of echoes. We watch it as if at a far remove from what's happening, but that too is appropriate: Fitzgerald was writing history as it happened."

Variety felt that "The Last Tycoon is a handsome and lethargic film, based on F. Scott Fitzgerald's unfinished Hollywood novel of the 1930s, as adapted by Harold Pinter. Producer Sam Spiegel's contribution is admirable, but Elia Kazan's direction of the Pinter plot seems unfocused though craftsmanlike. Robert De Niro's performance as the inscrutable boy-wonder of films is mildly intriguing."

Charles Champlin of the Los Angeles Times called the film "unusually disappointing", writing that "[s]ubtlety has never been Elia Kazan's style as director", and felt that Pinter's script "is cynical if not actively sinister, more apt to deal with the death of love than the flowering of romance".

Pauline Kael of The New Yorker called the film "bewildering mute and inexpressive" as she criticized the romantic subplot, writing that "every time Ingrid Boulting appears onscreen the picture comes to halt", and was critical of Pinter's script revisions.
