= The Off-Shore Pirate =

1921 film by Dallas M. Fitzgerald

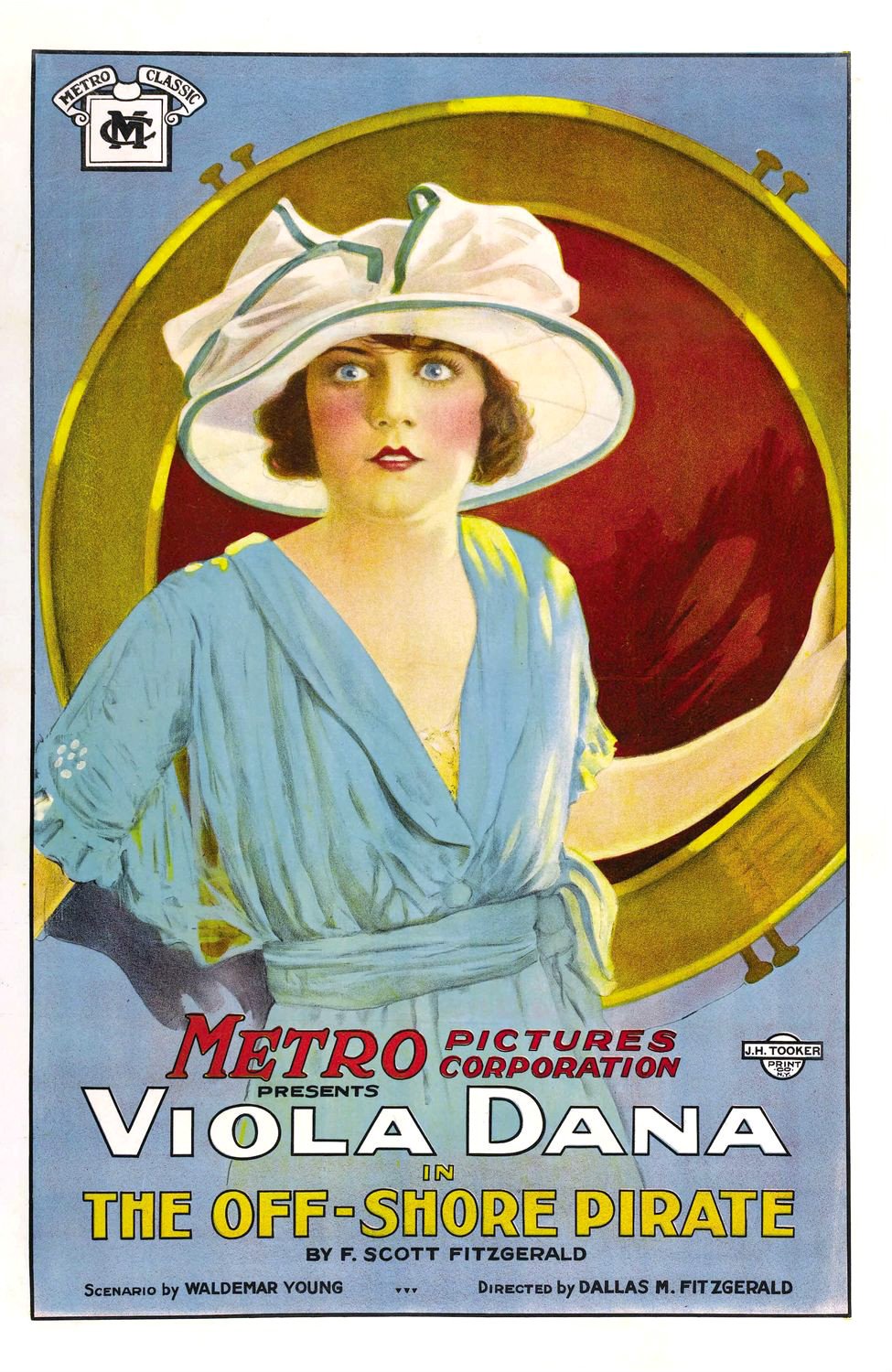
- Theatrical one-sheet release poster
- Directed by: Dallas Fitzgerald; Albert H. Kelley (assistant director)
- Written by: Waldemar Young (scenario)
- Based on: "The Offshore Pirate" by F. Scott Fitzgerald
- Starring: Viola Dana; Jack Mulhall
- Cinematography: John Arnold; Lieutenant Joseph Waddell (additional photography)
- Production company: Metro Pictures
- Distributed by: Metro Pictures
- Release date: January 31, 1921 (U.S.)
- Running time: 6 reels
- Country: United States
- Language: Silent (English intertitles)

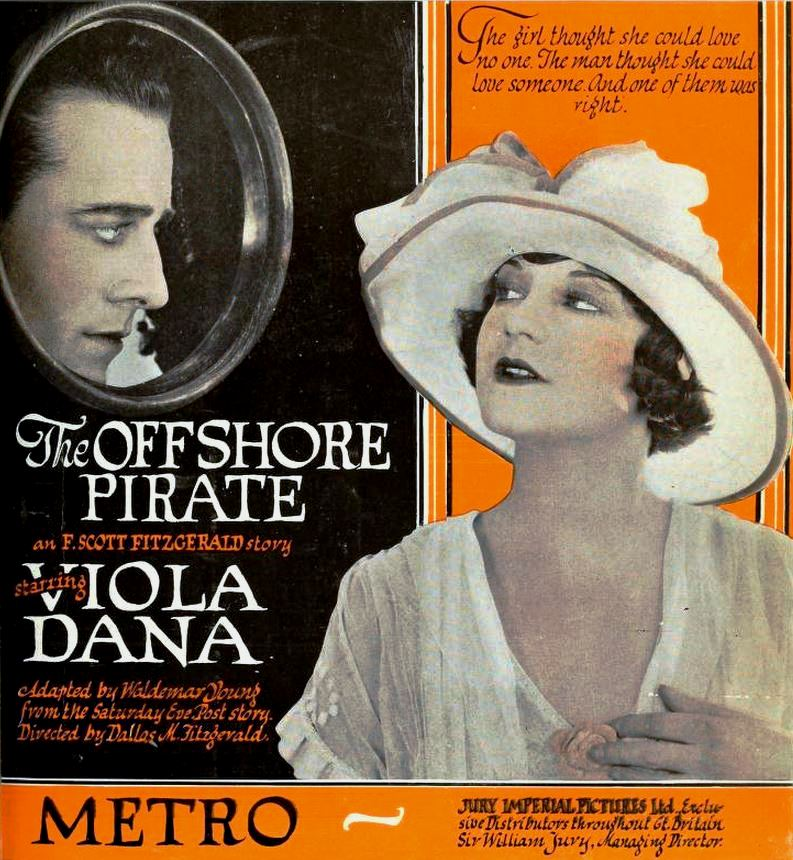
ad for film

The Off-Shore Pirate is a 1921 American silent romantic comedy film produced and released by Metro Pictures and directed by Dallas Fitzgerald. The film was based on the short story "The Offshore Pirate" by F. Scott Fitzgerald, of no relation to the director, that was published in The Saturday Evening Post. Viola Dana and Jack Mulhall star in the film.

== Plot ==
As summarized in a film publication, Ardita Farnam (Dana), wealthy and beautiful, had a will of her own and a yacht. When her uncle (Jobson) indicated that he wanted her to meet a certain man, she decided that she wanted to marry a foreigner, saying she wanted a man with a past rather than a future. Alone on her yacht one evening Ardita heard some jazz melodies floating over the waves. A good-looking man (Mulhall) along with six black musicians came aboard. They tell Ardita that they have been giving a charity performance that afternoon and at the end had relieved the audience of their valuables, and now intended to use the yacht to escape. They go out to sea. Later the leader, who calls himself Curtis Caryle, is put off the yacht. Ardita feels sorry for him and follows him. Then her uncle arrives. The man explains that he is Toby Moreland, the man her uncle wanted her to meet. She says that she knew it all along and decides to marry him.

== Cast ==
- Viola Dana as Ardita Farnam
- Jack Mulhall as Toby Moreland
- Edward Jobson as Uncle John Farnam
- Edward Cecil as Ivan Nevkova

== Preservation ==
It is not known whether the film currently survives.
