= Leslie T. Peacocke =

American actor

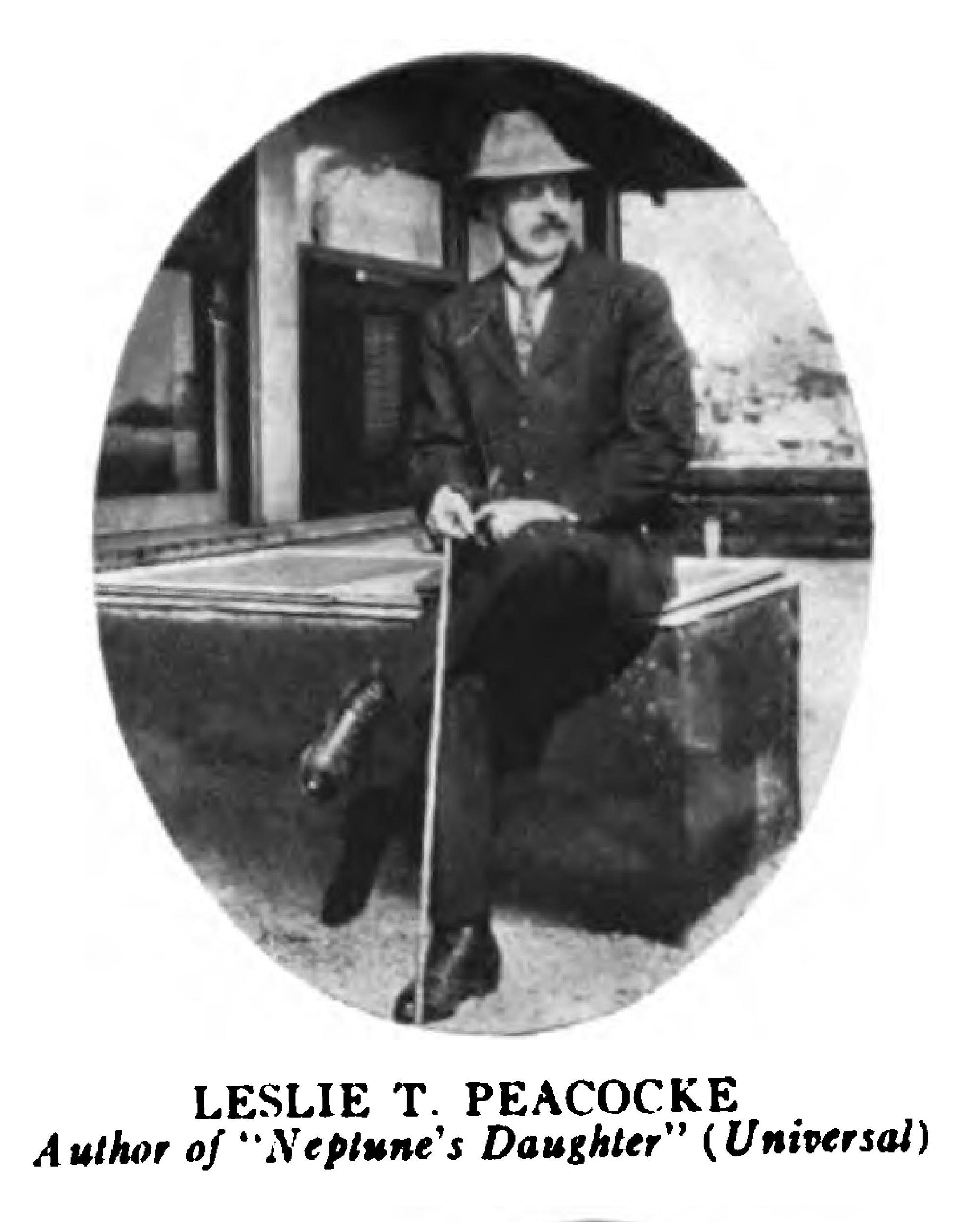

Captain Leslie Tufnell Peacocke (1872 – March 5, 1941) was an actor, screenwriter, and director in the United States.

He was born in Bangalore, British Raj and served in the Connaught Rangers before emigrating to the United States.

In 1919 he wrote on behalf of Democracy Film Corporation about producing a film adaptation of The Souls of Black Folk. His film Injustice was a response to Thomas Dixon Jr.'s The Clansman.

His book Hints on Photoplay Writing from his articles in Photoplay Magazine was published in 1916. A photo of the author appears at the beginning of the book.

His films include adaptations of stories by Florence Herrington.

He was an actor in the 1929 show A Comedy of Women at the Ambassador Theatre.

== Filmography ==
=== Actor ===
- His Neighbor's Wife (1913) as Captain Roberts
- The Woman Who Dared (1916) as Minister of Foreign Affairs
- Bab the Fixer (1917) as John Porter
- Betty Be Good (1917) as Jonathan Brownlee
- Angel Child (1918) as Glory's father
- Shadows of Suspicion (1919) as Chief of Scotland Yard
- The Vanishing Dagger (1920)
- Black Beauty (1921) as Lord Wynwaring. Film is partially extant.

=== Writer ===
- The Other Fellow (1912)
- Neptune's Daughter (1914)
- Salvation Nell (1915)
- Help! (1916)
- The Woman Who Dared (1916)
- The Unwritten Law (1916)
- The Clean Gun (1917)
- Mentioned in Confidence (1917)
- The Alien Blood (1917)
- Innocence (1917)
- The Checkmate (1917)
- Brand's Daughter (1917)
- Whatever the Cost (1918)
- The Heart of Juanita (1919)
- Injustice (1919)
- Reformation (1919)

=== Director ===
- Putting One Over on Ignatz (1917)
- Good Morning, Nurse! (1917)
- It Happened in Room 7 (1917)
- O, It's Great to Be Crazy (1918) with Stan Laurel
- Reformation (1919), a Sidney P. Dones film
- Injustice (1919)
- Neptune's Bride (1920)
- The Midnight Flower (1923)
- The Wheel of Fortune (1923)
