= The Offshore Pirate =

1920 short story by F. Scott Fitzgerald

- Short story by F. Scott Fitzgerald
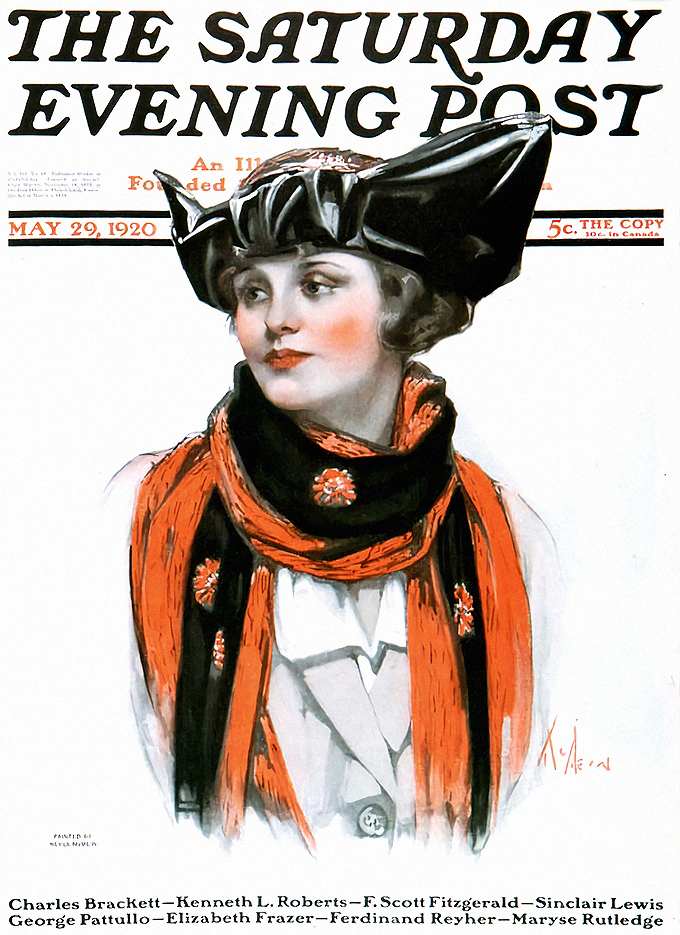
- May 29, 1920 cover of the The Saturday Evening Post

Text available at Wikisource
- Country: United States
- Language: English
- Genre: Short story

Publication
- Published in: The Saturday Evening Post
- Publication type: Periodical
- Publisher: Curtis Publishing Company
- Media type: Print (magazine, hardback and paperback)
- Publication date: May 29, 1920

"The Offshore Pirate" is a short story by American writer F. Scott Fitzgerald. It is one of eight short stories included in Fitzgerald's first published collection, Flappers and Philosophers. The story was first published in the May 29, 1920, issue of The Saturday Evening Post and illustrated by Leslie L. Benson.

== Plot summary ==
"The Offshore Pirate" is told in the third-person omniscient point of view, with Ardita Farnam as the focal character. The story opens on a luxury yacht off the coast of Florida shortly after the First World War. Lounging on deck is the 19-year-old Ardita Farnam, the wealthy heir of a family fortune. Raised by her father's brother and his wife, she is well-educated, indolent, pretty, and scornful of the men in her social class. The object of the sea cruise, organized by her uncle, is to prevent Ardita from rendezvousing with her latest beau in Palm Beach, a man her family regards as a licentious bounder, while she regards him as a man possessing "the courage of his own convictions."

When her uncle insists that she join a dinner party to meet the 26-year-old Toby Moreland, the son of an associate, she flippantly dismisses the offer and insists she be taken to Palm Beach. Disgusted, the uncle departs on a launch to spend the night on shore. Ardita is left on the yacht in solitude. An elaborate practical joke, organized by her uncle and Toby begins to unfold, the purpose of which is to tame the shrewish Ardita and woo her to matrimony.

As night falls, seven men in a large rowboat approach the yacht, six black men at the oars, and a white man at the helm. The rowers sing lusty songs with nonsense lyrics. "Carrots and peas/Beans on their knees/Pigs in the seas/Lucky fellows!" The white man conducts with a baton.

Ardita, leaning over the rail, is astonished and intrigued by the bizarre ensemble. The white man leaps aboard and demands, pirate-like, that she surrender the vessel. Ardita is momentarily stunned by his good looks, but recovers and orders him off the yacht. Ignoring her, he and his six-man crew proceed to take possession of the ship: the yacht's chief engineer, cook and a valet submit to the hijackers.

The strange men carry aboard musical instruments and mysterious white sacks. The white man introduces himself to Ardita as Curtis Carlyle, his men the "Six Black Buddies", all of them nightclub entertainers. The bags apparently contain loot from a Palm Beach heist. He gives Ardita an ultimatum: she can row to shore or stay on the yacht and join them on their high-seas escape. Ardita, fearless and defiant, finds her predicament exciting and remains on board.

When they get underway, she and Carlyle begin to share their personal histories and exchange philosophies on life. He tells of his life as a struggling musician, his service in the army, and his ambition to become wealthy: he plans to travel to India and become a rajah. She relates her backstory as a much sought-after rich girl, pursued by men she holds in low esteem. Ardita detects a certain gravity in Carlyle's character she finds compelling. Carlyle and his men navigate to a remote island and conceal the ship in a secluded cove so as to evade revenue cutters searching for them. While the pirates keep lookout, Ardita and Carlyle enjoy a tropical interlude for several days: she is falling in love.

An unidentified vessel is spotted near the mouth of the cove. The pirates suspect they have been discovered, and prepare to resist. Firearms are distributed. The revenue cruiser appears, mounted with six-inch cannons and machine guns. The situation appears hopeless. To Ardita's delight, Carlyle keeps his nerve. The revenue officers board the yacht, with Ardita's uncle leading. Confronting his niece, he berates her for absconding with pirates. Flinging her arms around Carlyle, she tells her uncle to shut up. Now certain he has won Ardita's everlasting devotion, "Carlyle" reveals that he is, in fact, Toby Moreland. He admits that he masterminded the elaborate burlesque in order to win her affection and wed her.

Unfazed, Ardita kisses Toby, and the Six Black Buddies begin to serenade them: "Time is a Thief/Gladness and grief/Cling to the leaf/As it yellows—"

== Publication history ==
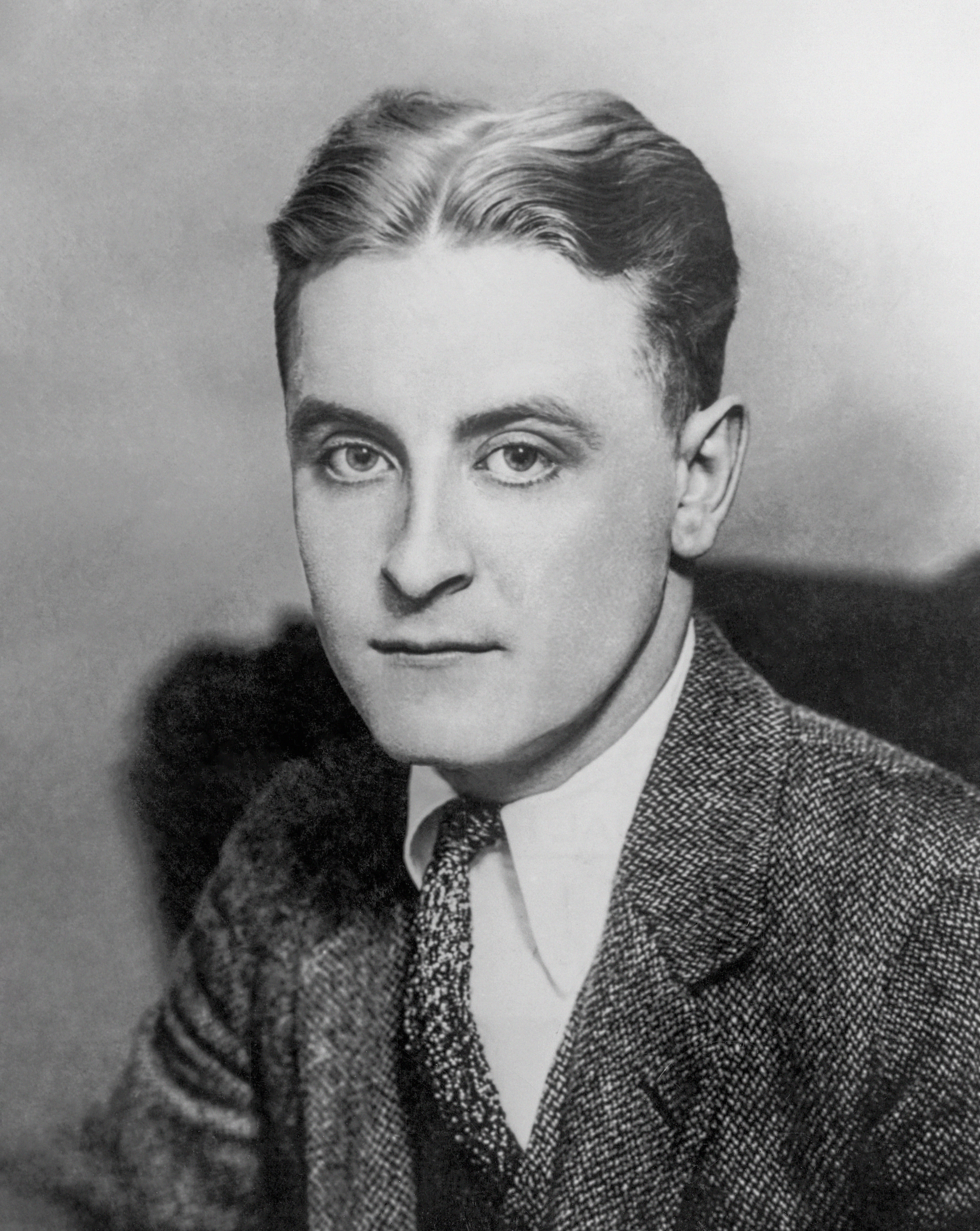
F. Scott Fitzgerald

Fitzgerald sent the final draft of the story to his editor Harold Ober in January 1920. The story was first published in the May 29, 1920 issue of The Saturday Evening Post, his third short story appearance in the magazine that month. The story was republished in the short story collection Flappers and Philosophers.

== Critical analysis ==
Fitzgerald's early short fiction, as represented in Flappers and Philosophers (1920), frequently offers "authorial self-conscious" declarations. Literary critic John Kuehl cites the following "pseudo-philosophical passage" from "The Offshore Pirate" as an example:

Most of us are content to exist and breed and fight for the right to do both, and the dominant idea, the foredoomed attempt to control one's destiny, is reserved for the fortunate and unfortunate few."

As Fitzgerald was still in his youth (23 years of age), Kuehl suggests that such sententious pronouncements would be less intrusive if issued by the story's protagonists.

Kuehl adds that Fitzgerald "betrayed bad taste" in rating "The Offshore Pirate" superior to his "A Diamond as Big as the Ritz," the latter termed "a classic novelette" by biographer Matthew J. Bruccoli.

In his annotated table of contents from Tales of the Jazz Age (1922), Fitzgerald demurred when a "well-known critic" hailed "A Diamond as Big as the Ritz," writing: "Personally, I prefer ‘The Offshore Pirate.'"

== Adaptations ==
The story was adapted to film as The Off-Shore Pirate in 1921, which starred Viola Dana as Ardita.

In 2010, an operatic version by Joel Weiss premiered at Christopher Street Opera in New York City.
