= The Husband Hunter =

1920 film

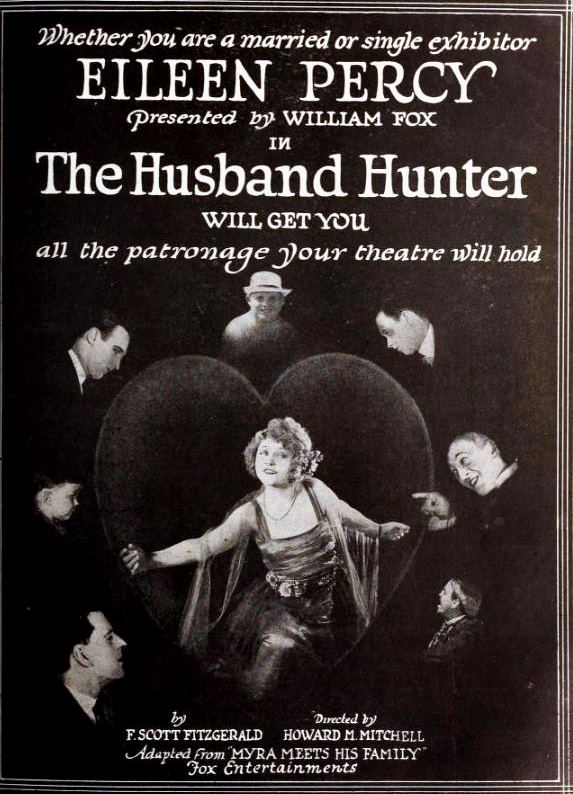
- Magazine Ad
- Directed by: Howard M. Mitchell
- Written by: Joseph F. Poland
- Story by: F. Scott Fitzgerald
- Based on: Myra Meets His Family by F. Scott Fitzgerald
- Produced by: Fox Film Corporation
- Starring: Eileen Percy
- Cinematography: Walter Williams
- Distributed by: Fox Film Corporation
- Release date: September 1920
- Running time: 5 reels
- Country: USA
- Language: Silent (English intertitles)

The Husband Hunter is a 1920 American comedy-drama film directed by Howard M. Mitchell starring Eileen Percy and Emory Johnson. Note that there was also a British film in 1920 with the same name.

== Cast ==
Actor	Role
Eileen Percy	Myra Hastings
Emory Johnson	Kent Whitney
Jane Miller	Lilah Elkins
Evans Kirk	Bob Harkness
Edward McWade	Charles Mack
John Steppling	Kelly
Harry Dunkinson	Arthur Elkins

== Gallery ==
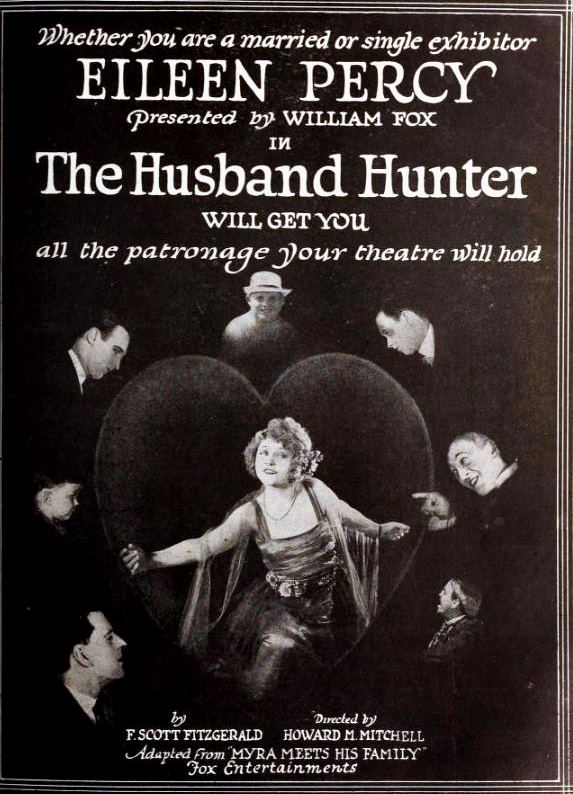

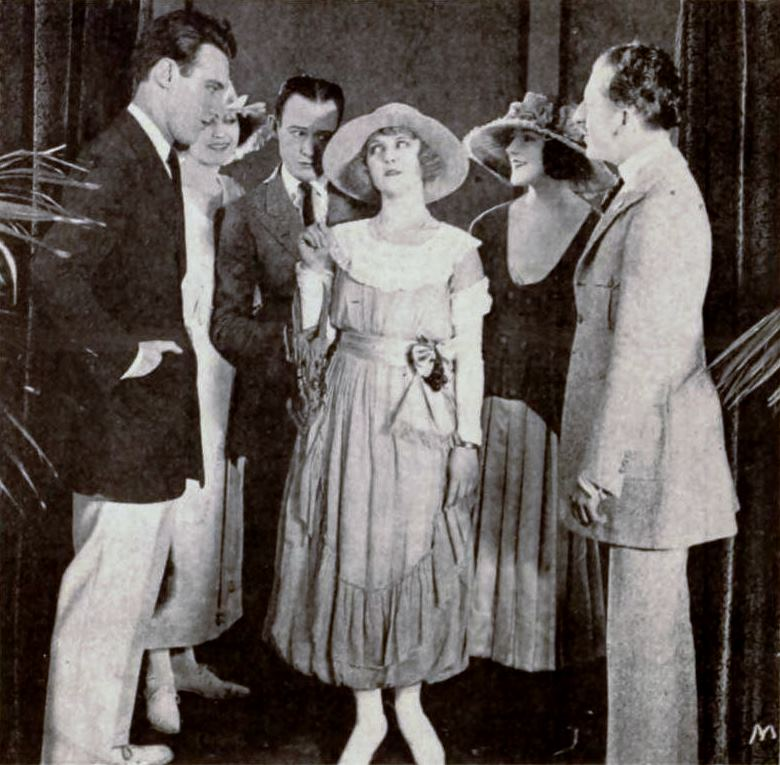

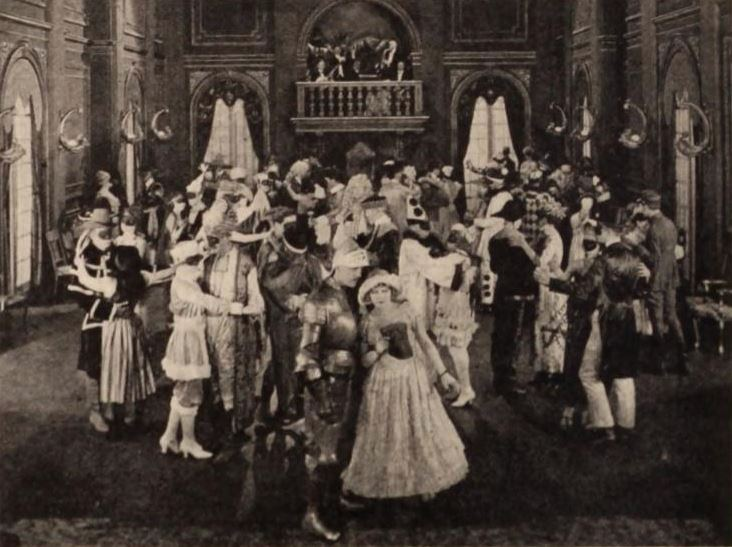

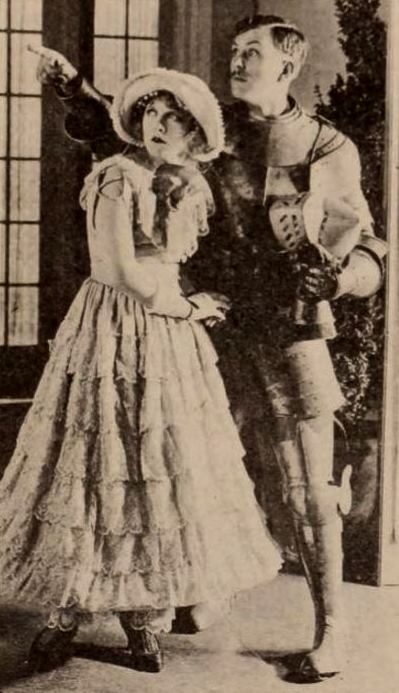

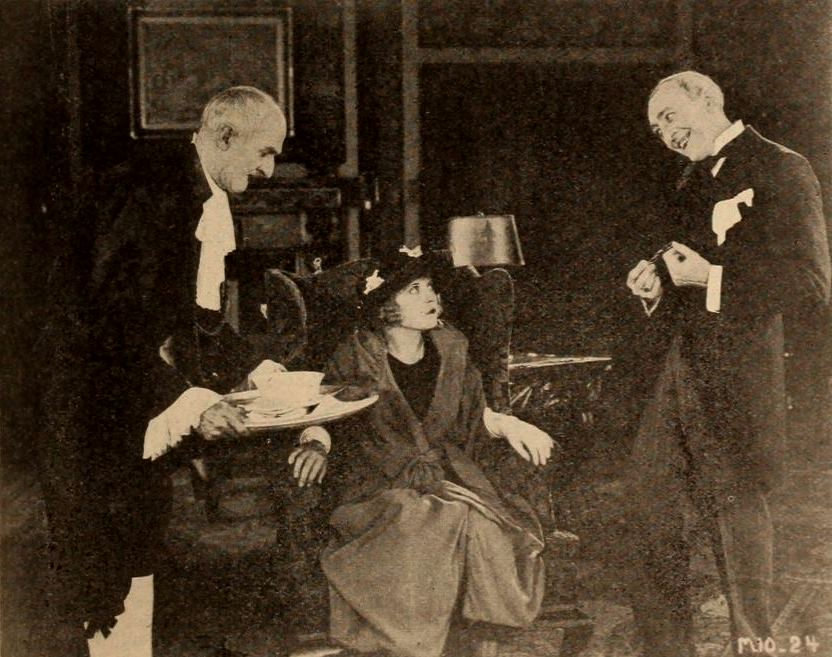
