= Harry Harvey (Medal of Honor, 1901) =

- Born: June 4, 1873; New York City, US
- Died: April 5, 1929 (aged 56)
- Burial place: Los Angeles National Cemetery
- Military career
- Allegiance: United States of America
- Branch: United States Marine Corps
- Service years: 1898 - 1903
- Rank: Sergeant
- Conflicts: Philippine–American War
- Awards: Medal of Honor

Harry Harvey (June 4, 1873 – April 5, 1929) was a United States Marine who was awarded the United States highest honor, the Medal of Honor for "meritorious conduct" during the Philippine–American War.

== Biography ==
Harvey was born in New York City. He joined the Marine Corps from Brooklyn in February 1898, and was honorably discharged 5 years later.

Harry Harvey is buried in the Los Angeles National Cemetery.

== Medal of Honor citation ==
Rank and organization: Sergeant, U.S. Marine Corps. Born: June 4, 1873, New York, N.Y. Accredited to: New Jersey. G.O. No.: 55, July 19, 1901. Citation:

Citation:

Served in battle against the enemy at Benictican, 16 February 1900. Throughout this action and in the presence of the enemy, Harvey distinguished himself by meritorious conduct.

== See also ==
- List of Medal of Honor recipients
