= The Last Tycoon =

1941 unfinished novel by F. Scott Fitzgerald

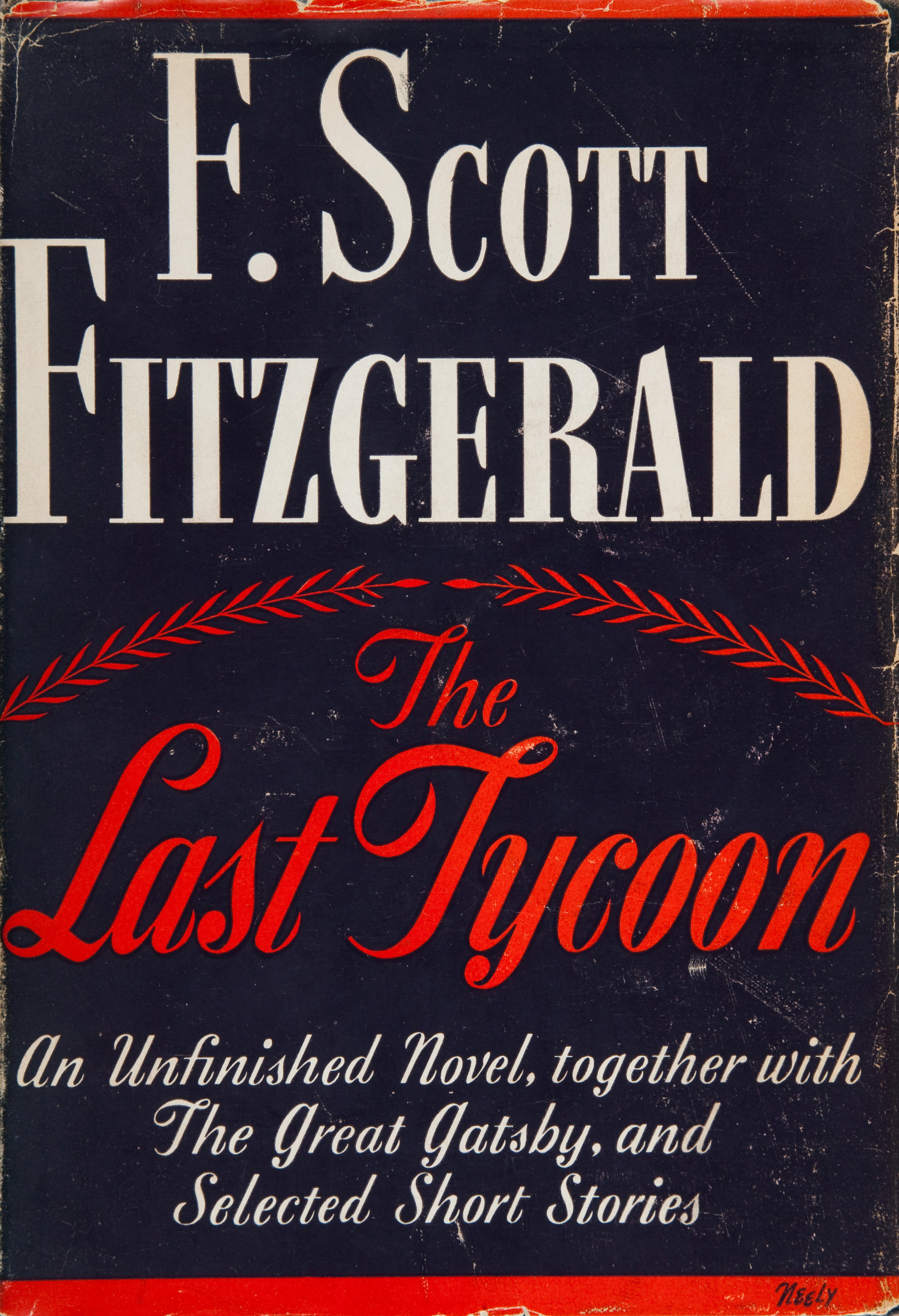
- First edition
- Editor: Edmund Wilson
- Author: F. Scott Fitzgerald
- Cover artist: Neely
- Language: English
- Publisher: Charles Scribner's Sons
- Publication date: November 4, 1941 (posthumously)
- Publication place: United States
- Media type: Print (hardback & paperback)
- Pages: 163 (paperback edition)
- OCLC: 28147241
- Dewey Decimal: 813/.52 20
- LC Class: PS3511.I9 L68 1993
- Preceded by: Tender Is the Night (1934)

The Last Tycoon is an unfinished novel by American writer F. Scott Fitzgerald. In 1941, it was published posthumously under this title, as prepared by his friend Edmund Wilson, a critic and writer. According to Publishers Weekly, the novel is "generally considered a roman à clef", with its lead character, Monroe Stahr, modeled after film producer Irving Thalberg. The story follows Stahr's rise to power in Hollywood, and his conflicts with rival Pat Brady, a character based on MGM studio head Louis B. Mayer.

It was adapted as a TV play in 1957 and an eponymous film in 1976, with a screenplay for the motion picture by British dramatist Harold Pinter. Elia Kazan directed the film adaptation; Robert De Niro and Theresa Russell starred.

In 1993, a new version of the novel was published under the title The Love of the Last Tycoon, edited by Matthew Bruccoli, a Fitzgerald scholar. This version was adapted for a stage production that premiered in Los Angeles, California, in 1998. In 2013, HBO announced plans to produce an adaptation. HBO cancelled the project and gave the rights to Sony Pictures, which produced and released the television series on Amazon Studios in 2016.

== Plot summary ==
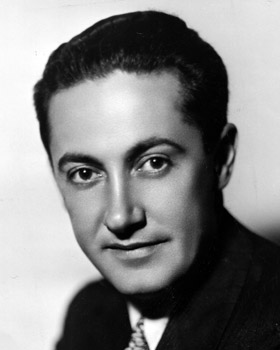
The character of Monroe Stahr was based on Irving Thalberg.

Set in the 1930s, The Last Tycoon traces the life of Hollywood studio manager Monroe Stahr, clearly based on Irving Thalberg (in charge of production at MGM), whom Fitzgerald had encountered several times.

The novel begins with young Bennington College student Cecilia Brady (first-person narrator), the daughter of influential Hollywood producer Pat Brady, preparing to fly home from the East Coast to Los Angeles. At the airport, she is surprised to meet an old friend of her father, author Wylie White. White is accompanied by a failed producer introduced as Mr. Schwartz. Due to complications during the flight, they made a forced landing in Nashville, Tennessee. The threesome decides on a spontaneous trip to the historic estate of former President Andrew Jackson, but on arrival, the attraction is closed. Wylie then proceeds to flirt shamelessly with Cecilia while Mr. Schwartz is fast asleep. When Schwartz awakens, he informs them that he has changed his mind and will not travel to Los Angeles with them. He asks Wylie to deliver a message to a friend, which he gladly accepts. The next day, Wylie and Cecilia learn that Schwartz committed suicide right after they left Nashville.

Cecilia realizes that the message Schwartz gave to Wylie was in fact for Monroe Stahr, her father's business partner. She has had a crush on Stahr for many years. Cecilia arrives at her father's film studio to pick him up for a birthday party. Due to a minor earthquake, Cecilia, her father, and his companions all end up in Stahr's office. A water pipe bursts and floods the set. Stahr beholds two women desperately clinging to the head of a statue – finding one of them to be the spitting image of his late wife. The day after, Stahr asks his secretary to identify the girls for him. She presents him with a phone number which he immediately uses to arrange a meeting with one of the girls. Unfortunately, it is not the girl he wishes to see; she does not resemble his wife at all. Stahr gives her a ride home, where she insists that he come in and meet her friend (the young Irish-born Kathleen Moore). As soon as Moore opens the front door, Stahr recognizes her to be the woman he had seen the other night.

Kathleen withstands his advances on her and even refuses to tell him her name. It is only when Stahr happens to meet her again at a party that he can convince her to go out and have a cup of coffee with him. He drives her to the building site of his new house in Santa Monica. Kathleen seems reluctant to be with Stahr, but she still ends up having sex with him. A short time afterwards, Stahr receives a letter in which Kathleen confesses to having been engaged to another man for quite some time. She has now decided to marry him despite having fallen in love with Stahr.

Stahr asks Cecilia to arrange for a meeting with a suspected communist who wants to organize a labor union within the film studio. Stahr and Cecilia meet the man over supper where Stahr gets drunk and gets involved in a violent confrontation. Cecilia takes care of him and they grow closer. Cecilia's father, however, becomes more and more unhappy with Stahr as a business partner and has wanted to get rid of him for a long while. He could not approve less of his daughter's fancying him. Brady knows of Stahr's continued affair with the now-married Kathleen and tries to blackmail him into leaving the company. As he fails to achieve his goal via blackmail, he does not even shy away from hiring a professional killer. Stahr survives, and, in retaliation, also appoints a hitman to have Brady killed. Unlike Brady's, Stahr's conscience starts to trouble him. But, just as he contemplates calling the execution off, his plane crashes on its way back to New York City. The contract killer finishes his job unhindered and leaves Cecilia both without a father and without a lover – the two men who meant the world to her.

== List of characters ==
- Monroe Stahr – Hollywood film producer. Based on Irving Thalberg, Sheilah Graham believed Stahr to be Fitzgerald's "most glorified hero", who made the character "everything he would have liked to be himself". J. Donald Adams notes that Stahr is Fitzgerald's "most fully conceived character".
- Pat Brady – Stahr's associate, also a film producer. Brady was based on Louis B. Mayer, who had a well-known rivalry with Thalberg. He also possessed certain characteristics of Eddie Mannix.
- Cecilia Brady (Celia) – Brady's daughter. Based on Budd Schulberg and Fitzgerald's daughter, Scottie Fitzgerald.
- Kathleen Moore – Stahr's love interest. Sheliah Graham believed that the character of Kathleen was based on herself. Originally named Thalia, Graham suggested that Fitzgerald change the name, owing to a C. B. Cochran chorus girl with the same name who burned to death in an accident; Graham believed the name to be unlucky. Kathleen's ex-lover was composed of three men: John Graham Gillam, Graham's first husband; the Marquess of Donegall, Graham's ex-lover; and Fitzgerald himself.
- Minna Davis – Monroe Stahr's late wife
- Edna – Kathleen Moore's friend. Graham's friend Margaret Bainard was caricatured into being the character of Edna.
- Wylie White, Manny Schwartz, Jane Maloney, George Boxley, Martha Dodd, the Tarletons - Writers
- Marcus – Film producer
- Broaca, Red Ridingwood – Film directors
- Joe Reinmund – Film supervisor and Stahr's all-around man
- Pete Zavras – Cameraman
- Jaques La Borwitz – Assistant producer
- Robinson – Stahr's troubleshooter
- Mike Van Dyke – Gagman
- Rodriguez, Johnny Swanson, Carole Lombard, Gary Cooper – actors
- Lee Kapper – Art director
- Mort Fleishacker – Company's lawyer
- Joe Popolos – Theatre owner
- Agge – Prince of Denmark
- Brimmer – Communist party member
- Catherine Doolan and Katy – Stahr's secretaries
- Birdy Peters, Maud, Rosemary Schmiel – Pat Brady's secretaries
- Bernie – Photographer
- Doctor Baer – Physician
- Malone – Policeman
- Ned Sollinger – Stahr's office boy
- Filipino – Stahr's servant

== Background ==
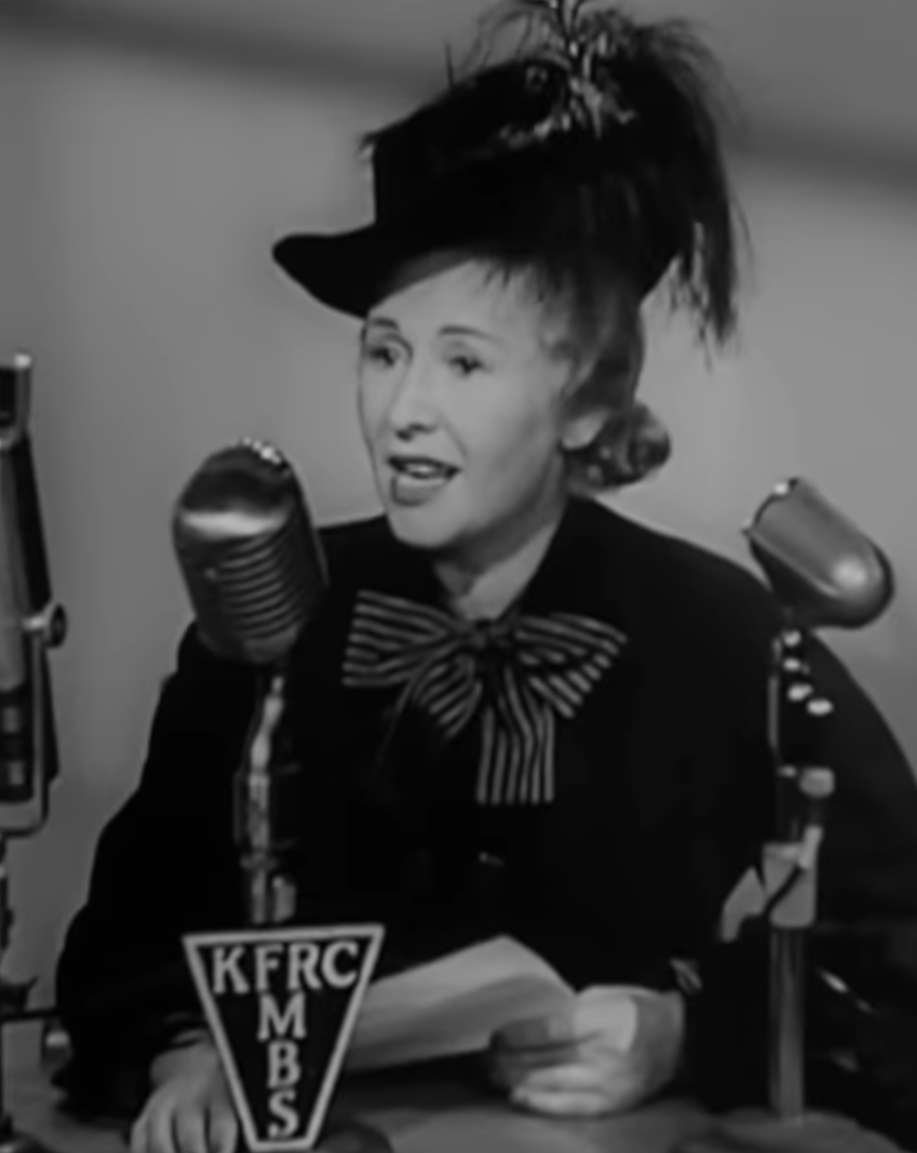
Sheilah Graham (pictured in 1949) lived with Fitzgerald at the time he was writing the novel. Her input was sought by Edmund Wilson when he was editing the novel for publication.

Fitzgerald first conceived the idea for the novel in 1931, when he met Irving Thalberg in Hollywood. Accordingly, Fitzgerald decided to set the novel in 1935, when Thalberg was still alive, so that more comparisons could be drawn between Stahr and Thalberg's lives. In preparation for writing the novel, Fitzgerald gathered all the information he could about Thalberg. Fitzgerald was initially calling the novel The Love of the Last Tycoon: A Western.

Fitzgerald planned the novel to be "constructed" and "dramatic" like The Great Gatsby, working methodically on it and reading his progress each night to Sheilah Graham. Fitzgerald incorporated his own experiences into the novel, such as his first meetings with Graham. Stahr and Kathleen's first meeting was inspired by Fitzgerald and Graham's first meeting; the two had met at a party and danced together. Indeed, Graham believed that the character of Kathleen was based on herself; she noted that Fitzgerald had written the character to feature many of her qualities, experiences and observations, including certain phrases that Graham had used herself. Graham contributed to certain scenes in the novel, including the seduction scene between Stahr and Kathleen. Originally, once Stahr began to tremble and lessen his grip on Kathleen, the scene ended without them having sex. Graham informed Fitzgerald that a woman who was in love with a man would be provocative and know how to arouse the man, and thus the two would consummate their relationship. Thus, Fitzgerald rewrote the scene to include Graham’s suggestion.

Fitzgerald claimed that he would not see fellow contemporary writer Ernest Hemingway until the novel had been published and was deemed a success. Fitzgerald told Edmund Wilson that he had written the novel "with difficulty", but was optimistic of its quality, believing it to be his best book that would win back his readers. The novel was originally planned to be 50,000 words long, but at the time of Fitzgerald's death, the novel was expected to be 90,000 to 100,000 words long. Graham believed that the love story between Stahr and Kathleen was initially an "afterthought" when writing the novel, but grew in importance as the novel progressed. Fitzgerald planned the novel in nine chapters, numbered A to I.

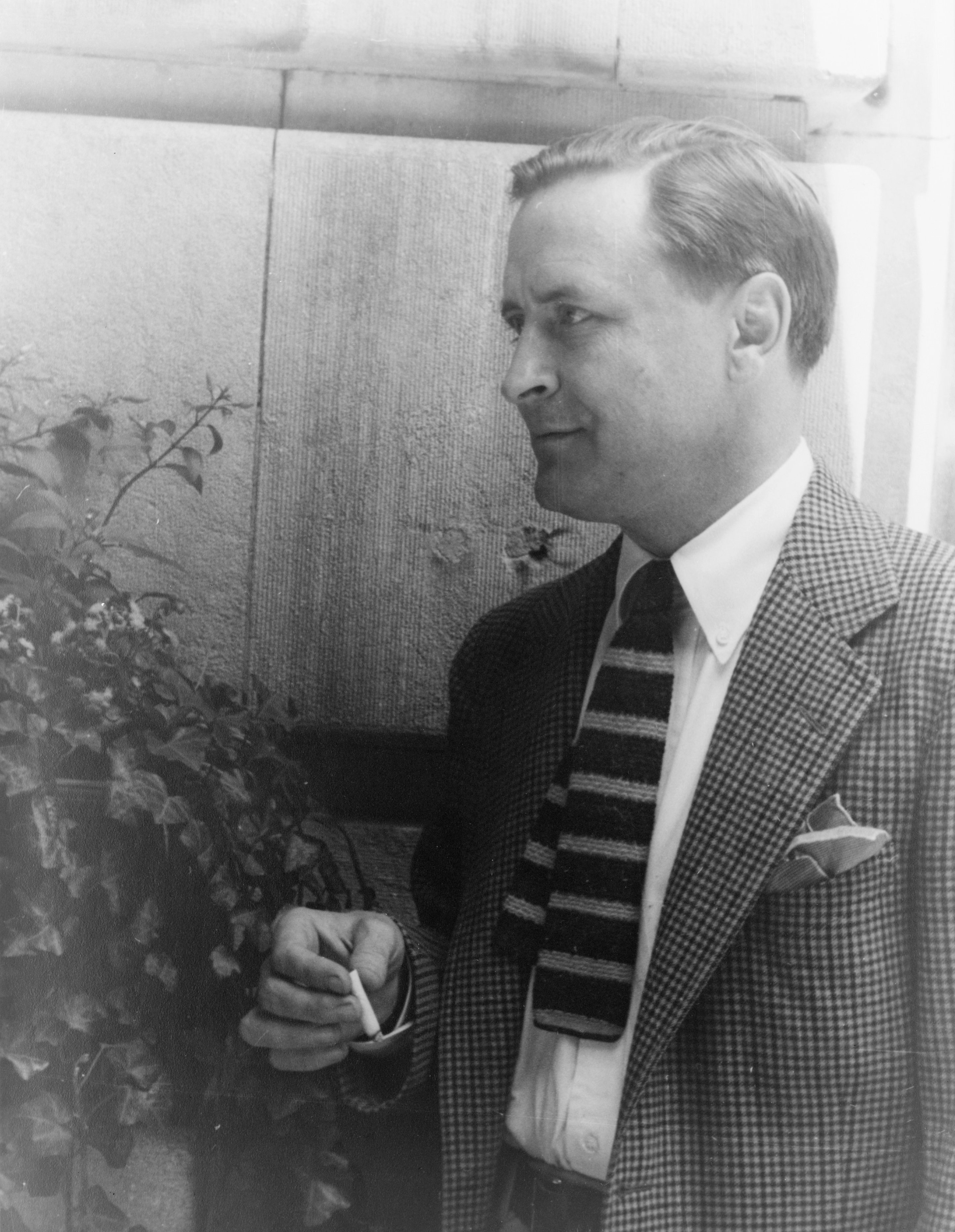
Fitzgerald in 1937, three years before his death

Fitzgerald wished to finish the novel by January 1941 and begin selling it by the fall of that year; however, he was behind schedule when he died in December 1940. Graham attributed this to two main reasons: firstly, the novel had expanded from what had originally been planned. Secondly, Fitzgerald could only work on the novel "in spurts", owing to his unstable financial situation, his ill health, and his necessity to take time off to write movie scripts so he would have enough funds to continue work on the novel.

Graham wrote in her memoir Beloved Infidel that she drafted notes for a letter to Perkins proposing that she supply $2,000 of her own savings toward a $5,000 advance from Scribner's, to be paid to Fitzgerald at $1,000 a month as if it came entirely from the publisher, so that he could finish the first draft without returning to studio work. Her notes stipulated that Fitzgerald was never to know of her part in the arrangement, even if the book succeeded.

Fitzgerald was having trouble with writing the sixth chapter (numbered "F"), but had fixed the problems by the end of the night of his death. However, the novel was, according to Graham, "little more than half finished", while J. Donald Adams, writing for The New York Times, notes that it was "something less than half the projected work", at around 60,000 words long. Fitzgerald's daughter, Scottie, wrote that the unfinished novel was "almost the greatest tragedy" of his death: "It would have meant so much to him and to his career and to his reputation in the future."

=== Plans for remaining chapters ===
At the time of his death, Fitzgerald had only completed the first draft of the novel up to the sixth chapter, with the remaining chapters consisting of outlines and notes only. In his notes for the sixth chapter, Fitzgerald had written "The Cummerbund", based on an anecdote of Graham's, in which she had decided not to marry a man because he wore a red cummerbund, which had embarrassed her. Upon hearing the anecdote, Fitzgerald wrote it down and was evidently going to include it in the novel. In his notes for the following chapter (numbered "G"), a note read: "Last fling with Kathleen, Old stars in heat wave at Encino." This was based on an "unbearably" hot day when Graham visited Fitzgerald at his house while other guests were there. Fitzgerald was to include a similar scene in the novel, with Stahr hosting a party for some of the "old stars" of the movie business. In the ninth and final chapter notes (numbered "I"), Fitzgerald had outlined plans for Stahr's funeral, which was to mirror that of Jay Gatsby in his earlier novel The Great Gatsby (1925), summarising the scene with a note that read "Johnny Swanson at funeral". According to Graham, Stahr's funeral was to be "pathetic in a totally different way" to Gatsby’s; while there were no mourners at Gatsby's funeral, there was to be every Hollywood-related person in attendance at Stahr's, each "vying for prominence".

== Publication history ==
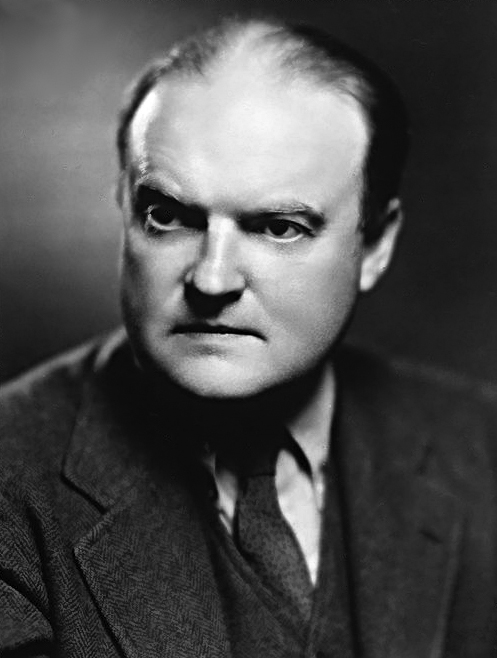
Edmund Wilson edited The Last Tycoon from the remaining notes written by F. Scott Fitzgerald and published the novel in 1941.

The novel was unfinished and in rough form at the time of Fitzgerald's death at age 44. The literary critic and writer Edmund Wilson, a close friend of Fitzgerald, informed Graham in July 1941 that the unfinished novel would be published, alongside Gatsby, because Perkins had admired it so much. Wilson sought Graham's assistance in compiling the notes for the novel, and he edited it for publication. The unfinished novel was published in 1941 as The Last Tycoon, by which name it is best known. Wilson would later write, in his review for Graham's memoir Beloved Infidel (1957), that "undoubtedly we would not have had The Last Tycoon but for Sheliah".

In 1993, another version of the novel was published under the title The Love of the Last Tycoon, as part of the Cambridge edition of the Works of F. Scott Fitzgerald, edited by Matthew J. Bruccoli, a Fitzgerald scholar. Bruccoli reworked the extant seventeen chapters of the thirty-one planned according to his interpretation of the author's notes. At least one reviewer considered Bruccoli's work to be a "remarkable feat of scholarship" and notes that it "restored Fitzgerald's original version and has also restored the narrative's ostensible working title, one that implies that Hollywood is the last American frontier where immigrants and their progeny remake themselves."

== Point of view ==
Fitzgerald wrote the novel in a blend of first person and third-person narrations. While the story is ostensibly told by Cecilia, many scenes are narrated in which she is not present. Occasionally, a scene will be presented twice, once through Cecilia and once through a third party. J. Donald Adams writes that "the narrator is the daughter of a big producer, an intelligent girl, of the world of the movies, yet not in it as an active participant, who looks back on the events she describes after a lapse of several years".

== Awards ==
The revised edition of The Love of the Last Tycoon won the Choice Outstanding Academic Books award of 1995.

== Reception ==
J. Donald Adams, reviewing for The New York Times, wrote that "one would be blind indeed not to see that it would have been Fitzgerald's best novel and a very fine one". So too did Edmund Wilson believe it to be his finest work. Fitzgerald's editor Maxwell Perkins wrote a letter to Sheliah Graham, stating that "the first chapter alone is good enough to stand by itself. It breaks a man's heart to see what this book could have been".

In The New York Times Book Review, Morley Callaghan, when reviewing Graham's memoir College of One (1961), which detailed Fitzgerald's specialised education program for Graham, criticised how Fitzgerald had prioritised devising the College of One and had written many letters to Graham, yet had not found time to write his novel.

== Adaptations ==
=== Film ===
In 1976, British playwright Harold Pinter adapted the work into a feature film. Directed by Elia Kazan (his last film) and produced by Sam Spiegel, The Last Tycoon starred Robert De Niro as Monroe Stahr and Theresa Russell as Cecilia Brady, and featured appearances by Robert Mitchum and Jack Nicholson. Pinter later won the Nobel Prize for his dramatic plays.

=== Radio ===
In 2013, a 90-minute audio adaptation by Feelgood Fiction for BBC Radio 4 was adapted and directed by Bill Bryden, starring Aidan Gillen and Jack Shepherd.

=== Stage ===
The work has been adapted to the stage multiple times. In 1998, Simon Levy adapted the 1993 edition with permission from the Fitzgerald Estate. Opening at The Fountain Theatre in Los Angeles, it received high praise and numerous awards. In 2016, Levy's stage adaptation had its European premiere, opening at the Arts Theatre in London on August 17, 2016. Ruby In The Dust Theatre produced it with the author's permission. Directed by Linnie Reedman.

In 2014, Japan's all-female theatre company Takarazuka Revue staged a musical adaptation of The Love of The Last Tycoon for then Flower Troupe top star Tomu Ranju's farewell performance.

=== Television ===
In 1957, John Frankenheimer directed a TV version for Playhouse 90, with Jack Palance as Monroe Stahr, Keenan Wynn, Lee Remick, and Peter Lorre. The episode debuted on the CBS television network on March 14th.

In 2013, HBO announced plans for a TV series based on the novel, with Billy Ray writing the script. On November 7, 2014, Amazon Studios picked up Billy Ray's adaptation after HBO passed on it and announced it would be produced by Sony Pictures Television. On November 23, 2015, actor Matt Bomer was cast as Monroe Stahr, Lily Collins as Cecilia Brady, and it was announced that Ray would write and direct the pilot episode. The pilot was released on June 17, 2016. The first season was released on July 28, 2017. Amazon canceled the series after one season in September 2017.

== Publication history ==
- 1941, as The Last Tycoon, F. Scott Fitzgerald and Edmund Wilson. current ISBN 0-14-118563-5
- 1993, The Love of the Last Tycoon, Cambridge University Press, ISBN 0-521-40231-X, hardcover
- 2003, The Love of the Last Tycoon, Charles Scribner's Sons, ISBN 0-02-019985-6, paperback
