= Gävle goat =

Straw Christmas goat in Gävle, Sweden

Coordinates: 60.6728°N 17.1465°E

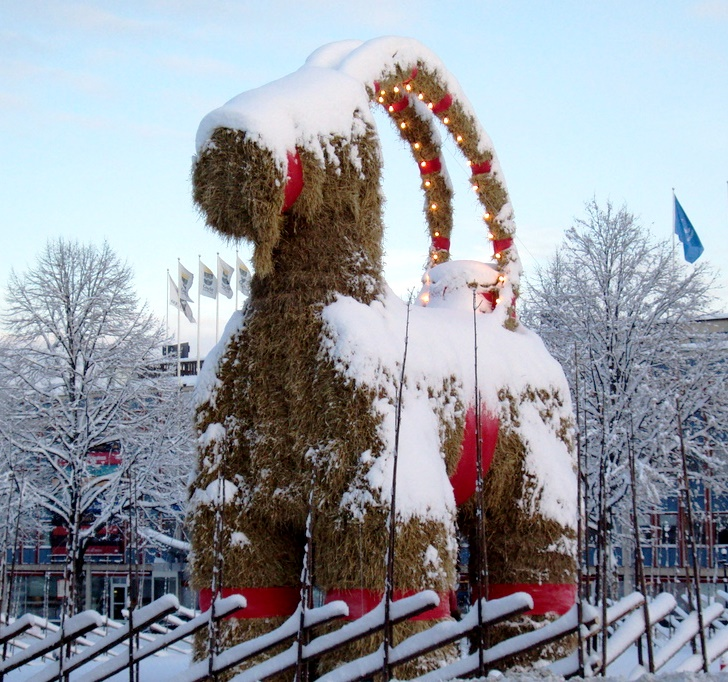
Gävle goat in 2009

The Gävle Goat (Swedish: Gävlebocken, pronounced [ˈjɛ̌ːvlɛbɔkːɛn]) is a traditional Christmas display erected annually at Slottstorget (Castle Square) in central Gävle, Sweden. The display is a giant version of a traditional Swedish Yule goat figure made of straw. It is erected each year by local community groups at the beginning of Advent over a period of two days.

The Gävle Goat has been the subject of repeated arson attacks; despite security measures and a nearby fire station, the goat has been burned to the ground most years since its first appearance in 1966. As of December 2025, 43 out of 60 goats have been destroyed or damaged in some way. Burning or otherwise destroying the goat is illegal, and the Svea Court of Appeal has said that the offence normally carries a 3-month prison sentence.

Since 1986, two separate Yule goats have been built in Gävle: the Gävle Goat by the Southern Merchants and the Yule Goat built by the Natural Science Club of the School of Vasa.

== History ==
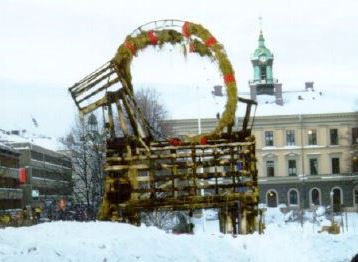
The Gävle goat after being burned down during a blizzard in 1998

The Gävle Goat is erected every year on the first day of Advent, which according to Western Christian tradition is in late November or early December, depending on the calendar year. In 1966, an advertising consultant, Stig Gavlén (1927–2018), came up with the idea of making a giant version of the traditional Swedish Yule goat and placing it in the square. The design of the first goat was assigned to the then chief of the Gävle fire department, Gavlén's brother Jörgen Gavlén. The construction of the goat was carried out by the fire department, and they erected the goat each year from 1966 to 1970 and from 1986 to 2002. The first goat was financed by Harry Ström. On 1 December 1966, a 13-metre (43 ft) tall, 7-metre (23 ft) long, 3-tonne goat was erected in the square. On New Year's Eve, the goat was burnt down, and the perpetrator was found and convicted of vandalism. The goat was insured, and Ström got all of his money back.

A group of businessmen known as the Southern Merchants (Söders köpmän) financed the building of the goat in subsequent years. In 1971, the Southern Merchants stopped building the goats. The Natural Science Club (Naturvetenskapliga föreningen) of the School of Vasa (Vasaskolan) began building the structure. Their goat was around 2 metres (6.6 ft). Due to the positive reaction their Yule Goat received that year, they built another one the following year and from then on. The Southern Merchants began building their own goats again in 1986.

The cost for the 1966 goat was 10,000 Swedish kronor (SEK) (equivalent to SEK 84,355 in 2009). The price tag for constructing the goat in 2005 was around SEK 100,000. The city pays one-third of the cost while the Southern Merchants pay the remaining sum.

== Repeated destruction by fire ==
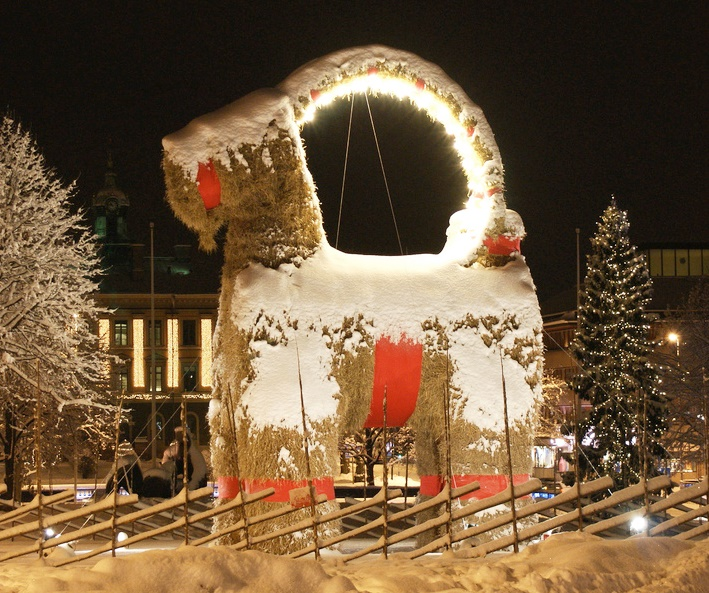
The Gävle goat in December 2009

The display has become notable for being a recurring target for vandalism by arson, and has been destroyed many times since the first goat was erected in 1966. Because the fire station is close to the location of the goat, most of the time the fire can be extinguished before the wooden skeleton is severely damaged. If the goat is burned down before Saint Lucia Day on 13 December, the goat is rebuilt. Its skeleton is then treated and repaired, and the goat reconstructed over it, using straw which the Goat Committee has pre-ordered. As of 2005, four people had been caught or convicted for vandalizing the goat. In 2001, the goat was burned down by a 51-year-old American visitor from Cleveland, Ohio, who spent 18 days in jail and was subsequently convicted and ordered to pay SEK 100,000 (US$9,681.35; equivalent to US$21,192 in 2025) in damages. The court confiscated his cigarette lighter with the argument that he was not able to handle it. He stated in court that he was no "goat burner", and believed that he was taking part in a completely legal goat-burning tradition. After he was released from jail he returned to the US without paying his fine.

In 1996, the Southern Merchants introduced camera surveillance to monitor the goat 24 hours a day. On 27 November 2004, the Gävle Goat's homepage was hacked, and one of the two official webcams changed. In 2003, while security guards were posted around the goat in order to prevent vandalism, the temperature dropped far below freezing. As the guards sheltered in a nearby restaurant to escape the cold, the goat was burned.

During the weekend of 3–4 December 2005, a series of attacks on public Yule Goats across Sweden were carried out; the Gävle Goat was burnt on 3 December. The Visby goat on Gotland burned down, the Yule Goat in Söderköping, Östergötland was torched, and there was an attack on a goat located in Lycksele, Västerbotten.

The Christmas season of 2006 marked the 40th anniversary of the Gävle Goat, and the city held a large celebration in honor of the goat on 3 December. The Goat Committee fireproofed the goat with "Fiber ProTector Fireproof", a fireproofing substance used in airplanes. In earlier years, when the goat had been fireproofed, the dew had made the liquid drip off the goat. To prevent this from happening, "Fireproof ProTechtor Solvent Base" was applied to the goat.

Despite their efforts, the goat has been damaged or destroyed a total of 43 times. On 27 November 2016, an arsonist equipped with petrol burned it down just hours after its inauguration. After a few flame-free years under 24-hour security, the goat was again burned on 17 December 2021. In 2023, it was severely pecked at for grain by jackdaws, due to the straw used to construct the goat containing higher than usual amounts of seeds. In 2025, it was blown over by strong winds from Storm Johannes.

In the years it has been allowed to stand throughout Christmas, the goat has been disassembled a few days before or after New Year's Day, with the straw discarded and the frame structure stored for next year.

== Natural Science Club's Yule Goat ==
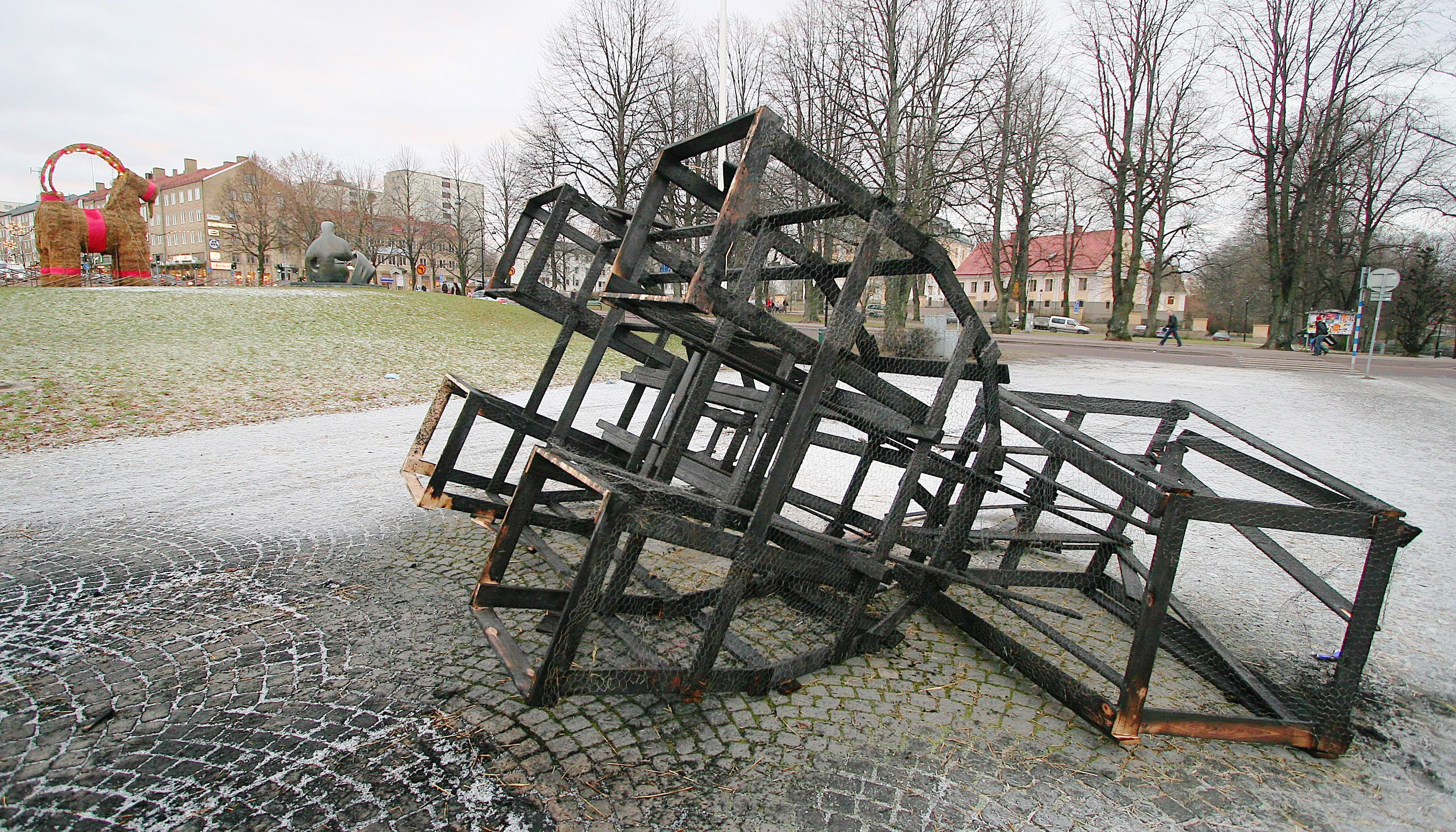
The burned Natural Science Club Goat in 2006, with the larger Gävle goat visible in the distance

Since 1986, there have been two Yule Goats built in Gävle: the Gävle Goat by the Southern Merchants and the Yule Goat built by the Natural Science Club of the School of Vasa. Until 1985 the Southern Merchants held the world record for the largest Yule Goat, but over the years the Natural Science Club's goat increased in size, and in 1985 their Yule Goat made it into the Guinness Book of Records with an official height of 12.5 m (41 ft). The creator of the original 1966 goat, Stig Gavlén, thought that the Natural Science Club's goat had unfairly won the title of the largest Yule Goat because the goat was not as attractive as the Southern Merchants' goat and the neck was excessively long.

The next year there was a Goat war: the Southern Merchants understood the publicity value, and erected a huge goat; the Natural Science Club erected a smaller one in protest. The Southern Merchants had intended that their huge goat would reclaim the world record, but the measurement of the goat showed it fell short. Over the following seven years there were no further attempts on the world record, but there was some hostility between the Natural Science Club and the Southern Merchants, evidenced by the fact that the Natural Science Club put up a sign near their goat wishing a Merry Christmas to everyone, except the Southern Merchants.

In 1993, the Southern Merchants again announced that they were going to attempt the world record. The goat stood 10.5 metres (34 ft) when completed. The Natural Science Club's Yule Goat that year measured 14.9 metres (49 ft), which earned them another place in the Guinness Book of Records.

== Timeline ==
=== 1966–1969 ===
Year	Security additions	Date of destruction	Method of destruction	Notes
1966		31 December	Fire	
1967		Survived		
1968	Fence added.	Survived		
1969	Inside of goat protected by chicken-wire netting.	31 December	Fire	

=== 1970–1979 ===
Year	Security additions	Date of destruction	Method of destruction	Notes
1970		Six hours after construction	Fire	The goat's destruction was blamed on two drunk teenagers. With help from several financial contributors, the goat was reassembled out of lake reed.
1971		?	Smashed to pieces	The Southern Merchants became tired of their goats being burned down, and stopped constructing them. The Natural Science Club from the School of Vasa took over and built a miniature goat.
1972		?	Collapsed	
1973		?	Stolen	The goat was stolen by a man, who then placed it in his backyard. He was later sentenced to two years in prison for aggravated theft.
1974		?	Fire	
1975		?	Collapsed	The goat collapsed under its own weight.
1976		?	Hit by a car	This year's goat was smaller than the previous ones. A student rammed the hind legs of the goat with a Volvo Amazon, collapsing the structure.
1977		?	Fire (Presumed)	
1978		?	Kicked to pieces	
1979	After the first goat was burned, a second was fireproofed.	Prior to assembly	Fire / Broken	The goat was burned down before construction even finished. A second goat was constructed and finished, but was later destroyed and broken into pieces.

=== 1980–1989 ===
Year	Security additions	Date of destruction	Method of destruction	Notes
1980		24 December	Fire	
1981		Survived		
1982		13 December	Fire	
1983		?	Legs destroyed	
1984		12 December	Fire	
1985	Enclosed by a 2-metre-high (6.6 ft) metal fence, guarded by Securitas and soldiers from Gävle's local army unit, I 14 Infantry Regiment.	January 1986	Fire	The 12.5-metre-tall (41 ft) goat of the Natural Science Club was featured in the Guinness Book of Records for the first time.
1986		23 December	Fire	The Southern Merchants built their first goat since 1971, and it was burned. From 1986 onwards two goats were built each year, one by the Southern Merchants and one by the School of Vasa.
1987	Heavily fireproofed.	?	Fire	
1988		Survived		Gamblers were for the first time able to gamble on the fate of the goat with English bookmakers.
1989		Prior to assembly / January	Fire / Fire	Financial contributions from the public were raised to rebuild a goat, and the second goat was burnt down in January. In March 1990 another goat was built, this time for the shooting of a Swedish motion picture called Black Jack.

=== 1990–1999 ===
Year	Security additions	Date of destruction	Method of destruction	Notes
1990	The goat was guarded by many volunteers.	Survived		
1991		24 December	Fire	The goat was joined by an advertising sled that turned out to be illegally built. It was later rebuilt to be taken to Stockholm as a part of a protest campaign against the disbandment of the I 14 Infantry Regiment.
1992		After 8 days, and again on 20 December	Fire / Fire	Both the Natural Science Club's and Southern Merchants' goats burned down on the same night. The latter was rebuilt, and burned down on 20 December. The perpetrator of the three attacks was caught and sent to jail. The Goat Committee was founded in 1992.
1993	Guarded by taxi drivers waiting for fares and the Swedish Home Guard	Survived		Once more the goat was featured in the Guinness Book of Records, the School of Vasa's goat measured 14.9 metres (49 ft).
1994		Survived		
1995		25 December	Fire	A Norwegian was arrested for attempting to burn down the goat. It was rebuilt for the 550th anniversary of Gävleborg County.
1996	Monitored by webcams.	Survived		
1997		Survived with damage		Damaged by fireworks. The Natural Science Club's goat was attacked too, but survived with minor damage.
1998		11 December	Fire	Burned down during a major blizzard, and was rebuilt.
1999		Within hours	Fire	The Southern Merchants' goat was rebuilt again before Lucia. The Natural Science Club's goat was also burnt down.

=== 2000–2009 ===
Year	Security additions	Date of destruction	Method of destruction	Notes
2000		Late December	Fire/Drowning	In addition to the Southern Merchants' goat being burned, the Natural Science Club's goat was thrown into the Gävle river.
2001		23 December	Fire	A visitor from Cleveland, Ohio, in the United States, was arrested for burning the goat. The Natural Science Club's goat was also burnt down.
2002	On Saint Lucy's Day, the goat was guarded by Swedish radio and TV personality Gert Fylking.	Survived with damage		A 22 year-old from Stockholm tried to set the Southern Merchants' goat on fire, but failed, the goat receiving only minor damage.
2003		11 December	Fire	A second goat was put up a week after the first one burned down. The second goat survived without any known incidents.
2004		21 December	Fire	
2005		3 December	Fire	Burnt by unknown vandals dressed as Santa and the gingerbread man, by shooting a flaming arrow at the goat. Reconstructed on 5 December. The hunt for the arsonist responsible for the goat-burning in 2005 was featured on the weekly Swedish live broadcast TV3's "Most Wanted" ("Efterlyst") on 8 December.
2006		Survived		The Southern Merchants' goat survived New Year's Eve and was taken down on 2 January. It is now stored in a secret location. Meanwhile, Natural Science Club's goat was burned.
2007		Survived		The Natural Science Club's goat was toppled on 13 December and was burned on the night of 24 December. The Southern Merchants' goat survived.
2008		27 December	Fire	10,000 people turned out for the inauguration of one of the goats. No back-up goat was built to replace the main goat should it be destroyed, nor was the goat treated with flame repellent. (Anna Östman, spokesperson of the Goat Committee, said the repellent made it look ugly in the previous years, like a brown terrier.) On 16 December the Natural Science Club's Goat was vandalised and later removed. On 26 December there was an attempt to burn down the Southern Merchants' Goat but passers-by extinguished the fire. The following day the goat succumbed to the flames ignited by an unknown assailant at 03:50 CET.
2009		23 December	Fire	A person attempted to set the Southern Merchants' goat on fire the night of 7 December. An unsuccessful attempt was made to throw the Natural Science Club's goat into the river the weekend of 11 December. The culprit then tried, again without success, to set the goat on fire. Someone stole the Natural Science Club's goat using a truck on the night of 14 December. On the night of 23 December before 04:00 a.m. the South Merchant goat was set on fire and was burned to the frame, even though it had a thick layer of snow on its back. The goat had two online webcams which were put out of service by a DoS attack, instigated by computer hackers just before the burning.

=== 2010–2019 ===
Year	Security additions	Date of destruction	Method of destruction	Notes
2010		Survived		On the night of 2 December, arsonists made an unsuccessful attempt to burn the Natural Science Club's goat. On 17 December, a Swedish news site reported that one of the guards tasked with protecting the Southern Merchants' goat had been offered SEK 50,000 to leave his post so that the goat could be stolen via helicopter and transported to Stockholm. Both goats survived, were dismantled and returned to storage in early January 2011.
2011	The goat was sprayed with water to create a coating of ice.	2 December	Fire	Mild weather resulted in the protective ice melting. The Natural Science Club Goat was also burned.
2012	The goat was again sprayed with water, which froze in the −12 °C (10 °F) air.	12 December	Fire	At 22:49 on the evening of 12 December, the fire department fireproofed the goat with ice. At 23:46, the official @Gavlebocken account tweeted "feeling good". By 23:56, the goat was on fire. It burned to the ground before emergency services arrived.
2013	The goat was soaked in flame-retardant.	21 December	Fire	The perpetrators filmed themselves setting the goat on fire.
2014		Survived		At least three arson attempts were made, but the goat survived. In January 2015, the goat was transported to Zhuhai, China until being moved back to Sweden in September. The Natural Science Club goat collapsed.
2015		27 December	Fire	A 26 year-old man fleeing the scene with a singed face, smelling of gasoline, and holding a lighter in his hand was arrested. Under questioning, he admitted to committing the offence, adding that he was drunk at the time and that, in retrospect, it was an "extremely bad idea". He was sentenced in January 2018 to probation by an appellate court with a SEK 6,000 fine and SEK 80,000 in damages. The Natural Science Club goat was also burned.
2016		27 November	Fire/Hit by car	The goat was destroyed by an arsonist equipped with petrol on its inauguration day, just hours after its 50th "birthday party". Organizers said they would not rebuild the goat in 2016. The 21 year-old was sentenced to probation by Gävle Tingsrätt and was sentenced to a fine and to pay roughly SEK 100,000 in damages. The evidence mainly revolved around a hat that the perpetrator dropped during his escape. The police later DNA-matched it with the 21-year-old local. It was replaced by the smaller Natural Science Club goat built by local high school students. This goat was later hit by a car.
2017	Double fence, cameras, guards	Survived		The goat was inaugurated on 3 December. No reported attempts to burn the goat were made.
2018	Fencing, cameras, guards, taxi rank to increase numbers of people nearby	Survived with damage		The goat was inaugurated on 2 December. An attempted burning of the Natural Science Club's goat occurred on the night of 15 December, resulting in minor damage to its left front leg.
2019	Double fence, 24-hour CCTV. Two guards patrolled around the goat frequently, 24 hours a day, along with a K9 unit.	Survived		The goat was again inaugurated on 1 December. On 13 December, fire crews responded to a call that the 'little goat' was burning, only to discover it was in fact a miniature Yule goat somebody had brought and torched at the scene. The Natural Science Club goat was burned but not destroyed in the early hours of 27 December. A suspect was taken into custody. This was the first time ever that the goat survived more than two years in a row.

=== 2020–current ===
Year	Security additions	Date of destruction	Method of destruction	Notes
2020	Guards, double fence, 24-hour CCTV, public webcam feed.	Survived		The goat was inaugurated on 29 November. Due to the COVID-19 pandemic, the inauguration was digital, and members of the public were advised not to gather around the goat. There was no traditional celebration. The goat was not harmed during the 2020 holiday season, making 2020 the fourth consecutive year of the goat's survival.
2021		17 December	Fire	The Natural Science Club goat was burned in the early hours of 12 December. The larger goat burned in the early hours of 17 December. A 40 year-old man was arrested and later sentenced to six months in prison and ordered to pay SEK 109,000 in damages to the municipality.
2022	New 24-hour real-time public webcam feed, double fence, 24-hour guards	Survived		The goat was inaugurated on 27 November. Due to a new city centre being built at Slottstorget square, the goat's traditional location, the goat was moved a few blocks north to Rådhusesplanaden. On 1 January, the stream was discontinued, and the goat was taken down the day after.
2023	24-hour guards on site, double fence, 24-hour public webcam stream.	Little by little throughout December	Pecked to pieces by jackdaws (frame remained)	Due to the straw used to construct the goat containing higher than usual amounts of seed, while not destroyed, the goat was severely damaged by flocks of jackdaws foraging for food.
2024	24-hour guards on site, double fence, 24-hour public webcam stream. Better quality straw was used to discourage jackdaws from destroying the goat through foraging.	Survived		Live stream started on 28 November. The official inauguration of the goat was on 1 December. On 13 December, a deepfake hoax of the goat burning down spread on social media. The goat and live stream were taken down on 2 January.
2025	24-hour guards on site, double fence, 24-hour public webcam stream.	27 December	Blown over in a storm	Live stream started on 27 November. The official inauguration of the goat was on 30 November. On 27 December, the goat fell over due to strong winds from Storm Johannes. The goat and live stream were taken down on 29 December.

== IKEA goat in Iceland ==
Since 2010, as a Christmas promotion for the Icelandic branch of IKEA in Garðabær, Iceland, a straw goat inspired by the Gävle goat has been erected outside the store annually. It has also suffered repeated acts of arson, as well as natural damage, including falling over in the wind, and being burnt by lights catching fire. It has also been protected by an electric fence since 2013.

== In popular culture ==
The game Team Fortress 2 pays tribute to it via a community-created map titled "Gavle", which features a snowy town filled with several small straw goats resembling the Gävle Goat, as well as a much larger one at the final part of the map.

== See also ==
- Baby Jesus theft
- Garden gnome liberationists
- Wicker man
