= Sweet Gingerbread Man =

Song by Michel Legrand, Alan and Marilyn Bergman

"Sweet Gingerbread Man" is a song with music by Michel Legrand and lyrics by Alan Bergman and Marilyn Bergman. It was recorded originally for director Leonard Horn's 1970 screen version of Robert T. Westbrook's The Magic Garden of Stanley Sweetheart, a film about young people in Greenwich Village. The song for the film was performed by the Mike Curb Congregation, who went on to record other film songs, including "I Was Born in Love with You", another Legrand/Alan Bergman/Marilyn Bergman composition, this time for the 1970 film version of Wuthering Heights.

Artists who have recorded the song include Sammy Davis Jr., Jack Jones, the Muppets, Bobby Sherman and Sarah Vaughan.

== In popular culture ==
The 1972 Sammy Davis Jr. recording was used in the 2014 film adaptation of La liste de mes envies and in the credits of the third episode of Hawkeye (2021).

The song is played in the 2023 animated film Merry Little Batman when Damian Wayne wanders through the lair of the Joker and finds him having a Christmas party with Poison Ivy, Bane and the Penguin.
