= The Magic Garden of Stanley Sweetheart =

- Official release poster, 1970
- Directed by: Leonard Horn
- Written by: Robert T. Westbrook
- Based on: novel by Robert T. Westbrook
- Produced by: Martin Poll
- Starring: Don Johnson; Dianne Hull; Michael Greer
- Cinematography: Victor Kemper
- Edited by: Nick Archer; Ted Chapman
- Music by: Michel Legrand
- Distributed by: Metro-Goldwyn-Mayer
- Release date: May 26, 1970
- Running time: 117 minutes
- Country: United States
- Language: English

The Magic Garden of Stanley Sweetheart is a 1970 American film distributed by Metro-Goldwyn-Mayer (MGM) about a confused college student's experiences with sex, relationships, and drugs in late 1960s New York City. Produced by Martin Poll and directed by Leonard J. Horn, the film was based on the semi-autobiographical novel of the same name by Robert T. Westbrook, who was also an associate producer of the film. It was the film debut of Don Johnson, who appeared in the title role.

== Plot ==
Stanley Sweetheart (Don Johnson) is an aspiring filmmaker and junior at Columbia University who moved to New York City from Beverly Hills. His father is dead, he is not close to his mother, and his family is running out of money. He lives alone in a Manhattan apartment on the Upper West Side across from a noisy construction site, and seems to have no friends. Bored with his classes and seeking a sexual outlet, he fantasizes about a beautiful blonde classmate. Later, he visits a local bar where he runs into a talkative hippie acquaintance, Barbara (Linda Gillen), who has recently changed her name to Shayne. He has a one-night stand with Barbara, and in the night he sees and is attracted to her beautiful roommate, Andrea (Victoria Racimo). On a later visit to the bar, he meets their friend Danny (Michael Greer), an older and more sophisticated underground musician.

Back on campus, Stanley finally meets and dates the classmate who is the object of his fantasies, Cathy (Dianne Hull). Cathy and Stanley fall in love, but she is a virgin and initially refuses his sexual advances, leaving him frustrated. Finally she agrees to sleep with him and the two settle into happy domestic life for a time, but Stanley soon becomes bored with the relationship and fantasizes about Andrea. When Cathy expresses concern about the promiscuous behavior of her chubby roommate Fran (Holly Near), Stanley invites Fran over under the pretext of filming her for an underground movie called Masturbation. He gets Fran drunk and films her in a variety of sexual positions, culminating with her masturbating in a bathtub, after which Stanley and Fran have sex. He initially feels guilty, but Fran comes to his apartment when Cathy is away and entices him into continuing the affair behind Cathy's back.

Stanley, who by now has dropped out of college, accompanies Danny (who relates that he himself "used to go to Juilliard") to a psychedelic rock concert/ happening in a loft performance space. Soon after, Danny, Barbara and Andrea drop by Stanley's apartment while he is home with Cathy. They all smoke pot together and Stanley finally gets to talk with Andrea, while Cathy is attracted to Danny. Later, Cathy breaks up with Stanley, saying that they haven't loved each other for a long time and she wants to see Danny instead. Stanley gets mad and throws her out of his apartment, but afterwards misses her and unsuccessfully looks for her. He confronts Danny, who admits that he doesn't really care about Cathy, but won't tell her to stop coming around.

Stanley visits Andrea's apartment, where they smoke pot and eventually make love, joined later by Barbara. Stanley moves in with the girls and they form a makeshift family with Stanley as "big daddy", Andrea as "mama" and Barbara as "little sister", and spend their time together getting high, having group sex and exploring Greenwich Village. At first Stanley is the happiest he has ever been in his life, but soon finds himself again losing interest. When he finally sees Cathy at another psychedelic event, he is so high he can't respond to her efforts to talk to him.

Danny shoots himself behind his mother's house. Stanley wakes up at Andrea and Barbara's apartment and tells Andrea he's going uptown to change his clothes. Andrea asks him to please come back, because she needs him. Stanley says he will come back, but as he leaves, it's unclear whether he will actually keep that promise.

== Cast ==
- Don Johnson as Stanley Sweetheart
- Michael Greer as Danny
- Dianne Hull as Cathy
- Linda Gillen (as "Linda Gillin") as Barbara / Shayne
- Victoria Racimo as Andrea
- Holly Near as Fran
- Karen Lynn Gorney as Alicia
- Brandon Maggart as Man In Café

== Production ==
Although Richard Thomas was originally intended to play the lead role of "Stanley Sweetheart", Don Johnson was cast after having been seen in the lead role ("Smitty") of Sal Mineo's Los Angeles stage production of the prison drama Fortune and Men's Eyes. Robert Westbrook has stated that he did not like Johnson, considering him a "hustler of the worst kind" and "utterly miscast", but was overruled by producer Martin Poll.

According to Westbrook, Cathleen (Kate) Heflin (daughter of Van Heflin) was originally signed to play "Cathy", before being replaced by Dianne Hull. Westbrook and Cathleen Heflin later married.

Jolie Jones, daughter of record producer Quincy Jones, was originally cast to play Barbara's roommate, Andrea, but dropped out and was replaced by Victoria Racimo.

Warhol superstar Joe Dallesandro was originally cast as "Danny," Stanley's older, more experienced counterculture friend, but clashed with the assistant director and was fired from the film after only one day. Michael Greer, Johnson's real-life friend who had appeared with him in Fortune and Men's Eyes as his cellmate "Queenie," was then cast in the role.

As reported by The New York Times and other newspapers in October 1969, MGM announced that Andy Warhol would make his commercial film debut in the movie, in his first-ever speaking role as a "freaked-out psychiatrist" in a hallucination orgy scene. It was further reported that Warhol superstars Ultra Violet, Candy Darling, and Gerard Malanga (as well as Joe Dallesandro) had also been cast in the film, with Ultra Violet playing a nurse during the hallucinated orgy scene. Candy Darling was signed to appear in the "Electric Head" sequence of the film, and can be seen in an uncredited brief, wordless cameo reclining on a mattress during the scene where Stanley attends an underground psychedelic performance. Warhol, Malanga and Ultra Violet do not appear in the released film.

The construction shown in the film as taking place across the street from Stanley's apartment (which, according to the movie dialogue, is located on the Upper West Side of Manhattan near Columbia University and the Juilliard School) is actually real-life footage of the early construction of the World Trade Center.

The film was initially rated "X", but was changed to "R" after MGM agreed to two minor cuts.

== Reception ==
The movie was a box office flop and resulted in MGM dropping Don Johnson. Johnson later said, "It was a big book during that era, but as a movie, it damn near buried me! It damn near sent me back to Missouri!" Robert Westbrook has theorized that "the 60s were over-exploited by the media, and when the movie came out in 1970 everyone was completely sick of the whole sex/drugs/hippie thing."

Critics also disliked the film, viewing it as a dated attempt to exploit the market for youth-oriented films. Vincent Canby called it "calculatingly bland" and Charles Champlin deemed it a "disaster" and a "vile little turn-on". Gene Siskel gave the film zero stars out of four, calling it "an insult to the young people it is trying to lure." The film's reputation did not improve with time; Leonard Maltin's 2015 movie guide described it as "vapid" and gave it one and a half stars.

Warhol nevertheless praised the film as "the quintessential, most truthful studio-made film about the '60s counterculture". In The Andy Warhol Diaries, Warhol recounted that Martin Poll had approached him in 1986 about doing a movie on Warhol's life story, to which Warhol responded that "a wonderful movie had already been made on the sixties, and he should just remake it — The Magic Garden of Stanley Sweetheart."

The film has never had an official release on VHS, DVD, or Blu-ray.

== Music ==
The film introduced the song "Sweet Gingerbread Man", composed by Michel Legrand (music) and Alan and Marilyn Bergman (lyrics). It was performed on the film's soundtrack by The Mike Curb Congregation. Released as a single to promote the soundtrack album, the song was a minor hit, reaching #16 on the Billboard Adult Contemporary chart. It was subsequently covered by numerous artists, including Sammy Davis Jr., Jack Jones, Bobby Sherman, Sarah Vaughan, and Australian pop singer Dave Allenby. In 1977, the song was performed by Muppet gingerbread men on Episode #201 of The Muppet Show.

The film's opening theme song, "Nobody Knows", also composed by Legrand/ Bergman/ Bergman and performed in the film by Bill Medley, has also been covered a number of times, including by Natalie Cole, Lena Horne, Jack Jones, and Kiri Te Kanawa.

MGM released a soundtrack album for the film including various artists, such as Bill Medley, Eric Burdon and War, The Mike Curb Congregation, David Lucas, Crow, Angeline Butler, and Michael Greer.
