= Lyrically, Alan Bergman =

Studio album by Alan Bergman
- Released: May 8, 2007
- Recorded: 2007
- Genre: Vocal jazz
- Length: 55:24
- Label: Verve
- Producer: Alan Bergman

Professional ratings
Review scores
| Source | Rating |
|---|---|
| Allmusic | 3/5 stars |

Lyrically, Alan Bergman is the debut album by American lyricist Alan Bergman. It was recorded in 2007 and released later that year by Verve Records. The album consists of songs with lyrics by Bergman and his wife, Marilyn Bergman (née Keith). Alan and Marilyn Bergman have been nominated fifteen times for the Academy Award for Best Original Song, and have won twice, at the 41st Academy Awards for "Windmills of Your Mind", and for "The Way We Were" at the 46th Academy Awards, both winning songs are featured on this album.

== Track listing ==
1. "The Windmills of Your Mind" (Michel Legrand) – 3:41
2. "Nice 'n' Easy" (Lew Spence) – 3:02
3. "The Summer Knows" (Legrand) – 4:29
4. "It Might Be You" (Dave Grusin) – 3:31
5. "What Are You Doing the Rest of Your Life?" (Legrand) – 4:36
6. "That Face" (Spence) – 3:40
7. "Love Like Ours" (Grusin) – 3:47
8. "You Don't Bring Me Flowers" (Neil Diamond) – 3:01
9. "Where Do You Start?" (Johnny Mandel) – 4:43
10. "How Do You Keep the Music Playing?" (Legrand) – 4:03
11. "And I'll Be There" (Grusin) – 3:48
12. "The Way We Were" (Marvin Hamlisch) – 4:35
13. "What Matters Most" (Grusin) – 2:24

All lyrics by Alan and Marilyn Bergman, except "That Face", lyrics by Alan Bergman. Composers indicated.

== Personnel ==
=== Performance ===
- Alan Bergman – vocal, producer
- Till Brönner – trumpet
- Frank Chastenier – piano
- Randy Waldman
- Christian McBride – double bass
- Jeff Hamilton – drums
- Jörg Achim Keller – arranger
- Jeremy Lubbock

=== Production ===
- Marilyn Bergman – liner notes
- Jim Britt – cover photo
- Lisa Hansen – release coordinator
- Cameron Mizell
- John Newcott
- Spike Nannarello – photography
- Al Schmitt – recording engineer
- Bill Smith - recording engineer / Pro Tools editing
