= Sheilah Graham =

American gossip columnist (1904–1988)

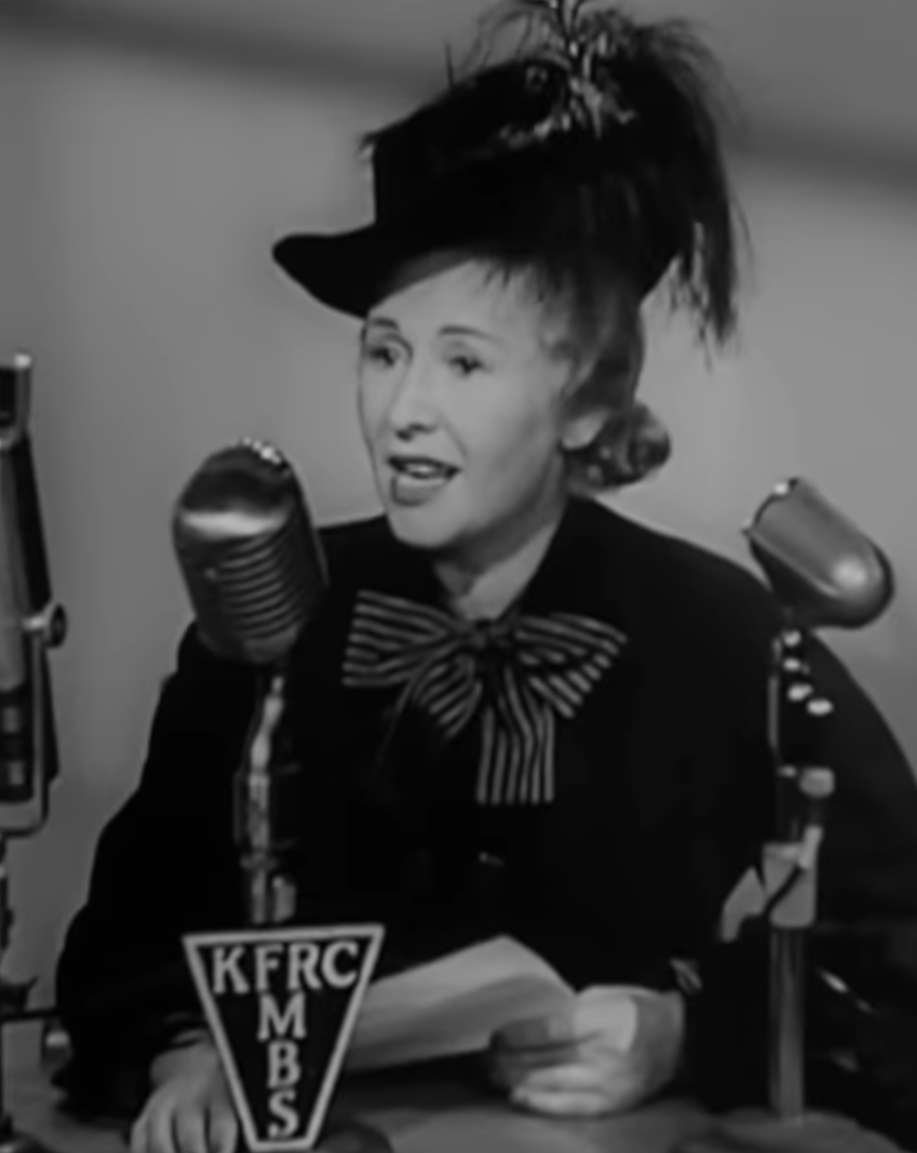
- Graham in Impact (1949)
- Born: Lily Shiel; 15 September 1904; Leeds, West Yorkshire, England, UK
- Died: 17 November 1988 (aged 84); West Palm Beach, Florida, U.S.
- Occupations: Gossip columnist; author; actress
- Spouses: John Graham Gillam (1925–1937); Trevor Westbrook (1941–1946); Wojciechowicz Wojtkiewicz (1953–1956)
- Partner(s): F. Scott Fitzgerald (14 July 1937–1940)
- Children: 2, including Robert T. Westbrook
- Writing career
- Pen name: Sheilah Graham
- Period: c. 1924 – 1985
- Subjects: Celebrities, Popular culture, Hollywood

Sheilah Graham (born Lily Shiel; 15 September 1904 – 17 November 1988) was a British-born, internationally syndicated American gossip columnist during Hollywood's "Golden Age". In her youth, she had been a showgirl and a freelance writer for Fleet Street in London. These early experiences would converge in her career in Hollywood, which spanned nearly four decades, as a successful columnist and author.

Graham was also known for her relationship with F. Scott Fitzgerald, a relationship she played a significant role in immortalizing through a memoir she wrote together with Gerold Frank, Beloved Infidel, a bestseller that was made into a 1959 film starring Gregory Peck and Deborah Kerr.

== Early life ==
Graham was born Lily Shiel in Leeds, England, the youngest of Rebecca (Blashman) and Louis Shiel's eight children (two of whom died). Her parents were Ukrainian Jews. Her father, a tailor who had fled the pogroms, died of tuberculosis on a trip to Berlin while his daughter was still an infant. Her mother and the children moved to a basement flat in a Stepney Green slum in the East End of London. Rebecca, who spoke little English, struggled to provide for her family by cleaning public lavatories and was forced by these circumstances to place Lily in the Jews Hospital and Orphanage. Later, in her professional and social adult life, Sheilah Graham kept her Jewish background a secret, although eventually it became an open one.

In Recollections of Sheilah Graham, Sheilah's daughter, Wendy Fairey, wrote: "Entering this institution at age six, my mother had her golden hair shaved to the scalp as a precaution against lice. To the end of her life, she was haunted by the degradation of this experience. Eight years later when she 'graduated,' she had established herself as Norwood's 'Head Girl': captain of the cricket team and recipient of many prizes, including both the Hebrew prize and a prize for reciting a poem by Elizabeth Barrett Browning".

Graham, then still known as Lily, had been trained for a career in teaching. When she left the orphanage, her mother was dying of cancer, and Graham returned home to care for her.

=== Marriage to John Graham Gillam ===
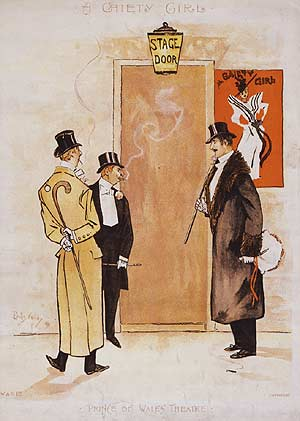
Stage Door Johnnies wait for the lady performers at the stage door after Edwardian musical comedies

After her mother died, the 16-year-old Graham moved into a tiny flat in London's West End and took a job in a department store demonstrating a specialty toothbrush. In 1925, at the age of 20, she married Major John Graham Gillam (1884–1965), a decorated WWI officer, published author, and eyewitness to the Gallipoli campaign of 1915–1916. Sheilah’s daughter describes Gillam as "a kindly older man who proved impotent, went bankrupt, and looked the other way when she went out with other men."

During this marriage, largely through the tutelage of her husband, Graham improved her speech and manners. She also enrolled in the Royal Academy of Dramatic Art, changed her name, and became a music hall dancer as a "Cochran's girl", including in One Dam' Thing after Another, (1927). It was during her time in the British musical theater that Graham began to write professionally, anecdotally receiving two guineas (£2.10) from the Daily Express for an article entitled "The Stage Door Johnnies, by a Chorus Girl," which she wrote in response to a challenge by her husband. While still in Britain, she attained some success as a freelance writer and published two novels, both of which sold poorly.

== Early career ==
In 1933, she moved to the US. Her modest, youthful success as a writer enabled her to land jobs as a staff reporter in New York City, working successively for the New York Mirror and the New York Evening Journal. She energetically pursued scoops and wrote features with sensational headlines like "Who Cheats Most in Marriage?," a survey comparing the infidelities of various nationalities of men.

In 1935, John Neville Wheeler, head of the North American Newspaper Alliance, which was becoming the preeminent press service, recruited her to write NANA's syndicated Hollywood column and she moved to Los Angeles. She described having "landed in the film capital on two left feet" and needing to temper her brash outspokenness with film industry sensibilities. In her autobiographical book A College of One, she relates the dichotomy between dealing with "notoriously ignorant" filmmakers and the discomfort she felt over her own limited education and background in the company of her colleagues in journalism and screenwriters, mentioning Robert Benchley, Marc Connelly, Dorothy Parker and F. Scott Fitzgerald, with whom she would soon become an intimate companion. She felt more at home in Hollywood than New York saying that "Hollywood was notorious even in London for the ignorance of the people who made films - no one (here) could embarrass me with erudite conversation."

=== The Hollywood years and Fitzgerald ===
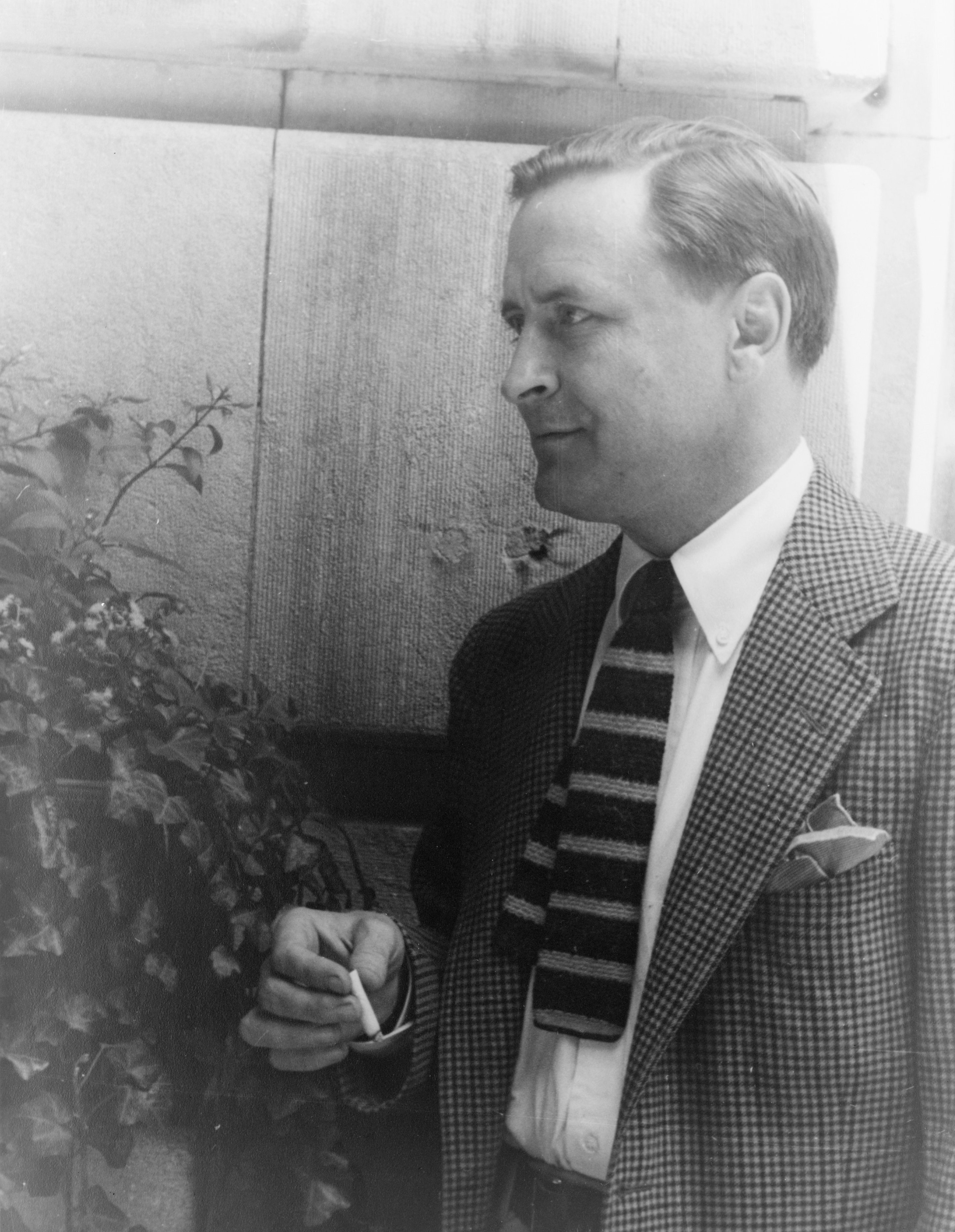
F. Scott Fitzgerald in 1937, three years before his death

Although marked by an inauspicious start, Graham quickly rose to fame through her column, "Hollywood Today," which she wrote daily for over 35 years, interrupted only by serving as a war correspondent during World War II. By 1964, Time magazine claimed she had "deposed [Hedda] Hopper and [Louella] Parsons as doyennne of the Hollywood columnists." The column at its peak was carried in 178 papers in 1966, compared to 100 papers for Parsons, who had retired from writing her column in 1965, and 68 for Hopper, who died in 1966. Along with these two rivals, Graham came to wield sufficient power to make or break Hollywood careers—prompting her to describe herself as "the last of the unholy trio."

She divorced John Gillam in June 1937 (but she supported him until the end of his life) and became engaged to the Marquess of Donegall (Edward Chichester), a journalist she had met in London, before she moved to America. At a Hollywood party given by Robert Benchley in July 1937 to celebrate the engagement, she first set eyes on F. Scott Fitzgerald. A few days later, after the Marquess had left to return to London, she met Fitzgerald at a Writer's Guild dinner dance, and a romance began. She relates having immediately fallen in love with Fitzgerald, and the engagement with Chichester was broken soon thereafter. Ruthe Stein quotes her as saying, "I'll only be remembered, if I'm remembered at all, because of Scott Fitzgerald."

They shared a home and were constant companions while Fitzgerald was still married to his wife Zelda, who was institutionalized in an asylum. Nonetheless, Graham protested at being described as his "mistress" in her book The Rest of the Story on the basis that she was "a woman who loved Scott Fitzgerald for better or worse until he died."

It was she who found his body in 1940 in the living room of her West Hollywood, California, apartment, where he had died of a heart attack. They had been together only three and a half years, but her daughter reports that Graham "never really got over him." During those three years, Scott outlined an educational "curriculum" for her and guided her through it, which she later wrote about in detail in A College of One. Although Graham kept her Jewish background a secret from most, she did reveal it to Fitzgerald, perhaps in part to confront his possible antisemitism at the time of Nazi power in Germany. He wrote her a poem, "For Shielah [sic], a Beloved Infidel," in 1937, not long after they met, but aside from the word, "infidel," in the title, there is no reference in it to her Jewishness (the poem is a proclamation of his gratitude for the charming ways and expressions she had learned from being with other men before him). Graham's memoir, which she titled after the poem (which is included in it), does not mention her Jewish background.

=== Brief return to the UK ===
Upon Fitzgerald's death, seeking a respite from the social demands and frantic pace of her life, Graham arranged for an assignment as a foreign correspondent in NANA's London bureau. This afforded her the opportunity to demonstrate her abilities as a serious journalist. Her first major story from the UK was an in-depth interview with George Bernard Shaw, and she later filed another with Winston Churchill. Her brief respite from Hollywood lasted until the conclusion of World War II.

In the UK, she met Trevor Cresswell Lawrence Westbrook, whose company manufactured Spitfire fighter planes for the Royal Air Force.

=== Return to the US ===
After her return to the United States in late 1941, Graham and Westbrook married. Graham's two children, Wendy and Robert, were born during this marriage, which ended in divorce in 1946. Wendy, in her autobiographical book One of the Family, writes of discovering as an adult that her father was, in fact, British philosopher A. J. Ayer; Ayer reportedly suggested that Robert Westbrook's biological father was probably actor Robert Taylor.

In August 1947, Graham was naturalized under the name Sheila Westbrook with her arrival in the US dated 1934, as a United States citizen. In February 1953, she married her third husband, Wojciechowicz Stanislavovich (W.S.) Wojtkiewicz,, a boys camp athletic director, known in Hollywood circles as "Bow Wow". During their divorce proceedings, she accused him of, among other things, running a restaurant out of their home, which he denied. In her autobiography, Graham dismissed Wojtkiewicz as "that nut whose name you can't pronounce". He would later gain infamy for mounting Chill Wills's notorious Oscar campaign

Neither her foreign correspondence nor motherhood prevented Graham from achieving her ambitions. She demanded $5,000 per week to resume her column, an amount comparable to that of the stars she was covering. In addition, she was a regular contributor to Photoplay and had her own radio program, which moved to television in 1951, whereon she delivered commentary and celebrity interviews—a forerunner to the talk show. From February 25, 1952 until April 24, 1953, Daily Variety carried a separate daily gossip column by Graham that differed in content, style, and attention to precise accuracy, from that which she wrote for the general public. Army Archerd took over writing the Just For Variety column from her.

== Later years and death ==
In 1957, Graham guest-starred as herself in "Academy Award," an episode of the CBS situation comedy Mr. Adams and Eve.

In April 1969, Graham changed the name and format of her syndicated column, citing waning public interest in Hollywood gossip. Retitled "Hollywood Everywhere," the scope included celebrities, public figures, and diverse commentary.

In 1971, Graham wrote her last syndicated column and moved to Palm Beach, Florida, where she continued for several years to make celebrity guest appearances on television, wrote on a freelance basis for magazines, and authored nine more books. She co-starred in the 1978 talk show America Alive!, in its "gossip check" segment.

Graham died on 17 November 1988, at the Good Samaritan Hospital in West Palm Beach, Florida, of congestive heart failure at the age of 84.

== Books ==
- Gentleman-Crook. A Novel. (1933)
- One other early novel, unknown title, published in Britain before 1935.
- Film-Struck (about 1941)
- Beloved Infidel: The Education of a Woman (1958, with Gerold Frank)
- Rest of the Story: The Odyssey of a Modern Woman (1964)
- College of One: The Story of How F. Scott Fitzgerald Educated the Woman He Loved (1967)
- Confessions of a Hollywood Columnist (1969)
- Garden of Allah (1969)
- Scratch an Actor (1970)
- A State of Heat (1972, memoir)
- How to Marry Super Rich: Or, Love, Money and the Morning After (1974)
- For Richer, for Poorer (1975)
- The Real F. Scott Fitzgerald, Thirty-Five Years Later (1976)
- The Late Lily Shiel (1978)
- My Hollywood: A Celebration and a Lament (1984)
- Hollywood Revisited: A Fiftieth Anniversary Celebration (1985)

== Filmography ==
Film
Year	Film	Role	Notes
1939	That's Right – You're Wrong	Sheilah Graham – Newspaper Columnist	Uncredited
1947	Jiggs and Maggie in Society	Herself	
1949	Impact	Herself	
1950	The Great Jewel Robber	Television Commentator	Uncredited
1959	Girls Town	Sister Grace	
1960	College Confidential	Reporter	(final film role)
Television
Year	Title	Role	Notes
1958	The Bob Cummings Show	Sheilah Graham	1 episode
1959	General Electric Theater	Aunt Cecilia	1 episode
