= Alan and Marilyn Bergman =

American lyricists and songwriters

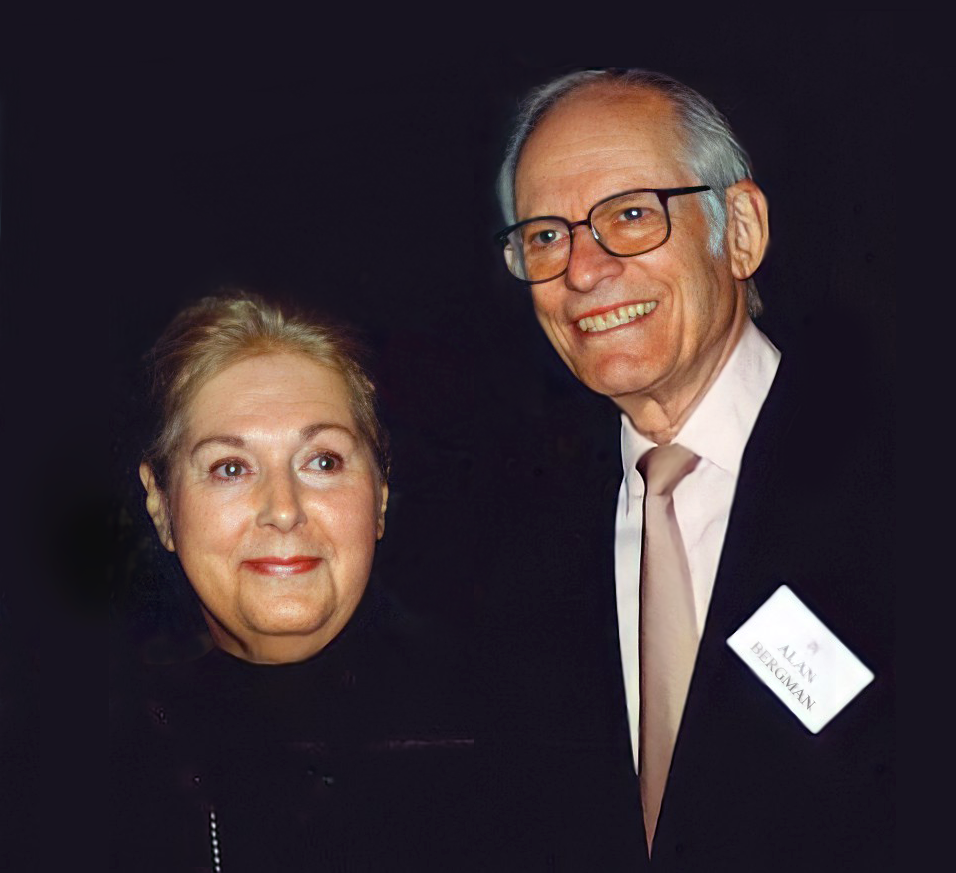
- Marilyn and Alan Bergman in 2002
- Occupation: Songwriters
- Years active: 1950s–2017
- Notable work: See notable works
- Children: 1
- Alan Bergman
- Born: September 11, 1925; New York City, U.S.
- Died: July 17, 2025 (aged 99); Los Angeles, California, U.S.
- Education: University of North Carolina at Chapel Hill; University of California, Los Angeles
- Spouse: Marilyn Katz (m. 1958; died 2022)
- Marilyn Bergman
- Birth name: Marilyn Keith Katz
- Born: November 10, 1928; New York City, U.S.
- Died: January 8, 2022 (aged 93); Los Angeles, California, U.S.
- Education: The High School of Music & Art; New York University
- Spouse: Alan Bergman (m. 1958)

Alan Bergman (September 11, 1925 – July 17, 2025) and Marilyn Keith Bergman (née Katz; November 10, 1928 – January 8, 2022) were an American songwriting duo. Married from 1958 until Marilyn's death, together they wrote music and lyrics for numerous celebrated television, film, and stage productions. The Bergmans enjoyed a successful career, honored with four Emmys, three Oscars, and two Grammys (including Song of the Year). They are in the Songwriters Hall of Fame.

== Personal life ==
Alan Bergman was born on September 11, 1925, in Crown Heights, Brooklyn. He was the son of Ruth (Margulies), a homemaker and community volunteer, and Samuel Bergman, who worked in children's clothing sales. Bergman studied at the University of North Carolina at Chapel Hill and earned his master's degree in music at the University of California, Los Angeles (UCLA).

Marilyn Bergman was born on November 10, 1928, also in Crown Heights – coincidentally, at the same hospital (Brooklyn Jewish Hospital and Medical Center) where Alan was born three years earlier. She was the daughter of Edith (Arkin) and Albert A. Katz. Marilyn studied music at The High School of Music & Art in New York, before studying psychology and English at New York University.

Both Alan and Marilyn were from Jewish families. Despite the geographical proximity of their upbringing, the Bergmans did not meet until they had both moved to Los Angeles in the late 1950s. They married in 1958 and had a daughter, Julie Bergman Sender, who works as an independent film producer.

Marilyn Bergman died from respiratory failure on January 8, 2022, at the age of 93. Alan Bergman died of natural causes at his home in Los Angeles, on July 17, 2025, at the age of 99.

== Career ==
Alan Bergman worked as a television director and songwriter at Philadelphia's WCAU-TV in the early 1950s. Johnny Mercer encouraged him to move to Los Angeles and become a professional songwriter. Marilyn had moved to California and was friends with songwriter Bob Russell and his wife, Anna, and later described "drifting into songwriting really by accident because I had a fall and broke my shoulder and couldn't play piano so I started writing lyrics". Marilyn also felt that she lacked the discipline or talent required to become a concert pianist. The Bergmans had both become collaborators with composer Lew Spence and only met when Spence suggested they all work together.

With Spence, the Bergmans wrote the lyrics for the title tracks for Dean Martin's 1958 album Sleep Warm and Frank Sinatra's 1960 album Nice 'n' Easy. In 1961, the Bergmans wrote their first title song for a motion picture, for The Right Approach, composed by Spence. In 1964, the Bergmans wrote lyrics to their first Broadway musical, Something More!, to music by Sammy Fain.

The Bergmans wrote lyrics for "In the Heat of the Night", with music by Quincy Jones, for the 1967 film of the same name, which has been described as their "breakthrough". The couple later worked with Jones on Michael Jackson's soundtrack album for E.T. the Extra-Terrestrial (1982), writing the lyrics for "Someone In the Dark", and the 2007 Ennio Morricone tribute album We All Love Ennio Morricone, for which they wrote lyrics to "I Knew I Loved You", which was sung by Celine Dion.

The Bergmans' long relationship with the French composer Michel Legrand began in the late 1960s. The couple wrote English lyrics for Legrand's song "The Windmills of Your Mind", featured in The Thomas Crown Affair (1968), which won them their first Academy Award for Best Original Song at the 41st Academy Awards in 1969. The Bergmans and Legrand were subsequently nominated for the Best Original Song award in the following two years for "What Are You Doing the Rest of Your Life?" from The Happy Ending (1969), and "Pieces of Dreams" from the 1970 film of the same name. The couple's minor work with Legrand in this period included the contrafactum (rather than a translation) "You Must Believe in Spring" of Maxence's song from the film The Young Girls of Rochefort, "Listen to the Sea" from Ice Station Zebra (1968), and "Nobody Knows" and "Sweet Gingerbread Man" from The Magic Garden of Stanley Sweetheart (1970). Legrand also featured eight of the Bergmans' lyrics on his 1972 album with Sarah Vaughan.

The Bergmans teamed up with Marvin Hamlisch to write Barbra Streisand's hit "The Way We Were" used in the film of the same name. The song was labeled by Turner Classic Movies's Andrea Passafiume as "one of the most recognizable songs in the world". Hamlisch and the Bergmans won the Academy Award for Best Original Song at the 46th Academy Awards, the Golden Globe Award for Best Original Song in 1974, and the Grammy Award for Song of the Year in 1975. According to the National Endowment for the Arts and Recording Industry Association of America (RIAA) in their list of the top 365 "Songs of the Century", the single was placed at number 298.

In 1983, at the 55th Academy Awards, the Bergmans' work on "How Do You Keep the Music Playing?" (composed by Legrand for the film Best Friends) was nominated for the Best Original Song award. The Bergmans became the first songwriters ever to have written three of the five nominations for the Academy Award for Best Song, being nominated for "It Might Be You" from Tootsie (composed by Dave Grusin), and "If We Were in Love" from Yes, Giorgio (composed by John Williams), in addition to "How Do You Keep the Music Playing?". At the subsequent Academy Awards, their work with Legrand on the 1983 film Yentl won them the Academy Award for Best Original Song Score or Adaptation Score, with the songs "Papa, Can You Hear Me?" and "The Way He Makes Me Feel" from the film also being nominated for the Best Original Song award.

The Bergmans were also co-writers of "An American Reunion", the opening ceremony of the inaugural festivities at Washington D.C.'s Lincoln Memorial that marked Bill Clinton's first term as President of the United States in January 1993. In the late 1990s, the Bergmans received their final nominations for the Academy Award for Best Original Song, for "Moonlight" (composed by John Williams) for the 1995 film Sabrina and "Love Is Where You Are" (music by Mark Isham) for the 1999 film At First Sight. Also in 1999, the Bergmans received their last Primetime Emmy Award for Outstanding Original Music and Lyrics for "A Time to Dream"" (music by Hamlisch) for the AFI's AFI's 100 Years 100 Movies Special.

When the Kennedy Center commissioned the Bergmans to write a song cycle in 2001, they chose to collaborate with composer Cy Coleman. The resulting work, Portraits in Jazz: A Gallery of Songs, was performed on May 17, 2002. The Bergmans wrote the lyrics to Billy Goldenberg's television musical Queen of the Stardust Ballroom which won the couple their third Primetime Emmy Award Outstanding Achievement in Special Musical Material, it was later the couple's second Broadway show, Ballroom, which opened in 1978.

In 2007, Alan Bergman released his first album as a vocalist, Lyrically, Alan Bergman, featuring lyrics by him and his wife, arranged by Alan Broadbent and Jeremy Lubbock. Reviewing the album for AllMusic, John Bush praised Bergman's "excellent interpretive skills", and Christopher Loundon in JazzTimes described Bergman's voice as a "...revelation, suggesting both the wise, elder Sinatra and the astutely mellow Fred Astaire, with a touch of the offbeat dreaminess of Chet Baker."

The Bergmans had a long professional relationship with Barbra Streisand. In addition to their work on the films Yentl and The Way We Were, in which she starred, the Bergmans wrote Streisand's One Voice concert that was released as a live album in 1987. Marilyn also served as the executive producer of One Voice. The Bergmans' song "Ordinary Miracles", from Streisand's 1994 concert tour and HBO special, won the couple their third Emmy Award; their script for the tour was nominated for a CableACE Award.

The Bergmans received their fifth Emmy nomination for "On the Way to Becoming Me" (music by Marvin Hamlisch) from the AFI tribute to Streisand, and also served on the board of Streisand's charitable foundation. Streisand's 2011 album What Matters Most was recorded in tribute to the Bergmans and featured ten songs by the couple that Streisand had not previously recorded.

In 2017, the Bergmans collaborated with playwright Josh Ravetch on Chasing Mem'ries: A Different Kind of Musical, which opened at the Geffen Playhouse and was the recipient of the Edgerton Foundation New Play Award. In 2020, Alan collaborated with Ravetch on the sequel to Chasing Mem'ries, A Different Kind of Musical, Backyard Mem'ries, which was workshopped later that year. Bergman continued his collaboration with Ravetch on a one-woman show featuring supermodel Beverly Johnson. Beverly Johnson: In Vogue opened in 2024 on the 50th anniversary of Johnson becoming the first black woman to grace the cover of American Vogue magazine. Bergman and composer Greg Phillinganes wrote the show's signature song, "The Road is Long and the River Wide", for the off-Broadway opening at 59E59.

Bergman's final collaboration with Ravetch was the play Are We Alone? on which Ravetch collaborated with Harvard astrophysicist Professor Avi Loeb. "We May Not Be Alone", with music by Michel Legrand, underscores a montage of the greatest scientific breakthroughs from Galileo to the JWST. The play received a workshop production in Cambridge, Massachusetts, in 2025 and is slated to open in 2026.

The Bergmans received numerous academic honors and lifetime achievement awards. They were inducted into the Songwriters Hall of Fame in 1980, and subsequently received the Johnny Mercer Award in 1997. The Bergmans were awarded honorary doctorates by the Berklee College of Music in 1995. They also received the Lifetime Achievement Award from the National Academy of Songwriters that year. In 1996, the couple were the recipients of the inaugural Fiorello Lifetime Achievement Award from New York City's Fiorello H. LaGuardia High School. The Bergmans were later inducted into the LaGuardia High School's Hall of Fame. In 1986, Marilyn was awarded the Women in Film Crystal Award. Marilyn was later appointed an Officer of the Order of Arts and Letters by the French Ministry of Culture in 1996. In 1998, Marilyn received an Honorary doctorate from Trinity College in Hartford, Connecticut, and in 2011, Alan was presented with a Distinguished Alumnus award from his alma mater, the University of North Carolina. The Bergmans were the recipients of the National Music Publishers Association Lifetime Achievement Award in 2002, Marilyn was also the recipient of the Creative Arts Award from the Kaufman Cultural Center that same year.

The Bergmans held several executive positions in organizations connected with the arts. Marilyn served as the president and chairman of the board of the American Society of Composers, Authors and Publishers (ASCAP) for 15 years, from 1994 to 2009. Bergman was elected president and chairman after she had served five terms, since 1984, as the first woman ever to serve on ASCAP's board of directors. She completed her term as president in April 2009 and continued to serve on the board of ASCAP. Marilyn also served two terms as president of CISAC, The International Confederation of Performing Rights Societies.

Alan served on the boards of directors of The Johnny Mercer Foundation, The Artists' Rights Foundation, and The Jazz Bakery. The Bergmans also served on the executive committee of the Music Branch of the Academy of Motion Picture Arts and Sciences and were board members of the National Academy of Songwriters. Marilyn also served as president of the National Recording Preservation Board.

In 2022, Marilyn was inducted into the Women Songwriters Hall of Fame.

== Notable works ==
Notable lyrics and compositions by the Bergmans include:

- "The Windmills of Your Mind" (music by Michel Legrand) for 1968 movie The Thomas Crown Affair
- "The Way We Were" (music by Marvin Hamlisch) for 1973 movie The Way We Were
- "Sleep Warm" (music by Lew Spence) for Dean Martin's 1958 album Sleep Warm
- "Yellow Bird" written for Norman Luboff's arrangement of the creole song "Choucoune"
- "Nice 'n' Easy" (music by Lew Spence) for Frank Sinatra's 1960 album Nice 'n' Easy
- "Champion the Wonder Horse" (music by Norman Luboff), for The Adventures of Champion; also recorded by Frankie Laine.
- "You Don't Bring Me Flowers" (music by Neil Diamond), originally written for All That Glitters but unused, was expanded by Diamond and released on his 1977 album I'm Glad You're Here with Me Tonight. Streisand released a solo rendition on her 1978 album Songbird, and later that year she and Diamond recorded the song as a duet
- "Someone In the Dark" (music by Rod Temperton) for Michael Jackson's soundtrack album for E.T. the Extra-Terrestrial (1982)
- "Soldiers in the Rain" (music by Henry Mancini); sung by Diana Krall on Dave Grusin's 1997 album Two for the Road
- "The Playground" (music by Bill Evans) for Tony Bennett's album The Playground (1998)
- "I Knew I Loved You" (music by Ennio Morricone) recorded by Céline Dion for the Morricone tribute album We All Love Ennio Morricone (2007)
- "Sing About Me, I'm Dying of Thirst" for Kendrick Lamar's Good Kid, M.A.A.D City (2012)
- "It Might Be You (Music by Dave Grusin) from the film Tootsie (1982)

Musicals

- Something More! (1964, composed by Sammy Fain)
- Ballroom (1978, composed by Billy Goldenberg)
- Chasing Mem'ries a Different kind of musical (2017
  - Written and directed by Josh Ravetch. Composed by Marvin Hamlisch and Michel Legrand
  - starring Tony Award winner Tyne Daly and Oscar-nominated Robert Forster.
  - Winner of the Edgerton New Play Award

Films

- "The Right Approach" (music by Lew Spence) – The Right Approach (1961)
- "In the Heat of the Night" and "Foul Owl on the Prowl" (music by Quincy Jones) – In the Heat of the Night (1967)
- English lyrics for "The Windmills of Your Mind" (music by Michel Legrand) – The Thomas Crown Affair (1968)
- "What Are You Doing the Rest of Your Life?" (music by Michel Legrand) – The Happy Ending (1969)
- "Pieces of Dreams" (music by Michel Legrand) – Pieces of Dreams (1970)
- "Listen to the Sea" (music by Michel Legrand) – Ice Station Zebra (1968)
- "Tomorrow Is My Friend" and "There's Enough to go Around" Gaily, Gaily (1969)
- "Nobody Knows" and "Sweet Gingerbread Man" (music by Michel Legrand) – The Magic Garden of Stanley Sweetheart (1970)
- "All His Children" (music by Henry Mancini) – Sometimes a Great Notion (1971)
- "Marmalade, Molasses & Honey" (music by Maurice Jarre) – The Life and Times of Judge Roy Bean (1972)
- "Summer Wishes, Winter Dreams" (music by Johnny Mandel) – Summer Wishes, Winter Dreams (1973)
- "The Way We Were" (music by Marvin Hamlisch) – The Way We Were (1973)
- "Sybil" (music by Leonard Rosenman) – Sybil (1976)
- "The Last Time I Felt Like This" (music by Marvin Hamlisch) – Same Time, Next Year (1978)
- "I'll Never Say Goodbye" (music by David Shire) – The Promise (1979)
- "Where Do You Catch the Bus for Tomorrow?" (music by Henry Mancini) - A Change of Seasons (1980)
- "It Might Be You" (music by Dave Grusin) – Tootsie (1982)
- "If We Were In Love" (music by John Williams) – Yes, Giorgio (1982)
- "How Do You Keep the Music Playing?" (music by Michel Legrand) – Best Friends (1982)
- Lyrics for Michel Legrand's score for Yentl (1983)
- "Never Say Never Again" – (music by Michel Legrand) − Never Say Never Again (1983)
- "The Girl Who Used to Be Me" (music by Marvin Hamlisch) – Shirley Valentine (1989)
- "Moonlight" (music by John Williams) – Sabrina (1995)
- "Love Is Where You Are" (music by Mark Isham) – At First Sight (1999)

Television

- With Dave Grusin, the Bergmans wrote the theme songs for the television series The Sandy Duncan Show (1972), Maude ("And Then There's Maude", 1972), and Good Times (1974). The Bergmans also wrote "Worlds" for the series Bracken's World (1969), and the theme for Alice ("There's a New Girl In Town", 1976), with David Shire.
- Lyrics for Billy Goldenberg's score for Queen of the Stardust Ballroom (1975)
- "Ordinary Miracles" for Barbra Streisand's HBO concert special (1994)
- "A Ticket to Dream" (music by Marvin Hamlisch) for the AFI 100 Years 100 Movies Special (1999)

Stage plays

- Beverly Johnson: In Vogue off-Broadway Were Not Much Closer to the Other Side Written and directed by Josh
- Are We Alone? Written by Harvard astrophysicist Avi Loeb and Josh Ravetch. Directed by Josh Ravetch

Alan Bergman song, "The Stars Have Mem'ries"

Alan Bergman wrote every day.
