= Hunter (1973 film) =

- Directed by: Leonard Horn
- Written by: Cliff Gould
- Starring: John Vernon; Steve Ihnat; Sabrina Scharf; Edward Binns; Fritz Weaver; Ed Flanders
- Music by: Lalo Schifrin
- Release date: 1973

Hunter is a 1973 film directed by Leonard Horn and written by Cliff Gould, starring John Vernon, involving the kidnapping and brainwashing of a race car driver, Alain Praetorious, in order to turn him into an assassin against America. The torture used against him involves forcing him to watch footage of the Winged monkeys from The Wizard of Oz movie, a-la A Clockwork Orange, giving rise to the pop-culture catch phrase "Please, stop the monkeys!"

The movie stars John Vernon as David Hunter, with Steve Ihnat (Alain Praetorious), Edward Binns (Owen Larkdale), Sabrina Scharf (Anne Novak), and Fritz Weaver (Cirrak). Ramon Bieri plays Mishani, and Ed Flanders plays Dr. Miles.
