= Baby Jesus theft =

Theft of infant Jesus figurines

Baby Jesus theft is the theft of figurines of the infant Jesus from outdoor public and private nativity displays during the Christmas season. It is an "enduring (and illegal) practice" according to New York Times journalist Katie Rogers, "believed to be part of a yearly tradition, often carried out by bored teenagers looking for an easy prank." Sometimes these are stolen for resale, other times the associated pranks are more involved and include dropping it off somewhere else.

The prevalence of such thefts has caused some owners of outdoor manger scenes to protect their property with GPS devices or surveillance cameras, or to remove baby Jesus from the displays outside of specific requests or public showings. Occasionally the figurines are returned.

== Incidents ==
=== Canada ===
In 2012 and 2014 a baby Jesus was stolen from displays in North Vancouver, the latter one a storied figurine that had been on display for 50 years in Vancouver's St. Vincent's Hospital. Father John Horgan, the pastor of the church which hosted the display, said "It’s a terrible day if we have to microchip the Christ child."

In 2019 a baby Jesus figurine was stolen twice in one month from a church in St. John's, Newfoundland.

=== Sweden ===
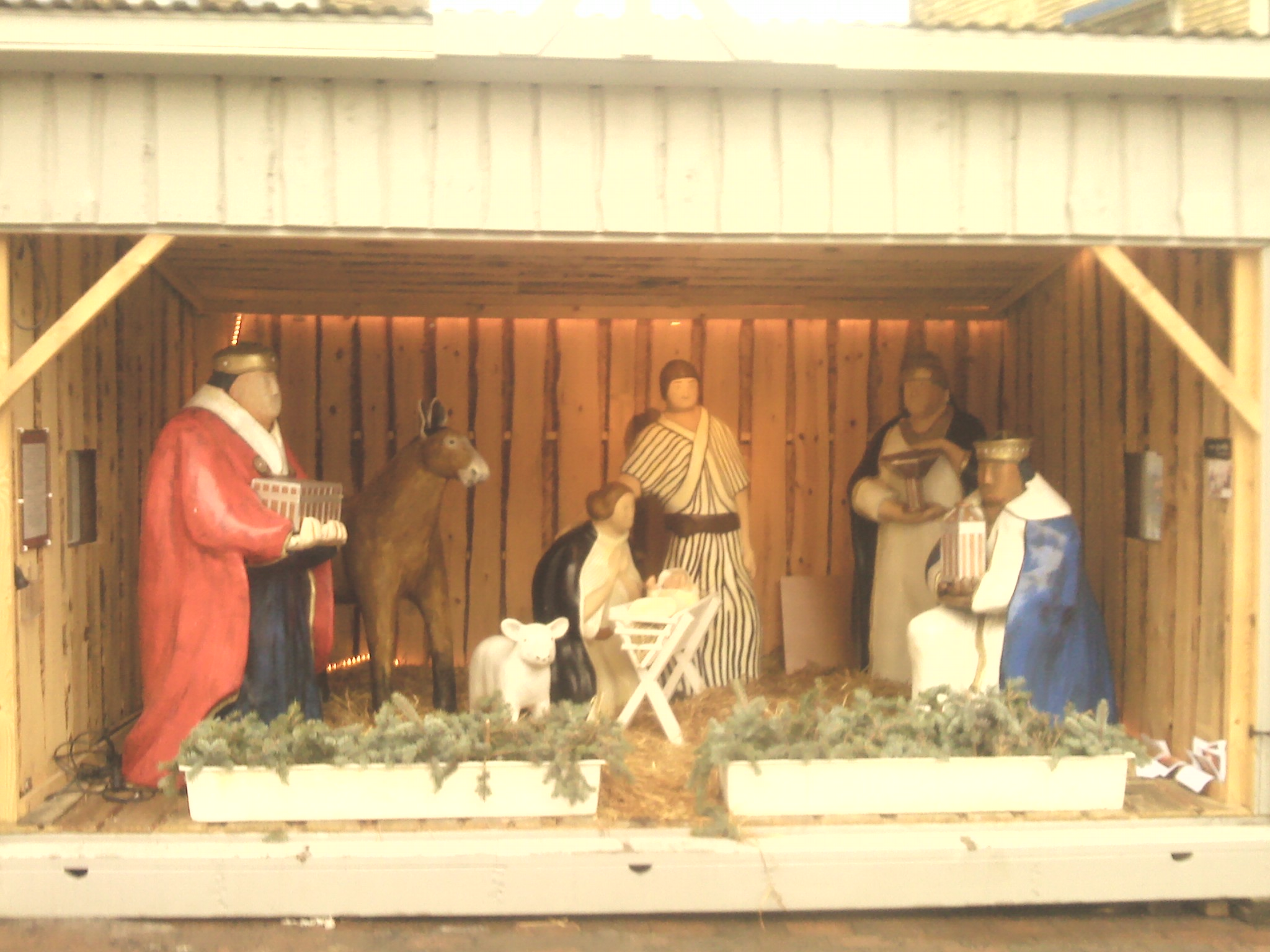
The Baby Jesus statue has often been stolen from this outdoor nativity scene in Jönköping, Sweden.

During some Christmases of the first decade of the 21st century, a baby Jesus statue was often stolen from the outdoor nativity scene in Jönköping in Sweden, once thrown into the nearby lake of Vättern. This has led to the nativity scene, resembling a wooden stable, being closed by nights.

=== United Kingdom ===
Nativity scene thefts, generally including the theft of the baby Jesus, have been reported across the United Kingdom. In Wales, a baby Jesus was stolen two years in a row from a city center nativity scene in Cardiff.

In the village of Abernethy, Perth and Kinross, the baby Jesus is replaced by a Shrek doll as part of an annual tradition originating in 2020.

On 22 December 2021, the baby Jesus from the nativity scene in Preston, Lancashire was stolen as the display was vandalised and found without a baby Jesus the next morning. In hopes of the baby Jesus returning, local councillors published a tweet asking for the baby Jesus to be returned anonymously to the Town Hall before Christmas Day. The baby Jesus was found by local restaurant owners and returned in time for Christmas Day.

=== United States ===
Many communities across America have experienced thefts of baby Jesus figurines, and, in some instances, entire nativity scenes. Periodically, it is reported that these are part of a regional or national trend, but as these thefts are inconsistently tracked, this may simply reflect trends in how they are reported.

In 2008 a baby Jesus was stolen from First United Methodist Church in Kittanning, Pennsylvania, and replaced with a pumpkin. In Eureka Springs, Arkansas, a thief stole the baby Jesus statue from a public display, along with the concrete block and chain that was supposed to act as a deterrent. Some communities experience repeat baby Jesus thefts. A baby Jesus was stolen in December 2008 from a Stony Point, New York, town display. The nativity had been vandalized the year before, and a menorah next to it had been toppled and broken.

Some figurines have been defaced with profanity or Satanic symbols. In December 2008, for example, a fiberglass baby Jesus valued at US$375 was stolen from a Eureka Springs, Arkansas, park and later recovered, but it had been defaced by racial slurs, a swastika, and a Hitler mustache. The eyes were also blacked out and pieces had been broken off.

In 2009 a wave of such thefts across the United States was reported in The Guardian. Two men in Kentucky were sentenced to 45 days in jail for ripping a baby Jesus out of a scene installed at the side of a private house. In December 2015, as many as five baby Jesus statues were stolen from the lawns of churches in North Jersey.

In his autobiography, The Long Hard Road Out of Hell, the American singer Marilyn Manson admitted playing a prank in which he and a few friends stole figurines of Jesus then replaced them with hams. They sent a communique to a newspaper posing as a black radical group saying that it was a protest against "the plasticisation of the black man's wisdom with the so-called 'white Christmas'."

== Security measures ==
Some nativity display owners have taken measures to secure their property against would-be thieves. Others are reluctant to exercise such vigilance. One man in the state of Indiana who suffered the loss of his baby Jesus figurine rebuffed suggestions to secure the figurines on his porch because "that would be like putting Jesus in jail". Traditional security measures are not always foolproof. The baby Jesus fastened to the national Christmas creche at Independence Hall disappeared within days.

Some communities, churches, and citizens are employing electronic technology to protect their property. A Texas family, for example, positioned surveillance cameras in their yard and discovered a teenage girl stealing their baby Jesus figurine, valued at nearly US$500. In 2008, a security device distributor offered its surveillance cameras and GPS devices to 200 nonprofit religious institutions for a month's use gratis. In one case, after a life-sized ceramic nativity figurine disappeared from the lawn of a community center in Wellington, Florida, sheriff's deputies tracked it to an apartment where it was found lying face-down on a carpet. An 18-year-old woman was arrested.

Another method that has been attempted is nailing down baby Jesus statues, but this may be considered sacrilegious by many of the Christian faith.

Some displays simply leave the baby out of their nativity scenes, adding it on request or during specific times.

== Perspectives ==
While baby Jesus thefts are largely regarded as pranks, they are set apart by the involvement of a religious icon. "They think it's a prank, but it isn't a prank to some of these people," Pennsylvania state police corporal Paul Romanic told The Morning Call newspaper, in regards to an incident in which ten nativity scene figures were found in a yard after being stolen from across Bucks County, Pennsylvania. "Plus, it's just wrong to steal the baby Jesus."

Some have wondered if an anti-Christian sentiment lurks behind the thefts. Attorney Mike Johnson of the Alliance Defending Freedom (formerly the Alliance Defense Fund), a Christian legal group, stated, "I suspect most of it is childish pranks. Clearly, there are adults with an agenda to remove Christ from Christmas. But they tend to occupy themselves with the courts and courtroom of public opinion." Stephen Nissenbaum, the author of The Battle for Christmas, views baby Jesus theft as neither innocent vandalism nor religious hate crimes. Nissenbaum writes that, "What it means is that it's OK to go around violating even pretty important norms, as long as real human harm isn't being done. It's not exactly devaluing Christianity, but it is sort of a ritualized challenge to it. It could be Christian kids doing it—and on January 2 they become good Christians again."

Historian Daniel Silliman has argued that, whatever the thieves' intention, the act puts the culture of Christmas in a different light. "Baby Jesus thieves literally take the Christ out of Christmas," Silliman writes. "When they do, it becomes apparent that the sacred object is also a piece of property, protected by the law that protects property and this whole apparatus that defends Christmas: fences and lights, tracking devices and private security companies, patrolling police and the courts. The commercialization of Christmas is visible here in a way it might not be, otherwise. That's the power of the joke."

== In media ==
- In "The Big Little Jesus," the 24 December 1953, episode of the television series Dragnet, sergeants Friday and Smith are called upon to investigate the theft of a baby Jesus statue from a church nativity display on Christmas Eve. Unable to solve the crime, the officers tell the priest that mass must be celebrated without the baby Jesus. The figurine is restored when a boy arrives with it in a wagon. He tells the officers that he had vowed that if he got a wagon for Christmas, baby Jesus would have the first ride. This episode was remade when Dragnet went to color in 1967, and retitled "The Christmas Story."
- In The Leftovers season one episode 'B.J and the A.C', the baby Jesus from Mapleton's nativity display goes missing. The town's mayor Lucy Warburton announces that Kevin will find the baby Jesus, while she secretly tasks Kevin with simply buying a new one and roughing it up to appear lost.
- In Better Call Saul, Jesse Pinkman recognizes Kim Wexler as a public defender who helped Combo get off after he was arrested as a juvenile for stealing a baby Jesus from a nativity scene. Jesse is not sure why Combo did it and Kim tells him to tell Combo that she hopes that he keeps his nose clean.
- In Angela's Christmas, a young girl sees the baby in a church's nativity scene doesn't have a blanket, so she returns later to steal it and take it home to keep him warm.
- In "Stealing Baby Jesus" (a book and a stage production), author Bernadette Nason recounts efforts to make Christmas perfect, including stealing someone else's baby to replace the one missing from her family's nativity scene.

== See also ==
- Garden gnome liberationists
- Gävle goat
