= Robert T. Westbrook =

American writer (born 1945)

Robert T. Westbrook (born December 24, 1945, New York City) is an American writer. He is the son of columnist Sheilah Graham.

== Biography ==
Westbrook was raised in Los Angeles until his adolescent years, when his family moved to New York City. Robert attended the Putney School and Columbia College.

After traveling to the Soviet Union, Westbrook wrote his first book at age 17, Journey Behind the Iron Curtain, which was published in 1963 by G.P. Putnam's Sons. In the 1960s, when he was at Columbia University, he wrote his first novel, The Magic Garden of Stanley Sweetheart, published by Crown in 1970. The novel became an MGM film, with actor Don Johnson in the title role.

In the 1980s, while living with his family in Hawaii, Westbrook began a handful of satirical mysteries set in 1950s Los Angeles.

In 1988, Westbrook was living in Greece when his mother, Sheilah Graham, died on November 17 in Palm Beach, Florida, of congestive heart failure. She left him her papers and record and instructed Westbrook to tell her story, which he did, describing his mother's romance with F. Scott Fitzgerald, and other details that were omitted from Graham's 1958 memoir, Beloved Infidel. Published by HarperCollins in 1995, the American magazine Kirkus Reviews considered Intimate Lies a valuable contribution to the literature on Fitzgerald and Graham.

== Books ==
=== The Torch Singer Trilogy ===
- Book One: An Overnight Sensation, Swan's Nest Canada hardcover, paperback, eBook (2014)
- Book Two: An Almost Perfect Ending, Swan's Nest Canada hardcover, paperback, eBook (2014)

=== Non-fiction ===
- Intimate Lies HarperCollins (1995), republished, Speaking Volumes, paperback, eBook (2018)

=== Early works ===
- Journey Behind the Iron Curtain, G.P. Putnam's Sons (1963)
- The Magic Garden of Stanley Sweetheart, Crown (1970)

=== Left Handed Police Man Mysteries ===
- The Left Handed Police Man, Crown (1986) Warner Books paperback (1987), republished, Speaking Volumes, paperback, eBook (2018)
- Nostalgia Kills Crown (1988), republished, Speaking Volumes, paperback, eBook (2018)
- Lady Left Crown (1990), republished, Speaking Volumes, paperback, eBook (2018)
- Rich Kids Birchlane (1992)

=== Howard Moon Deer Mysteries ===
- Ghost Dancer Signet (1998), republished, Speaking Volumes, paperback, eBook (2017)
- Warrior Circle Signet (1999), republished, Speaking Volumes, paperback, eBook (2017)
- Red Moon Signet (2000), republished, Speaking Volumes, paperback, eBook (2017)
- Ancient Enemy Signet (2001), republished, Speaking Volumes (2018)

"Turquoise Lady" Speaking Volumes, paperback, eBook (2019)

"Blue Moon," Speaking Volumes, paperback, eBook (2020)

=== Novels based on screenplays ===
- The Mexican Signet (2001), from the film starring Julia Roberts and Brad Pitt
- Insomnia Signet (2002), from the mystery thriller starring Al Pacino and Robin Williams
- The Final Cut (2004), adapted from the sci-fi thriller with Robin Williams and Mira Sorvino
- The Saudi Connection (2006) Jack Anderson and Robert Westbrook Tor/Forge
