= Leonard Horn =

American film director

- Born: August 1, 1926; Bangor, Maine, U.S.
- Died: May 25, 1975 (aged 48); Los Angeles, California, U.S.
- Occupation: Director

Leonard Horn (August 1, 1926 – May 25, 1975) was an American director of prime time television programs in the 1960s and 1970s and helped shape a number of "classic" adventure and sci-fi series, including Mission: Impossible, Mannix, Voyage to the Bottom of the Sea, and Wonder Woman. Horn was born in Bangor, Maine.

== Career ==
Horn started directing in 1959-1962 for Alfred Hitchcock Presents and The Alfred Hitchcock Hour and was soon among a stable of directors working on such popular prime-time programs as The Untouchables, Route 66, and The Fugitive. Horn's most sustained contribution to one series was directing ten episodes of Mission: Impossible, including five in the first season. His "Operation Rogosh" (1966), the series' 3rd episode, ties among IMDB voters for the most popular first-season show, and most of his other efforts get high marks. In one of Horn's second-season episodes, "Trek", Peter Graves appeared for the first time as "Mr. Phelps".

Contemporary fan-sites, such as the viewer polling pages of the Internet Movie Database (IMDB) and TV.com, show Horn's work to have stood the test of time. Many of the 94 episodes he directed for 34 prime-time television series rank among the more popular moments in the first "Golden Age of Television."

== TV pilot episodes ==
Horn directed several pilots, including the first episode of Mannix ("My Name is Mannix"), written by Bruce Geller, the creator and producer of Mission: Impossible, in 1967. Half of the images for the show's subsequently-famous opening montage derive from this production. Horn directed an additional seven episodes for the long-running series. He also directed the pilot for the short-lived, 1974 series Nakia starring Robert Forster. His last pilot, and final television production, was for the series Wonder Woman in 1975, and was nominated for an Emmy in graphic design and title sequencing.

== Sci-fi shows ==
Along with adventure, science-fiction was among Horn's most successful genres. Of three first-season episodes he directed for The Outer Limits, two are ranked in the top ten by IMDB users, and one, "The Man Who Was Never Born" is considered among the series' classics. Horn's single Lost in Space entry ("Invaders from the 5th Dimension") likewise makes the IMDB top ten of the series' first-season episodes. In the premier season of Voyage to the Bottom of the Sea, the four most popular episodes among IMDB users were all directed by Horn, with "The Fear-Makers" called by one user "the first truly great episode".

== Other genres ==
Even when Horn turned his attention to less familiar genres, such as the Western, he often managed to get the best performances out of his actors. The one episode he directed for The High Chaparral ("The Price of Revenge") ties among IMDB fans for the best first-season entry, and is among the most popular in the whole series. Late in his career, Horn turned to police shows, directing nine episodes of The Rookies, three for Police Woman, one each for McMillan & Wife and The Mod Squad. He directed the 1973 TV movie Hunter. He also directed for the short-lived 1974 ABC police drama Nakia.

== Producer ==
Horn briefly tried his hand at producing as well as directing in the series It Takes a Thief. His one other effort as a producer (this time without directing) was the made-for-TV movie The Lindbergh Kidnapping Case (1976) – which garnered an Emmy for lead Anthony Hopkins, and a Golden Globe nomination for Best TV Movie. One earlier directorial effort, the TV movie Rogue's Gallery (1968), also landed a Golden Globe nomination for lead Greta Baldwin.

== Feature films ==
Horn directed The Magic Garden of Stanley Sweetheart (1970) which Andy Warhol called "the quintessential, most truthful studio-made film about the '60s counterculture". Horn also directed Corky (1972) starring Robert Blake as a stock car racer.

== Death ==
Horn suffered a heart attack while shooting the pilot for Wonder Woman in the spring of 1975 and died that May at the age of 48 in Los Angeles, California.
