= Gingerbread man =

Cookie made from gingerbread in the shape of a human

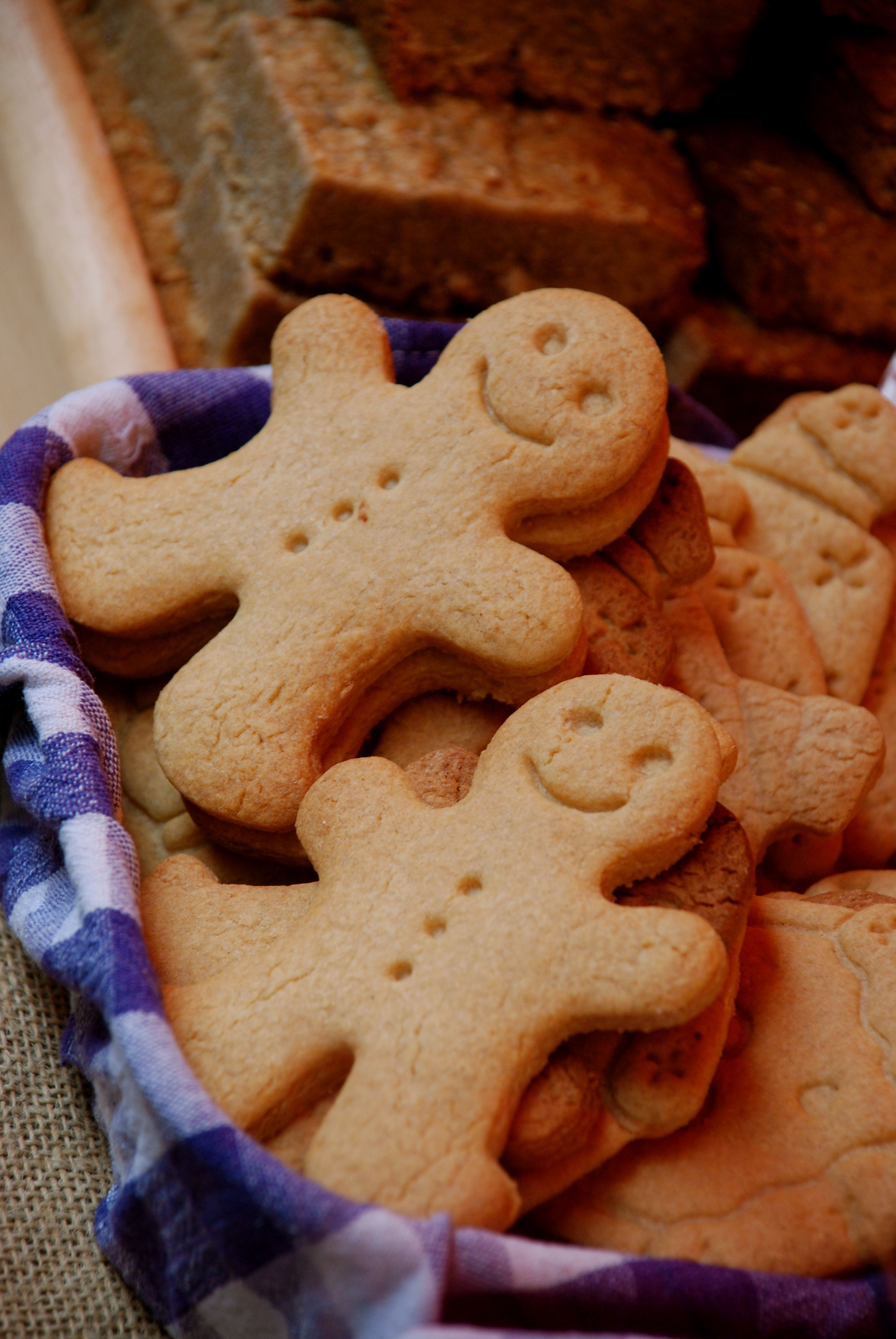
- Type: Cookie
- Place of origin: England
- Main ingredients: Gingerbread

A gingerbread man is a biscuit or cookie made from gingerbread, usually in the shape of a stylized human being. However, other shapes, especially seasonal themes (Christmas, Halloween, Easter, etc.), and characters are also common.

== History ==
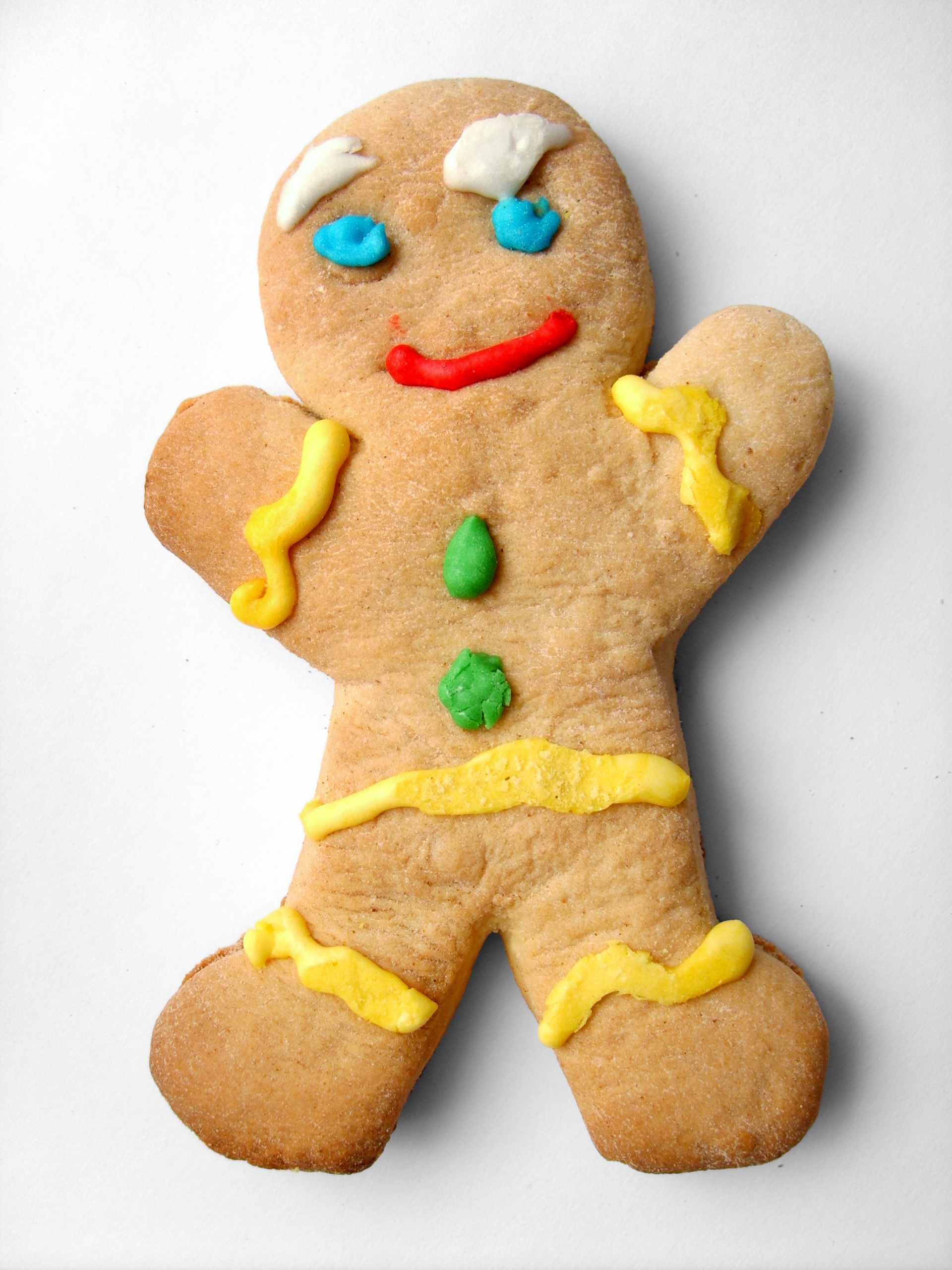
A gingerbread man, with icing decoration

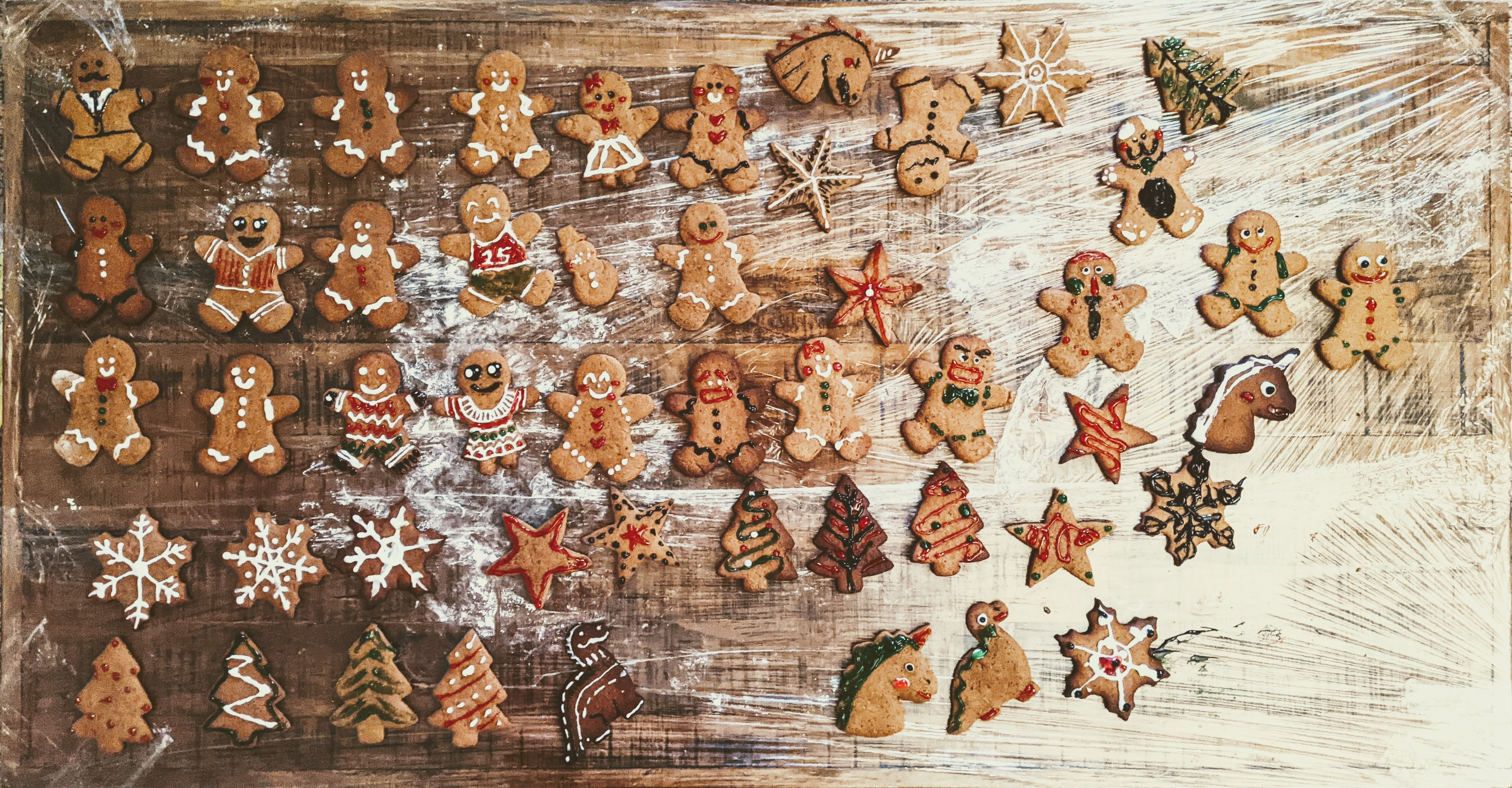
Freshly baked gingerbread people with a variety of decorations

Gingerbread dates from the 15th century and figurative biscuit-making was practised in the 16th century. The first documented instance of figure-shaped gingerbread biscuits was at the court of Elizabeth I of England. She had the gingerbread figures made and presented in the likeness of some of her important guests, who brought the human shape of the gingerbread cookies.

Gingerbread was long associated with fairs and festivals, and by the 19th century was connected to Christmas. In the British Victorian royal household, gingerbread was given to the children and the dog. A type of gingerbread called Pepper Cake was popular at Christmas in West Riding, Yorkshire.

== Characteristics ==
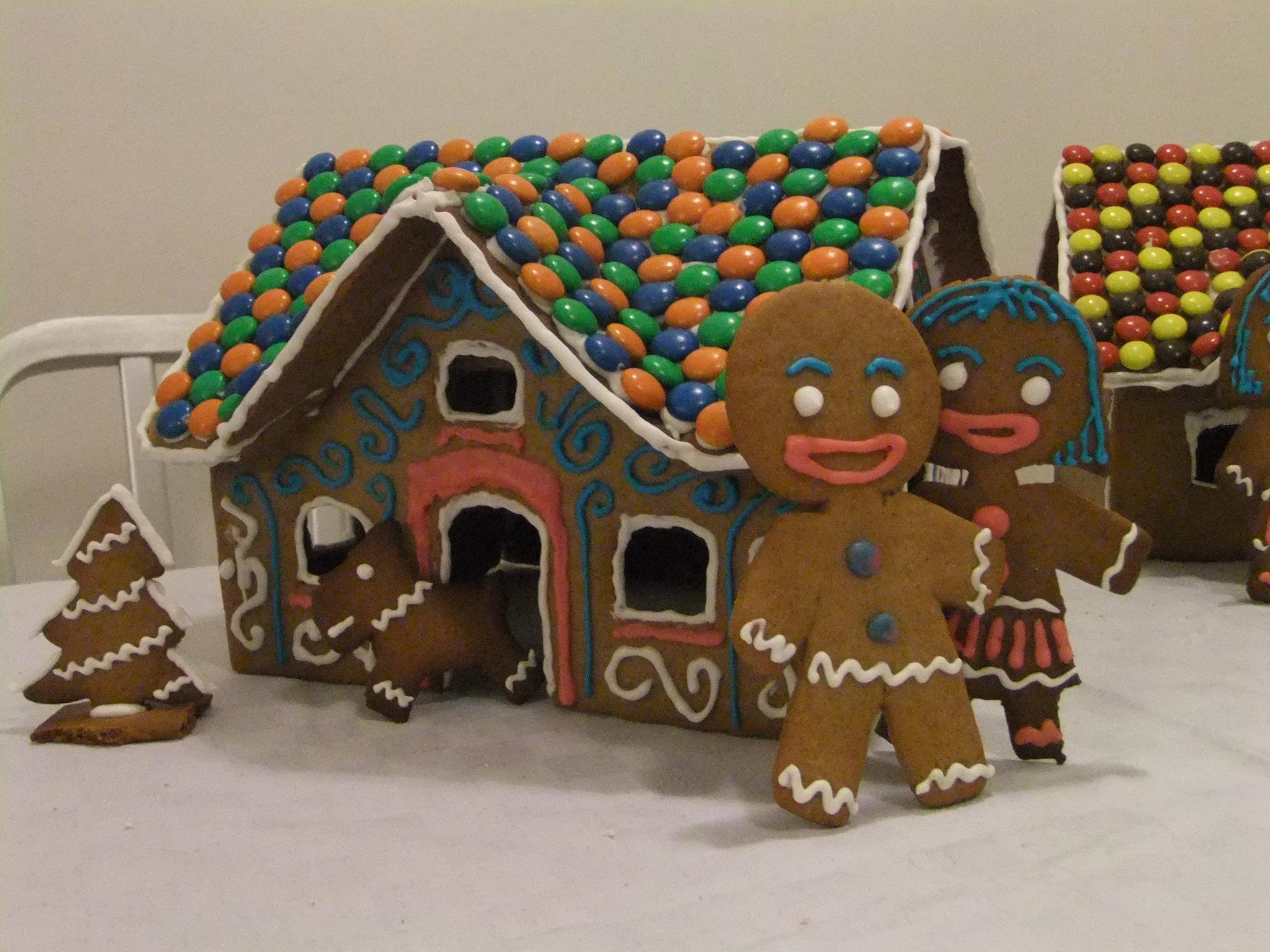
Gingerbread man (styled after the Gingerbread Man from Shrek) with his wife and dog in front of a gingerbread house

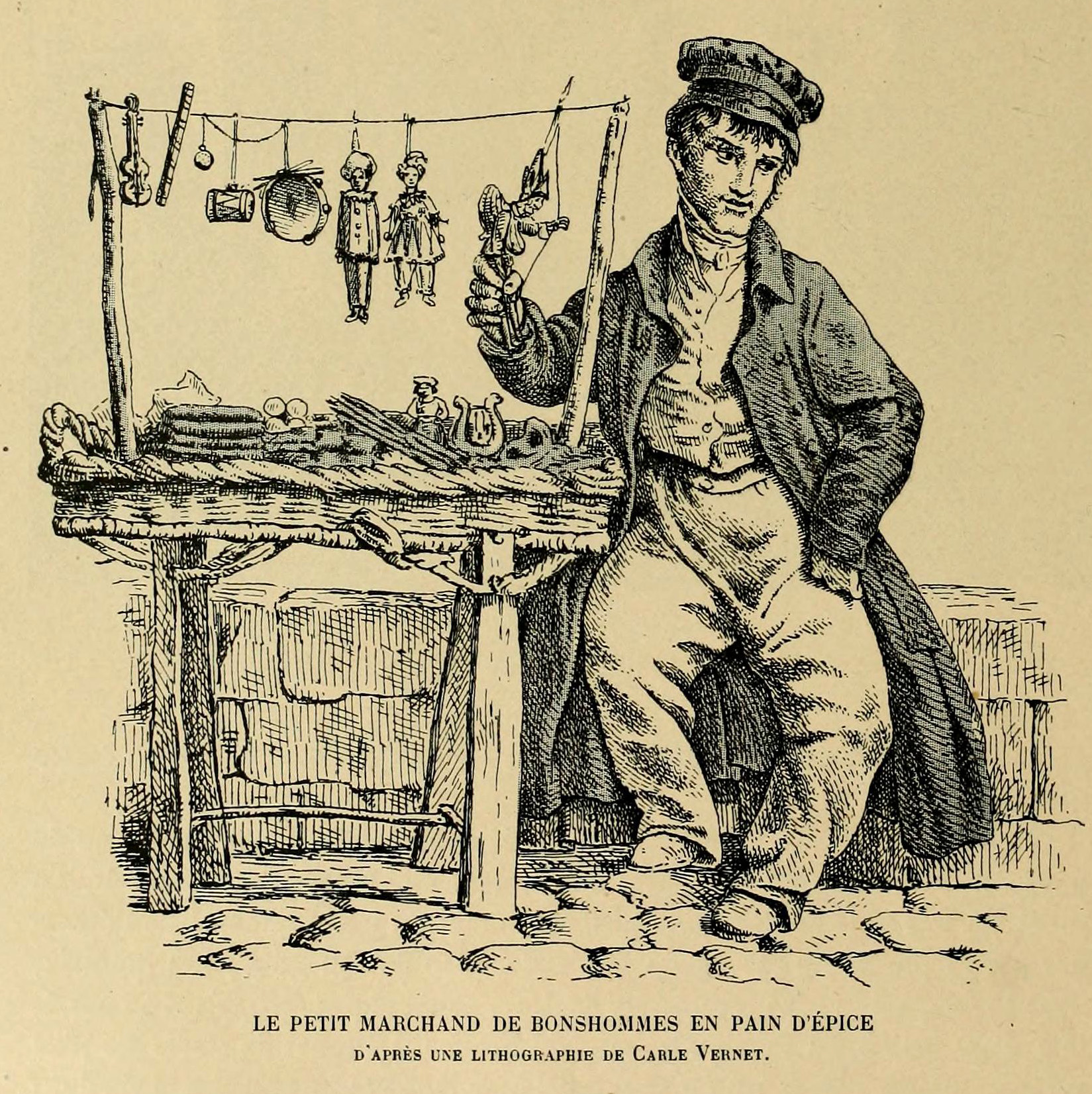
Gingerbread salesman (1902)

Most gingerbread men share a roughly humanoid shape, with stubby feet and no fingers. Many gingerbread people have a face, though whether the features are indentations within the face itself or other candies stuck on with icing or chocolate varies from recipe to recipe. Other decorations are common; hair, shirt cuffs, and shoes are sometimes applied, but by far the most popular decoration is shirt buttons, which are traditionally represented by gum drops, icing, or raisins.

== In world records ==
According to the Guinness Book of Records, the world's largest gingerbread man was made by the staff of the IKEA Furuset store in Oslo, Norway, on 9 November 2009. The gingerbread man weighed 1435.2 pounds (651 kg).

== In fiction and popular culture ==
- "The Gingerbread Man" is a fairy tale about a gingerbread man who comes to life, outruns an elderly couple and various animals, and is devoured by a fox in the end.
  - Gingy is a talking gingerbread man character in the Shrek series of animated movies. He is derived from the fairy tale character.
  - The Jasper Fforde comic detective novel The Fourth Bear features a more-than-human-sized gingerbread man who is a psychopathic serial killer who likes to pull off his victims' limbs. The difficulties in catching him are a reference to the fairy tale.
- In Pyotr Ilyich Tchaikovsky's ballet The Nutcracker (1892), the eponymous hero leads an army of gingerbread men against the Mouse King and his fellows.
- The Gingerbread People are the main characters in the game Candy Land (1945).
- The Gingerbread Men were featured in The Muppet Show. In the "Don Knotts" episode, the Gingerbread Men sing the song "Sweet Gingerbread Man" as the opening number. The lead Gingerbread Man is a hand-rod Muppet performed by Frank Oz while the full-bodied Gingerbread Men were performed by Jim Henson, Dave Goelz, Richard Hunt, and
- In the film The Brothers Grimm, a nightmarish twist on the Gingerbread Man appears. A young child is splashed with mud, which steals the child's eyes, nose, and mouth. It then forms a small mud body with the child's stolen features for a face. The creature grabs the child and absorbs her into itself. It runs off yelling, "You can't catch me; I'm the Gingerbread Man!"
- The first game in the Cookie Run series, Ovenbreak, is a runner game that puts players in the role of GingerBrave, a gingerbread man running to escape from the Witch's Oven. Subsequent games would introduce numerous other "Cookies," iterations of gingerbread men based on different combinations of ingredients and character archetypes.
